= Saxon-Lower Lusatian Heathland =

Coordinates: 51.4333°N 14.2500°E

- Native name: Sächsisch-Niederlausitzer Heideland
- Classification: Natural regions of the Free State of Saxony
- Natural region: Saxon-Lower Lusatian Heathland
- State(s): Saxony
- Country: Germany

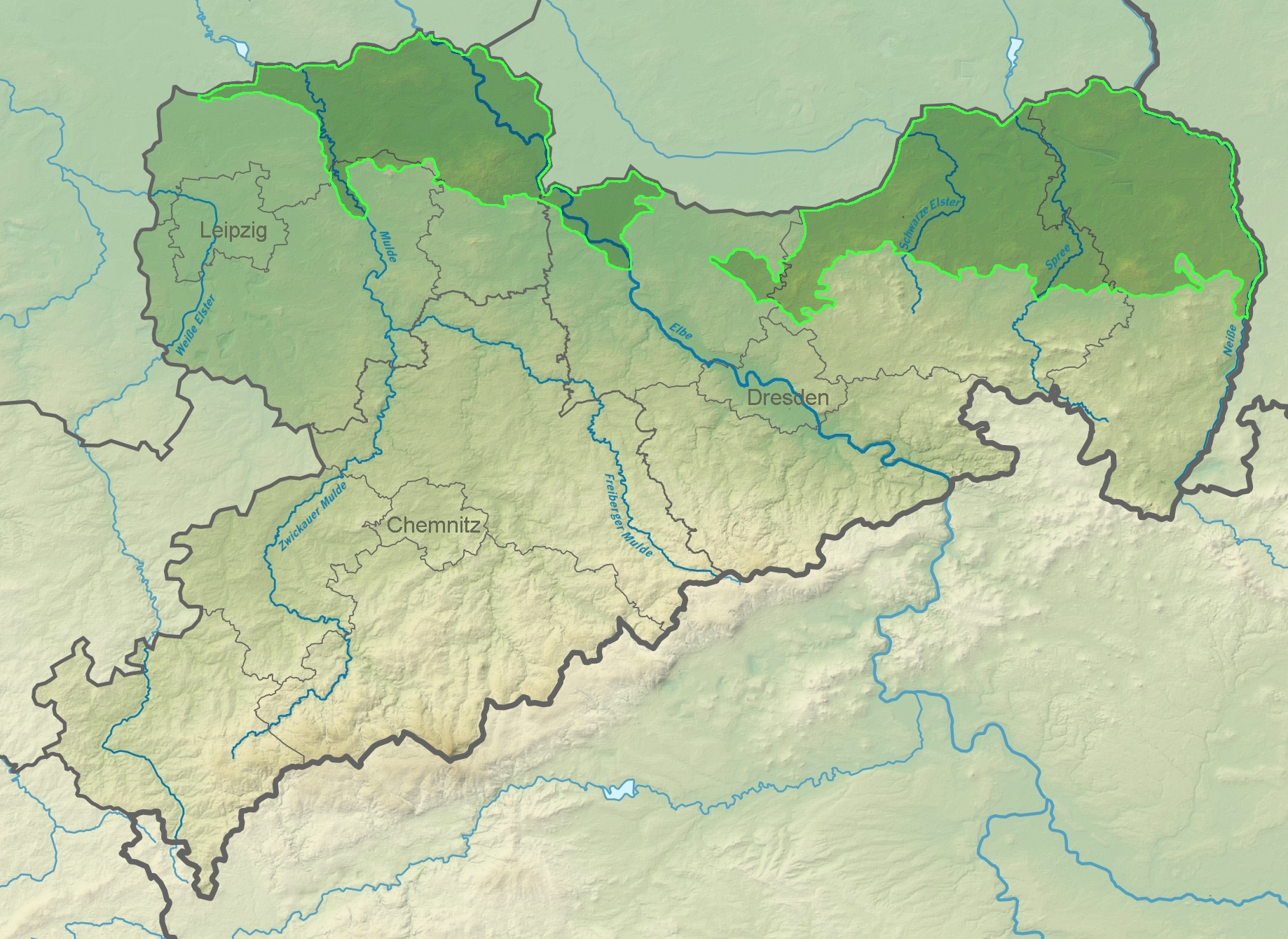
The Saxon-Lower Lusatian Heathland within Saxony

The Saxon-Lower Lusatian Heathland (German: Sächsisch-Niederlausitzer Heideland) is a natural region in the German state of Saxony. The current natural region division of the Free State of Saxony groups landscape units of the upper geochore or sub-regional level (so-called "macro-geochores") into three "Saxon natural regions" to produce a large-scale classification. These are part of higher order (cross-border) natural regions, whereas the landscape units previously used described areas that were largely confined within the borders of Saxony.

The Saxon-Lower Lusatian Heathland forms the southernmost extent of the North German Plain in eastern Germany. It comprises two separate regions on the northern edge of Saxony and covers about 20% of the state's area. Whilst its boundaries in the north and east are based on political boundaries, due to the limitations of the research and data collation that underpinned the classification, its remaining boundaries are based on physical geographic considerations and are identical with their subordinate natural regions. The western part of the Heathland, roughly between the rivers Mulde and Große Röder, comprises the macro-geochores of the Düben-Dahlen Heath, the Elbe-Elster Lowland and, in the extreme northwest, a small part of the Bitterfeld Mining District, the bulk of which lies in the Saxony-Anhalt and is referred to as the Bitterfeld Mining Region (Tagebauregion Bitterfeld) in the regional landscape planning of that state. The eastern part of the Heathland covers the Königsbrück-Ruhland Heaths, the Upper Lusatian Heath and Pond Landscape, the Upper Lusatian Mining District, the Muskau Heath, the Lusatian Border Wall and, in the extreme north, a small element of the Cottbus Sand Plateau, which lies mainly within the state of Brandenburg. Between the two halves of this natural region is the Großenhainer Pflege, which is counted as part of the Saxon Loess Fields due to its natural regional characteristics.

Characteristic and unifying features of the natural regions grouped within the Saxon-Lower Lusatian Heathland are soils that are poor in nutrients lying on thick, unconsolidated, Ice Age sediments, with an abundance of groundwater and underground deposits of brown coal. This is a so-called Old Drift landscape, in which erosion and soil-forming processes have been around for a very long time. The surface landforms that arose in the Pleistocene epoch are therefore heavily eroded or even levelled, the soils are heavily decalcified and, in places, strongly acidified. The low agricultural utility across wide areas resulted in a relatively sparse population and, especially in the 20th century, it was extensively used for military training purposes. Large areas also became an industrial landscape as a result of open-cast, lignite mining.

Relatively un-fragmented areas, numerous water bodies and wetland sites and extensive nutrient-poor open land, amongst other features, have led to a high conservation value being placed on the region, which contains about 71% of Saxony's nature reserves.

== Sources ==
- Mannsfeld, K.; Bastian, O.; Kaminski, A.; Katzschner, W.; Röder, M.; Syrbe, R.-U.; Winkler, B. (2005): Landschaftsgliederungen in Sachsen. Mitteilungen des Landesvereins Sächsischer Heimatschutz e.V., special publication, no ISBN.
- Mannsfeld, K. und Syrbe, R.-U. (ed.): Naturräume in Sachsen mit Kartenbeilage „Naturräumliche Gliederung Sachsens“, in: Forschungen zur deutschen Landeskunde (Band 257), Deutsche Akademie für Landeskunde, Selbstverlag, Leipzig, 2008, ISBN 978-3-88143-078-4
- Landschaftsforschungszentrum e.V. Dresden: Recherchesystem der Naturräume und Naturraumpotentiale des Freistaates Sachsen (map view of the natural regions: in the index "Sachthemen" open the window "Naturräume" and activate the tick box "Naturregionen")
- Sächsisches Staatsministerium für Umwelt und Landwirtschaft (ed.): Naturschutzgebiete in Sachsen. Zentraler Broschürenversand der Sächsischen Staatsregierung, Dresden, 2008, ISBN 3-932627-17-2
