= Natural regions of Saxony =

The classification of natural regions of Saxony shown here was produced between 1994 and 2001 by a working group called "Ecosystem and Regional Character" (Naturhaushalt und Gebietscharakter) at the Saxonian Academy of Sciences in Leipzig as part of the research and development project "Natural Regions and Natural Region Potential of the Free State of Saxony" (Naturräume und Naturraumpotentiale des Freistaates) at a scale of 1:50,000 as the basis for the rural development and regional planning. This was also supported by the Saxon State Ministry of the Environment and Agriculture and the Saxon Ministry of the Interior.

The basis of the structure was a comprehensive, statewide compilation of the smallest physical geographic landscape units (physiotopes). These were aggregated into larger units (nano-geochores and micro-geochores) in an orderly way using the method of "natural region categories". For each of the micro-geochores that resulted from this, a 9-page document was produced. This was followed by mapping the regions in a series of 55 map sheets to a scale of 1:50,000 (the "Natural region map of Saxony") . In further stages, approximately 1,445 micro-geochores were aggregated into meso-geochores and these were eventually combined into 28 macro-geochores (see the list of natural regions in Saxony) . At the level of micro-geochore upwards, each natural area was given an individual designation, with any newly created names following certain conventions. The classification of macro-geochores into natural regions of a higher level was achieved using the so-called "Saxon natural regions", although they were also given their own proper names, but which largely followed political boundaries and practical subdivisions of more extensive landscape units.

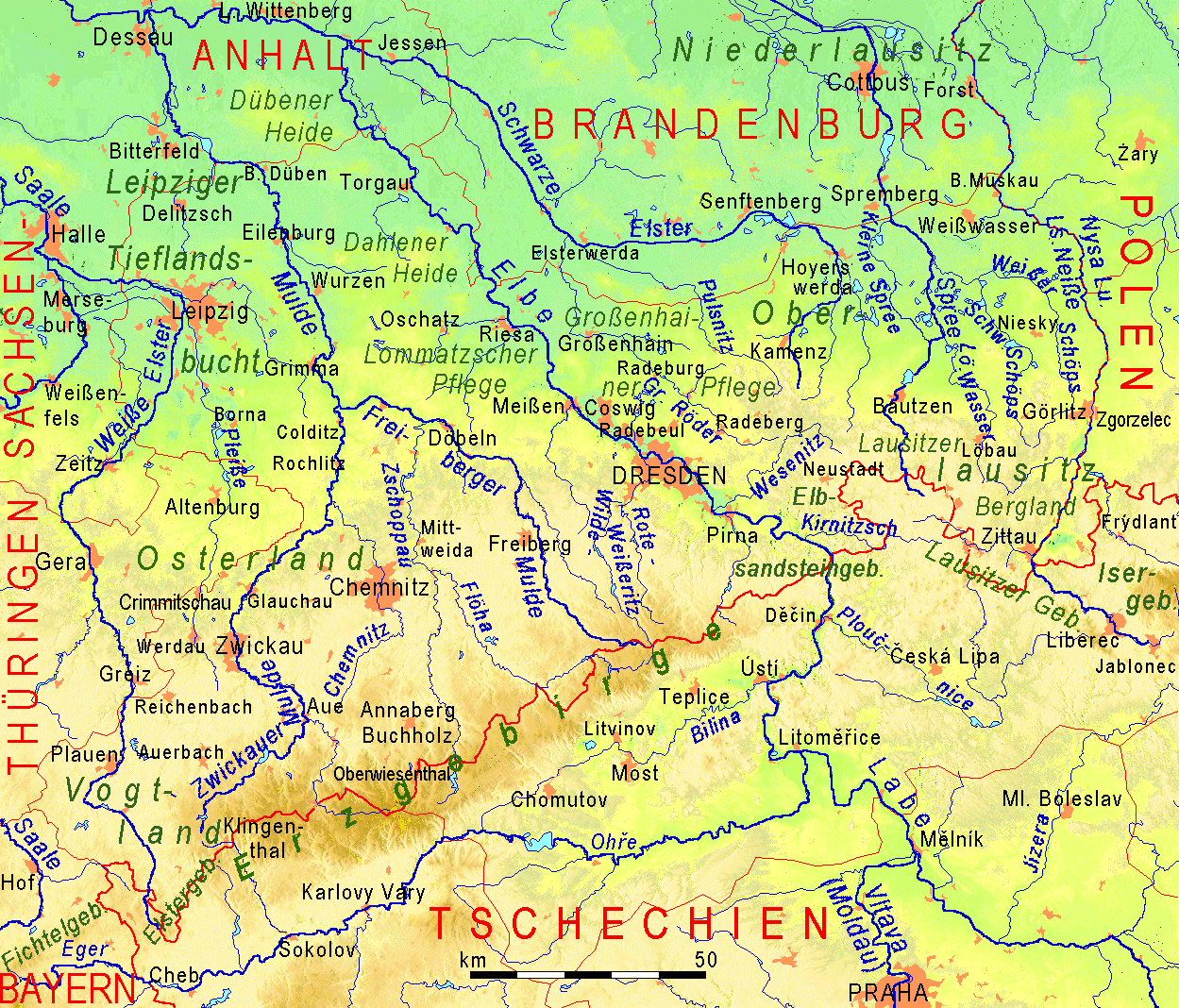
The topography of Saxony

== Saxony's natural regions and macro-geochores ==
- Saxon-Lower Lusatian Heathland (Sächsisch-Niederlausitzer Heideland) - part of the North German Plain
  - Lusatian Border Ridge (Lausitzer Grenzwall)
  - Muskau Heath (Muskauer Heide)
  - Upper Lusatian Heath and Pond Landscape (Oberlausitzer Heide- und Teichgebiet)
  - Königsbrück-Ruhland Heaths (Königsbrück-Ruhlander Heiden)
  - Elbe-Elster Lowland (Elbe-Elster-Niederung)
  - Düben-Dahlen Heath (Düben-Dahlener Heide)
  - Upper Lusatian Mining District (Oberlausitzer Bergbaurevier)
- Saxon Loess Fields (Sächsisches Lössgefilde) - part of the central European loess belt
  - Leipzig Land (Leipziger Land)
  - Leipzig South Mining Region (Bergbaurevier Südraum Leipzig)
  - North Saxon Plateaux and Hill Country (Nordsächsisches Platten- und Hügelland)
  - Großenhainer Pflege
  - East Thuringian Loess Hill Country (Ostthüringisches Lösshügelland)
  - Ore Mountain Basin (Erzgebirgsbecken)
  - Central Saxon Loess Hill Country (Mittelsächsisches Lösshügelland)
  - Mulde Loess Hill Country (Mulde-Lösshügelland)
  - Dresden Basin (Dresdner Elbtalweitung)
  - Eastern Ore Mountain Foreland (Östliches Erzgebirgsvorland)
  - West Lusatian Hill Country and Uplands (Westlausitzer Hügel- und Bergland)
  - Upper Lusatian Gefilde (Oberlausitzer Gefilde)
  - Eastern Upper Lusatia (Östliche Oberlausitz)
- Saxon Highlands and Uplands (Sächsisches Bergland und Mittelgebirge) - part of the Central Uplands
  - Western Ore Mountains (Westerzgebirge)
  - Central Ore Mountains (Mittleres Erzgebirge)
  - Eastern Ore Mountains (Osterzgebirge)
  - Vogtland
  - Elster Mountains (Elstergebirge)
  - Saxon Switzerland (Sächsische Schweiz)
  - Upper Lusatian Highlands (Oberlausitzer Bergland)
  - Zittau Mountains (Zittauer Gebirge)

== See also ==
- Natural regions of Germany

== Sources ==
- Mannsfeld, K.; Bastian, O.; Kaminski, A.; Katzschner, W.; Röder, M.; Syrbe, R.-U.; Winkler, B. (2005): Landschaftsgliederungen in Sachsen. Mitteilungen des Landesvereins Sächsischer Heimatschutz e.V., special edition, no ISBN.
- Mannsfeld, K. und Syrbe, R.-U. (ed.): Naturräume in Sachsen mit Kartenbeilage „Naturräumliche Gliederung Sachsens“, in: Forschungen zur deutschen Landeskunde (Vol. 257), Deutsche Akademie für Landeskunde, Selbstverlag, Leipzig, 2008, ISBN 978-3-88143-078-4
- Mannsfeld, K.; Bastian, O.; Bieler, J.; Gerber, S.; König, A.; Lütz, M.; Schulze, S.; Syrbe, R.-U.: Abschlussbericht Arbeitsstelle "Naturhaushalt und Gebietscharakter" 1965-2007
- Classification of Germany by Meynen and the BfN, www.geographie.giersbeck.de, retrieved on 8 June 2011

== Literature ==
- Haase, G.; Mannsfeld, K. (Hrsg.)(2003): Naturraumeinheiten, Landschaftsfunktionen und Leitbilder am Beispiel von Sachsen. Forschungen zur Deutschen Landeskunde, Vol. 250 (with CD ROM), ISBN 3-88143-071-7
