= Lusatian =

Lusatian may refer to:

- someone or something pertaining to Lusatia, a historical region divided between modern Germany and Poland
- Lusatian Neisse, a border river between modern Germany and Poland
- Lusatian Lake District, the lake region in Lusatia
- Lusatian Highlands, a hilly region between Germany and Czechia
- Lusatian Mountains, a mountain range of the Western Sudetes
- Lusatian Border Ridge, a protected natural region in Germany
- Lusatian Sorbs, a regional designation for the Sorbian people
- Lusatian languages, a regional designation for Sorbian languages
- Lusatian dialects, a group of dialects of German language
- Lusatian culture, an archaeological culture of the later Bronze Age and early Iron Age
- Lusatian March, a historical province in medieval Lusatia
- Lusatian League, a historical alliance of six towns in the 14th century Lusatia
- Lusatian Alliance, a political party in Germany

== See also ==
- Lusatian Serbian (disambiguation)
- Serbo-Lusatian (disambiguation)
