= Leipzig Bay =

Coordinates: 51.0000°N 13.0000°E

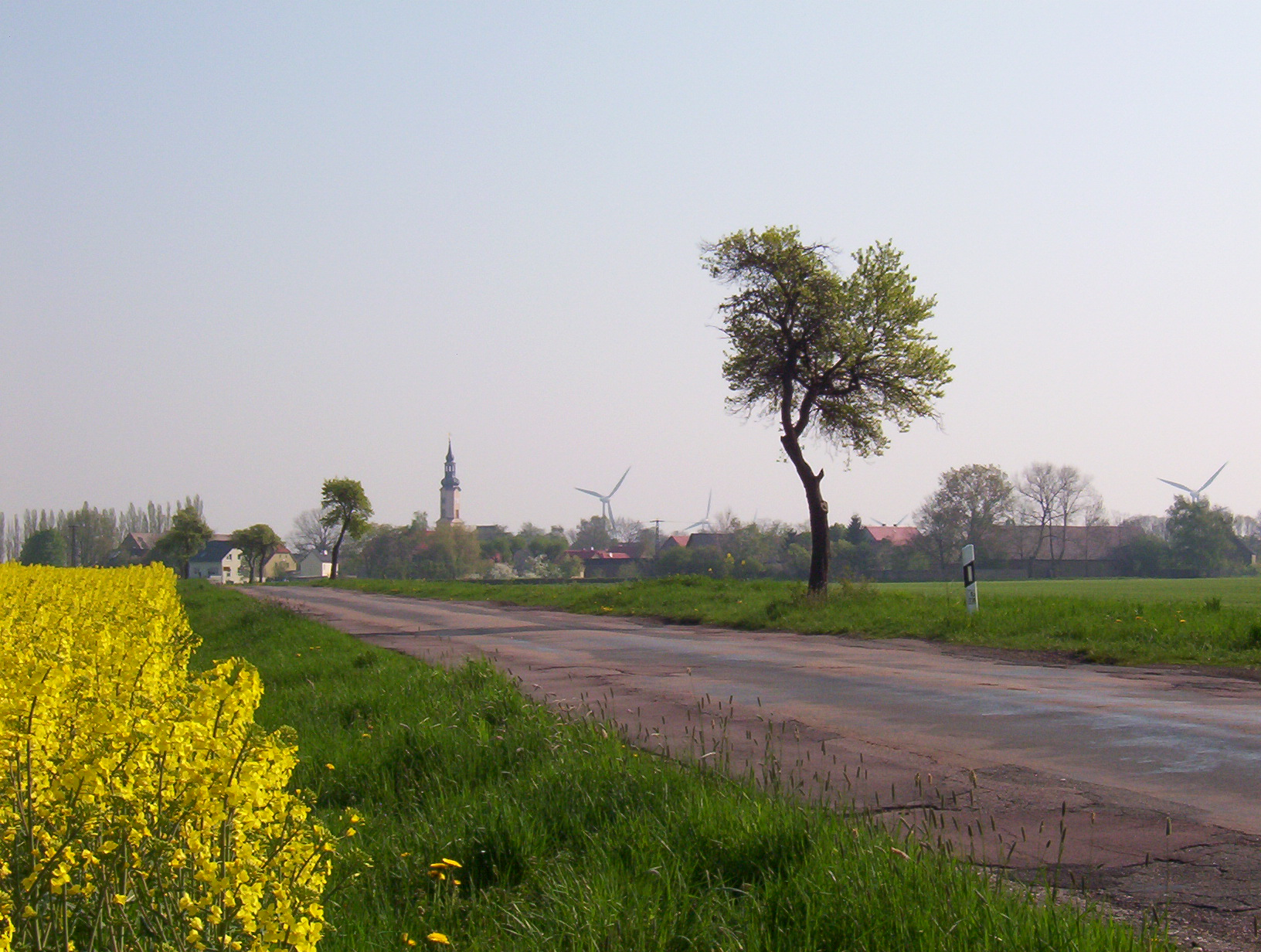
Village scenery east of Leipzig

The Leipzig Bay(German: Leipziger Tieflandsbucht) or Leipzig Basin or Saxon Lowland or Saxon Bay is a very flat, originally lakeless and highly fertile plain in Central Germany, in northwestern Saxony and southeastern Saxony-Anhalt, anchored by the foothills of the Harz mountains in the northwest and of the Ore Mountains in the southeast.

This region was originally covered with dense forests and meandering rivers. In the course of urbanization and lignite open pit mining, large areas were deforested and many rivers and streams canalised or diverted. The Leipzig Bay is bounded to the north by the Düben Heath, to the east by the River Elbe, to the south by the Ore Mountain Foreland and the Central Saxon Hills, and by the River Saale to the west. The conurbation formed by the two cities of Leipzig and Halle lies in the centre of the Leipzig Bay. Other important towns are Delitzsch, Eilenburg, Merseburg and Borna.

== Geology ==
The Leipzig Bay is a Young Drift landscape and the southernmost part of the North German Plain. The landscape is essentially a plain broken only by low eminences such as the Hohburg Hills and dissected by the valleys of the Saale, White Elster, Mulde, and Pleiße rivers.

The Leipzig Bay was formed during the Tertiary period. When the Ore Mountains and Vogtland were uplifted, a basin was formed as a compensating movement, into which weathering material from the mountain ranges was deposited. As a result of the creation of bogs and variable flooding, organic material was also deposited in this basin, which in turn was overlaid by sediments. Brown coal or lignite was formed from these deposits, which is covered by layers of sand and loess.

== Location ==
The landscape is very well served by communications. A cardioid ring motorway runs around the Leipzig-Halle conurbation, the so-called Central German Loop (Mitteldeutsche Schleife). Leipzig/Halle Airport is an important transport hub in the eastern German states. Railway lines and Bundesstraßen (federal roads) run in all directions of the compass, linking the Leipzig Bay with other parts of the country. Only inland shipping has no direct access to this region, although work on the unfinished Elster-Saale Canal began in the mid 20th century.

== Importance ==
The Leipzig region is historically, culturally and economically of huge importance to Central Germany. Although open-cast mining continues in the area, it is also being developed from an environmental and tourist perspective, through the reclamation of old lignite pits and mining facilities and their conversion into recreation areas, especially north and south of Leipzig. By flooding some the open-cast mines many new lakes have been and are being created in the Leipzig Basin, which are gradually changing the face of the landscape.

== See also ==
- List of landscapes in Saxony
- Leipzig River Network

== Literature ==
- Dickinson, Robert E (1964). Germany: A regional and economic geography (2nd ed.). London: Methuen. ASIN B000IOFSEQ.
- Donath, Matthias (2010). Leipziger Land. Kulturlandschaften Sachsens Bd. 2, Edition Leipzig, Leipzig.
