= Central Saxon Loess Hill Country =

- Native name: Mittelsächsisches Lösshügelland
- Classification: Natural regions of the Free State of Saxony
- Natural region: Saxon Loess Fields
- Macrogeochore: Central Saxon Loess Hill Country
- State(s): Saxony
- Country: Germany

The Central Saxon Loess Hill Country (German: Mittelsächsisches Lösshügelland), also called the Central Saxon Loess Hills is a natural region in central Saxony.

It is bounded in the south to an extent by the Tharandt Forest. In the west the Freiberger and Zwickauer Mulde merge into the Mulde. The region is characterized by loess deposits from the ice age. On the plains there are virtually no woods. These are to be found exclusively on the valley slopes of the rivers (the Mulde and its headstreams, the Freiberger and Zwickauer Mulde). The Central Saxon Loess Hill Country is of great importance for agriculture, e.g. for growing vegetables and fruit.

== See also ==
- Central Saxon Hills
- Natural regions of Saxony
