= Zittau Basin =

- Eastern Upper Lusatia
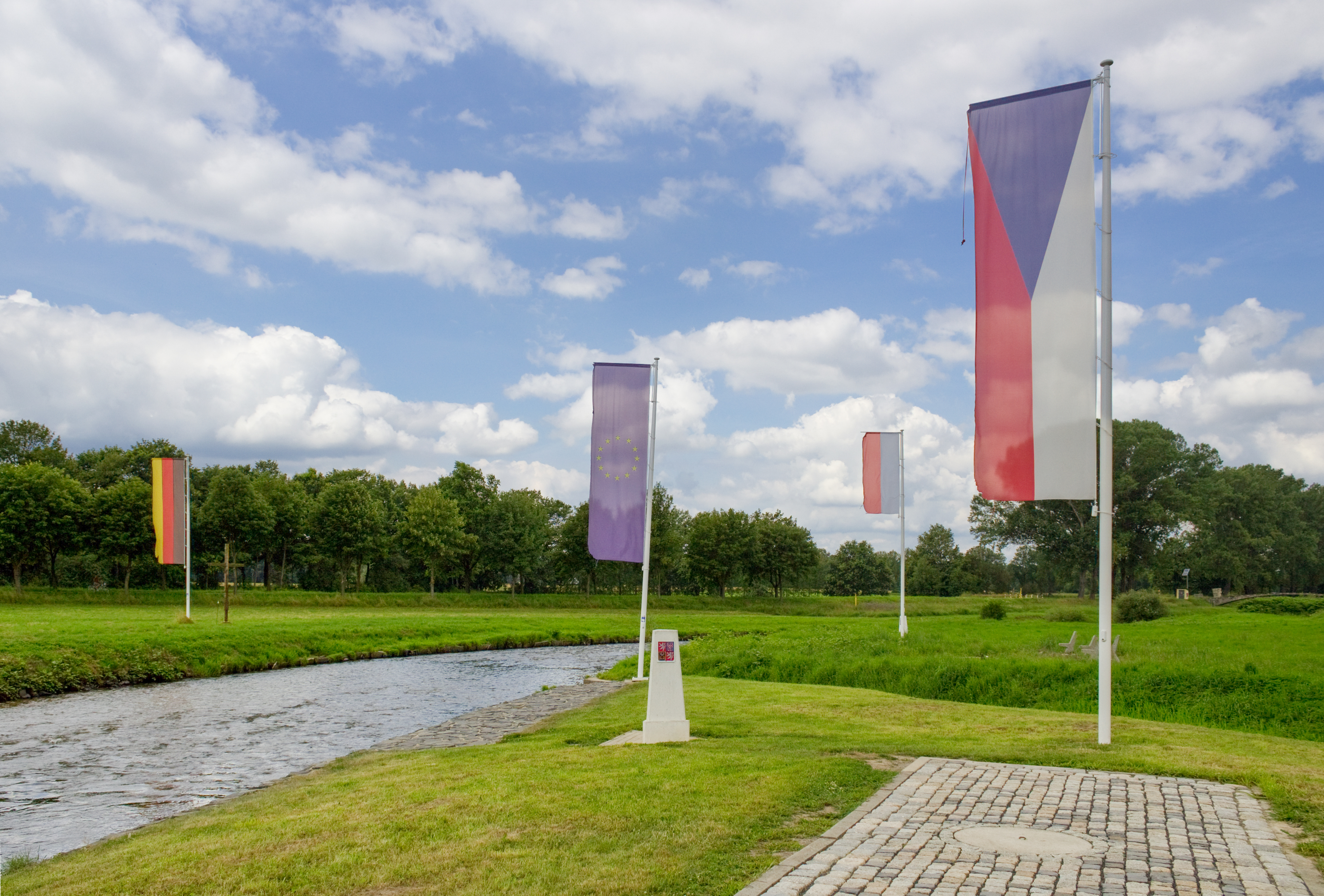
- Tripoint of Germany, Czech Republic and Poland in the Zittau Basin

Highest point
- Peak: Prosečský hřeben
- Elevation: 593 m (1,946 ft)
- Coordinates: 50°52′N 14°49′E

Dimensions
- Area: 1,147 km^{2} (443 mi^{2})

Geography
- Countries: Germany, Poland and Czech Republic
- State/ Region/ Voivodeship: Saxony/ Lower Silesian/ Liberec
- Parent range: Western Sudetes

Zittau Basin (German: Östliche Oberlausitz; Czech: Žitavská pánev, Polish: Kotlina Żytawska) is a natural region in Germany (Saxony), Czech Republic (Liberec Region) and Poland (Lower Silesian Voivodeship). It is a mesoregion of the Western Sudetes. The German part is also called Eastern Upper Lusatia.

== Location and boundaries ==
Zittau Basin is a mesoregion of the Western Sudetes within the Bohemian Massif province. The region runs in a north-south direction between the towns of Görlitz and Zittau in Germany to Bogatynia in Poland and Liberec and Jablonec nad Nisou in the Czech Republic. In the north it borders the Upper Lusatian Heath and Pond Landscape, in the south the Lusatian Mountains and Ještěd–Kozákov Ridge, in the west the Upper Lusatian Gefilde and the Lusatian Highlands, and in the east the Jizera Foothills and Jizera Mountains. Its eastern part is bisected by the Lusatian Neisse River. Geographical features of particular note in the region are the Königshain Hills, the Neisse valley and the old mining landscapes south of Görlitz and in the Zittau Basin.

The highest point is Prosečský hřeben at 593 metres (1,946 ft) above sea level, located between the Czech cities of Liberec and Jablonec nad Nisou.

== Natural region divisions ==
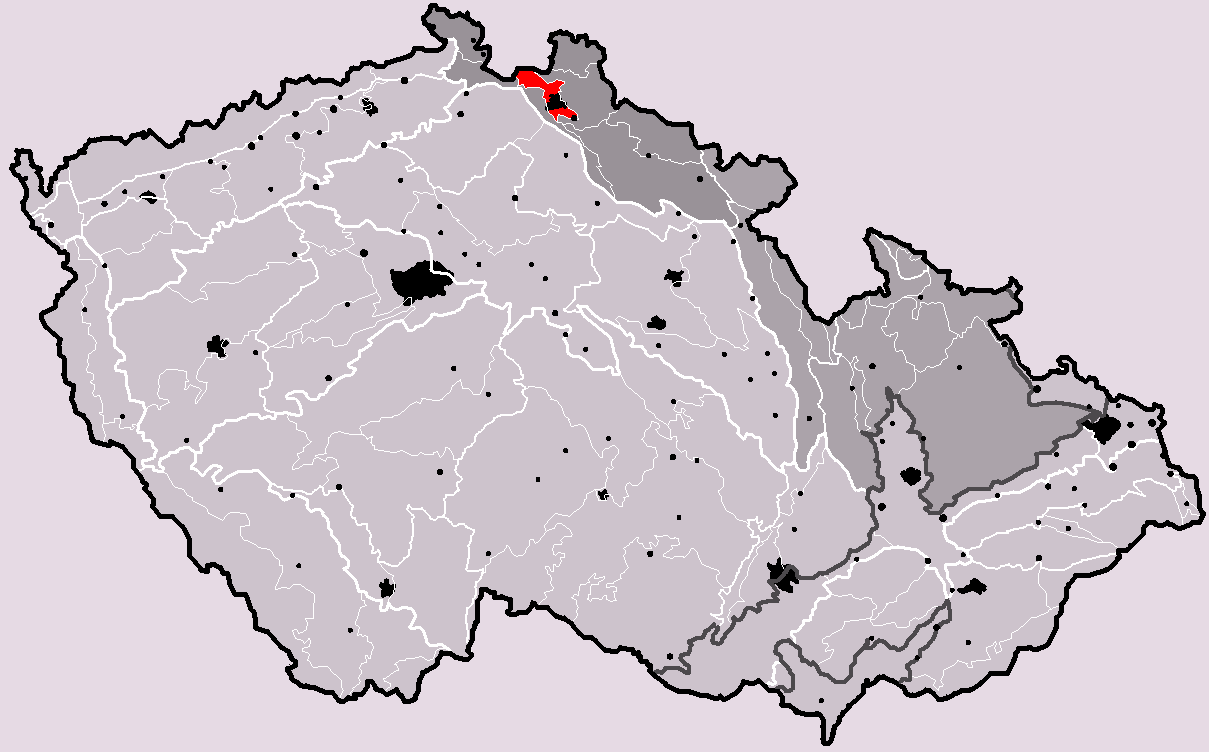
Zittau Basin in the geomophological system of the Czech Republic

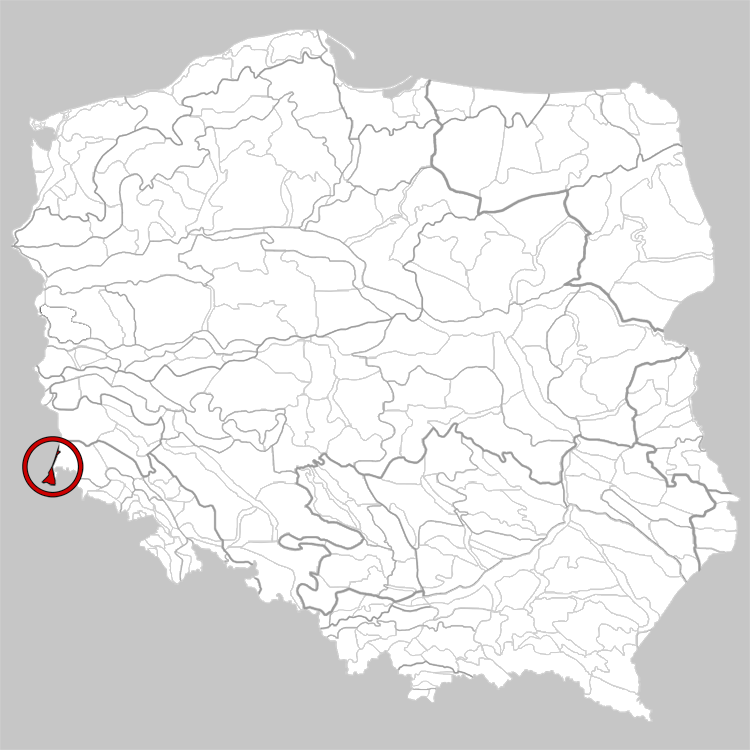
Zittau Basin in the geomophological system of Poland

In the Czech Republic the entire area is known as Žitavská pánev. Within the Czech Republic, the mesoregion has an area of 187 km^{2} (72 sq mi) and an average elevation of 384 m (1,260 ft). It is further subdivided into the microregions of Liberec Valley and Hrádek Basin.

In Poland, the mesoregion is known as Kotlina Żytawska (formerly Obniżenie Żytawsko-Zgorzeleckie, lit. 'Zittau–Zgorzelec Depression') and has an area of about 240 km^{2} (93 sq mi).

In Germany, the mesoregion has an area of 720 km^{2} (280 sq mi) and is known as Östliche Oberlausitz (Eastern Upper Lusatia), whereas only a part of it is referred to by the term Zittauer Becken (Zittau Basin). According to the German division, the mesoregion is divided into twelve mesogeochores:

- 12 Eastern Upper Lusatia
  - 11002 Zittau Basin (65.04 km²)
  - 11003 Großschönau Basin and Kuppenland (60.97 km² in Saxony; continues into the Czech Republic)
  - 11004 Großhennersdorf Loess Hills (100.83 km²)
  - 11005 Loess Ridge bei Hirschfelde (19.51 km²)
  - 11006 Neugersdorf Loess Ridge (50.14 km² in Saxony; partly in the Czech Republic)
  - 11007 Ruppersdorfer Loess Plateaux (34.78 km²)
  - 11008 Herrnhuter Loess Hills (60.62 km²)
  - 11009 Loess plateaux on the Eigen (43.67 km²)
  - 11010 Neiße Valley near Görlitz (33.20 km²)
  - 11011 Görlitz Loess Plateaux (105.44 km²)
  - 11012 Reichenbach Loess Hills (79.14 km²)
  - 11013 Königshain Hills (66.49 km²)

== Landscape and geology ==
The natural region is very varied and characterized by hill ranges, isolated hills, plateau and basins alongside one another. Ice age ground moraines, meltwater sands and the overlying loess soils fill out the granite relief to varying degrees. The loess loam is generally only about 1 to 1.5 m thick. As witnesses to the Tertiary volcanism of the area there are lava plains and isolated hills of basalt and phonolite. In the Zittau and Oderwitz Basin, as well as the Berzdorf Basin there are important deposits of brown coal in the sediments.

Climatically Zittau Basin lies partially in the lee of the Upper Lusatian Highlands. For example, only 665 mm of precipitation falls annually. The average annual temperature lies between 8 and 8.6 °C. The potential natural vegetation here is wood bedstraw-European hornbeam-oak forest with small-leaved lindens.
