= Hügelland =

Landscape consisting of low, rolling hills

Hügelland (German: [ˈhyːɡl̩ˌlant]) is a type of landscape consisting of low rolling hills whose topography or surface structure lies between that of a lowland region (plains or river terraces) and that of a more rugged hill range or low mountain range. The term is German and has no exact equivalent in English, but is often translated as "hill country", "hilly terrain", "upland(s)" or "gently undulating" or "rolling country", or "rolling countryside". It is derived from Hügel, a low hill or hillock and appears frequently as a proper name for this type of terrain.

The term Hügelland is not unambiguously defined, even in German. For example, on the plains of North Germany, Poland or Hungary it may be applied to terrain with a height variation of just 50 metres, whilst in the Alpine Foreland or in the Voralpen it might refer to terrain with a height difference of at least 100–200 metres. On the other hand, some scholars prefer to define Hügelland by its height above sea level; for example, applying it to terrain between 200 and 500 metres above sea level.

== Structure ==
Structurally and geomorphologically, a Hügelland landscape has a significant proportion of less well-defined components. For example:

- It is topographically not as clearly defined a mountain or hill range,
- which is why it usually exhibits variable erosion (the aspects of its slopes facing all points of the compass) and
- why it rarely has series of parallel watercourses such as those typically created in hilly or mountainous terrain.
- Settlements may be located either in the valleys or on the heights (which offered sunny sites in winter, sheltered leeward locations and, formerly, better defensive positions);
- Arable usage is equally diverse - depending on soil type, local climate and groundwater.
- The formation of the terrain often has geological causes that differ from those of hills and mountains:

Hills and mountains are caused by folding along tectonic weaknesses or fault lines, which are then followed by rivers. This results in a parallel pattern, which can be made even more regular through erosion. Hügelland rarely exhibits these properties.

When the gently rolling hills of a Hügelland are suitable for agriculture, their small-scale nature is further reinforced, which may result in a colourful succession of mixed forest and open areas with pastures, meadows, arable crops and orchards, divided by hedgerows along the tracks, lanes and embankments. Mixed woodland, hedges, ponds and scattered settlements occur, giving the appearance of a mosaic from the air.

== Regions named Hügelland ==
The regions listed below have Hügelland as part of their proper name. Several also have alternative English-language names.

- Austria:
  - Mattersburger Hügelland, Burgenland
  - Oststeirisches Hügelland, Styria
- Germany:
  - Aachener Hügelland, North Rhine-Westphalia
  - Alzeyer Hügelland, Rhineland-Palatinate
  - Angelner Hügelland, Schleswig-Holstein
  - Mittelsächsisches Hügelland, Saxony
  - Nordthüringer Hügelland, Thuringia
  - Ostbraunschweigisches Hügelland, Lower Saxony
  - Schleswig-Holsteinisches Hügelland, Schleswig-Holstein
  - Spalter Hügelland, Bavaria
  - Unterbayerisches Hügelland, Bavaria
- Switzerland
  - Freiburger Hügelland

== Other examples ==
- Austria:
  - Upper Austria: Innviertel, Hausruckviertel
  - Lower Austria: Bucklige Welt, parts of Mostviertel; Weinviertel, Wienerwaldsee
  - South Burgenland
  - SE-Carinthia
- Germany
  - Baden-Württemberg: Jagst-Ries, Kraichgau
  - Bavaria: Haßlacherbergkette in North-Upper Franconia, Middle Franconia, Upper Swabia
  - Brandenburg/Saxony-Anhalt: Fläming
  - Rhineland-Palatinate: Rhenish Hesse
  - Lower Saxony: Lüneburg Heath
  - Mecklenburg-Vorpommern: Baltic Uplands, Feldberg Lake District, Mecklenburg Switzerland
  - North Rhine-Westphalia: Baumberge and Beckum Hills, Münsterland
  - Saxony: Lower Lusatia, North Saxony
  - Schleswig-Holstein: Holstein Switzerland, Hütten Hills
- Italy:
  - The Langhe in the Piemont, between Turin and the Ligurian Alps
- Poland:
  - Pomeranian Lakeland, Prussian-, Baltic Uplands
  - Lower Silesia, Lodz region
- Switzerland
  - Parts of the Jura
  - Swiss Plateau, Napf
- Hungary, Romania, Serbia
  - Göcsej, Raabtal, Balaton-South; Buda Hills, Zemplín
  - Slavonia, Batschka, Banat, Siebenbürgen, Dobruja

== Similar concepts ==
An example of Hügelland outside Europe is Rwanda in Africa, whose character is expressed by its French name of Pays de Mille Collines ("Land of a Thousand Hills").

In Sweden the term undulating hilly land (Swedish: bergkullsterräng) is used since Sten Rudberg coined the concept in 1960. In the Swedish context this means hilly areas made up of crystalline rocks of the Baltic Shield that are often contrasted with joint valley landscapes, the Sub-Cambrian peneplain and plains with residual hills. In southern Sweden the undulating hilly lands are coterminous with the Sub-Mesozoic hilly peneplains, an ancient surface formed by weathering in warm and humid climates during the Mesozoic.
