= Upper Lusatian Heath and Pond Landscape =

Coordinates: 51°21′N 14°30′E

The Upper Lusatian Heath and Pond Landscape (also ... District or ... Lake District, German: Oberlausitzer Heide- und Teichgebiet; Upper Sorbian: Hornjołužyska krajina holy a hatow) is a natural region in Saxony. It runs from a line between Wittichenau and Kamenz for roughly 60 kilometres in an east-west direction as far as the River Neisse. Its width between the bordering natural regions of the Upper Lusatian Gefilde and Eastern Upper Lusatia to the south and the Muskau Heath and Upper Lusatian Mining Region to the north is between 15 and 20 kilometres.

The landscape is a transition zone between the hilly southern part of Upper Lusatia and Lower Lusatia. Its central part takes in the Upper Lusatian Heath and Pond Landscape Biosphere Reserve, whose core zone is a nature reserve.

The region is part of the Saalian glaciation meltwater valley or urstromtal. Valley sands close to the groundwater level at heights of between 130 and 150 metres alternate with stretches of valley bottom over 500 metres wide and only a few metres lower. Dry areas lie next to waterlogged or even boggy areas.

Almost 10% of the area is made up of 335 ponds, which makes the Upper Lusatian Heath and Lake District the largest economically utilized pond region in Europe.

Part of the original landscape was destroyed by the brown coal open-cast mine around the Boxberg Power Station, however the pits left behind have been flooded and now form a new part of the countryside.

The potential natural vegetation (pnV) is birch and oak-pine woods, with alder and ash woods in the water meadows.
