= List of regions of Saxony =

List of regions in Saxony

A classification of the various regions of Saxony cannot be achieved in any uniform or standard way, as the commonly used names usually represent a mixture of historical regions and geographical features. Many well-known names of regions, such as Lusatia, comprise a mixture of natural habitats and geological zones, while other, scientifically assigned, names are only known in university departments.

The following list contains, in alphabetical order, both those names that are commonly used, as well as those only known regionally or used in the scientific field. They are listed by their English names with their German names in brackets. Names of settlements or other geographic features are omitted here.

Overall, across much of the area, Saxony belongs both to Eastern Germany and Central Germany. However, on a smaller scale there are many regions and landscapes that overlap the boundaries of the Free State and extend beyond it:

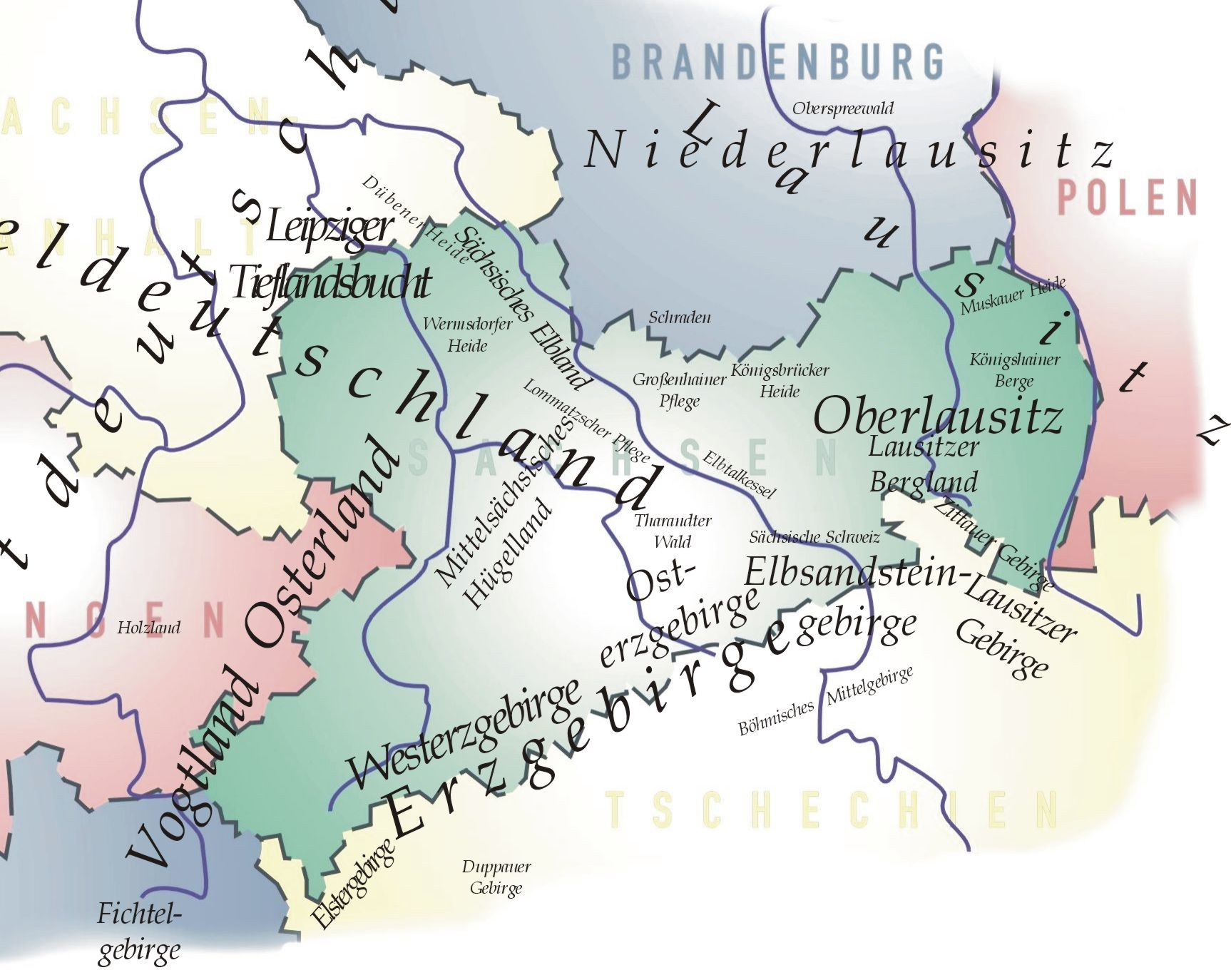
Map of several important regions of Saxony and its neighbouring states and countries

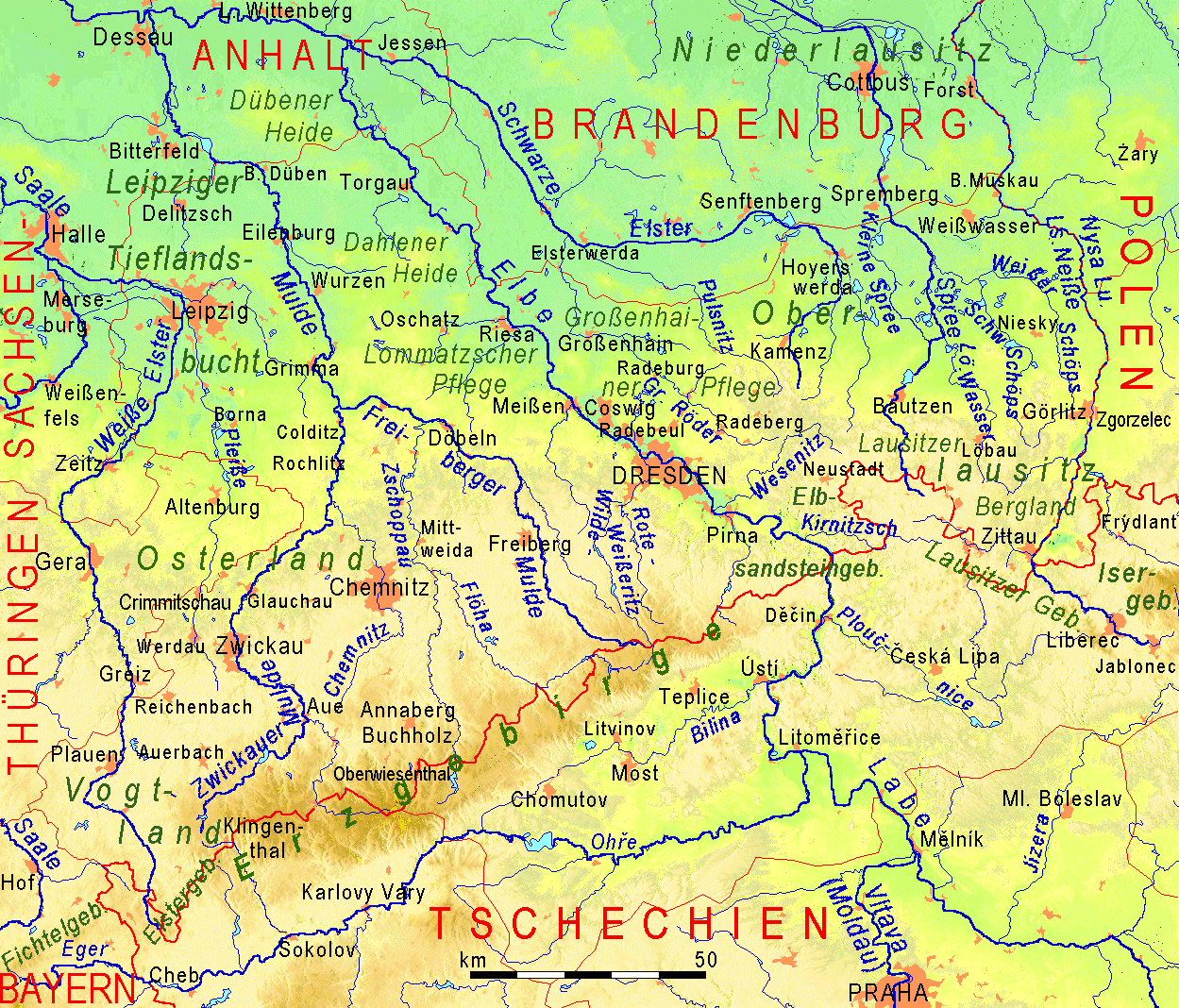
Topography of Saxony

- Bahra Valley (Bahratal)
- Biela Valley (Bielatal)
- Dahlen Heath (Dahlener Heide)
- Dippoldiswald Heath (Dippoldiswalder Heide)
- Dresden Basin (Elbtalkessel or Elbtalweitung)
- Dresden Heath (Dresdner Heide)
- Düben Heath (Dübener Heide)
- Eastern Ore Mountains (Osterzgebirge)
- Elbe Sandstone Mountains (Elbsandsteingebirge)
- Elster Mountains (Elstergebirge)
- Flöha Valley (Flöhatal)
- Geyersch Forest (Geyerscher Wald)
- Gimmlitz Valley (Gimmlitztal)
- Großenhainer Pflege (Großenhainer Pflege)
- Kirnitzsch Valley (Kirnitzschtal)
- Königsbrück Heath (Königsbrücker Heide)
- Königshain Hills (Königshainer Berge)
- Lusatian Highlands (Lausitzer Bergland)
- Lusatian Mountains (Lausitzer Gebirge)
- Laußnitz Heath (Laußnitzer Heide)
- Leipzig Bay (Leipziger Tieflandsbucht)
- Lößnitz (Lößnitz)
- Lommatzscher Pflege (Lommatzscher Pflege)
- Lower Lusatia (Niederlausitz)
- Meissen Upland (Meißner Hochland)
- Central Saxon Hills (Mittelsächsisches Hügelland)
- Moritzburg Kleinkuppen District (Moritzburger Kleinkuppenlandschaft)
- Moritzburg Lake District (Moritzburger Teichgebiet)
- Mothäus Heath (Mothäuser Heide)
- Muskau Heath (Muskauer Heide)
- Natzschung Valley (Natzschungtal)
- North Saxon Heathland (Nordsächsisches Heideland)
- Ore Mountains (Erzgebirge)
- Ore Mountain Foreland (Erzgebirgsvorland)
- Ostelbien (Ostelbien)
- Osterland
- Poisenwald (Poisenwald)
- Rabenauer Grund (Rabenauer Grund)
- Reinhardtsgrimma Heath (Reinhardtsgrimmaer Heide)
- Saxon Switzerland (Sächsische Schweiz)
- Saxon Elbeland (Sächsisches Elbland)
- Saxon Lowland (Sächsisches Hügelland)
- Schönfeld Upland (Schönfelder Hochland)
- Schraden
- Schrammsteine
- Striegistal
- Seifersdorf Valley (Seifersdorfer Tal)
- Spaar Mountains (Spaargebirge)
- Southwest Saxony (Südwestsachsen)
- Tharandt Forest (Tharandter Wald)
- Upper Lusatia (Oberlausitz)
- Vogtland
- Werdau Forest (Werdauer Wald)
- Wermsdorf Forest (Wermsdorfer Forst)
- Valleys west of the Elbe (Linkselbische Täler) between Dresden and Meißen
- Western Ore Mountains (Westerzgebirge)
- Wildenfels Mountains (Wildenfelser Zwischengebirge)
- Zeißig Forest (Zeißigwald)
- Zell Forest (Zellwald)
- Zittau Mountains (Zittauer Gebirge)

== See also ==
- List of landscapes in Rhineland-Palatinate
