= Saxon Loess Fields =

Coordinates: 51.0000°N 13.0000°E

Natural regions in Saxony
- Native name: Sächsisches Lössgefilde
- Classification: Natural regions of the Free State of Saxony
- Natural region: Saxon Loess Fields
- State(s): Saxony
- Country: Germany

The Saxon Loess Fields (German: Sächsisches Lössgefilde) refer to a natural region that lies mainly within the state of Saxony in central Germany. In addition, small areas of this region extend to the northwest and west into Saxony-Anhalt (the land around Weißenfels), to the southeast into Thuringia (the region around Altenburg) and to the northeast into Brandenburg. It more-or-less combines the BfN's major regions listed as D19 Saxon Upland and Ore Mountain Foreland, (Sächsisches Hügelland und Erzgebirgsvorland) and D14, Upper Lusatia (Oberlausitz); only the range of Central Uplands hills, the Lusatian Mountains, has been excluded and instead forms part of the Saxon Highlands and Uplands (Sächsisches Bergland und Mittelgebirge).

== Natural regions ==
The following list breaks down the region into major units based on Meynen (three-figure numbers). New major units, that combine the earlier ones, are arranged above these without any preceding numbers (Locations defined in brackets).

- Saxon Loess Fields
  - (major groupings no longer used)
    - 44 (=D14) Upper Lusatia (except 441 - Lusatian Highlands)
      - Eastern Upper Lusatia
        - 440 Neiße trough (east and south)
        - 442 East Lusatian Foothills (west)
      - 444 Upper Lusatian Fields
      - West Lusatian Upland and Highlands
        - 443 West Lusatian Foothills (southeast to northeast)
  - D 19 Saxon Upland and Ore Mountain Foreland
    - 46 Saxon Upland or Saxon Uplands (including Leipziger Land)
      - (continuation of the West Lusatian Upland and Highlands)
        - 461 Lusatian Plateau (west)
      - 460 Dresden Basin
      - 462 Großenhain Pflege
      - 463 Central Saxon Loess Upland
      - North Saxon Plateau and Upland
        - 464 Oschatz Upland (east)
        - 465 Grimma Porphyric Upland (west)
      - 466 Altenburg-Zeitz Loess Upland
      - 467 Leipziger Land
    - 45 Ore Mountain Foreland
      - 450 Mulde Loess Hills
      - 451 Ore Mountain Basin
        - 452 Upper Pleißeland (west of the basin; nowadays usually counted as part of it)

== See also ==
- Natural regions of Germany
