= Saxon Uplands =

Landscape in Saxony, Germany

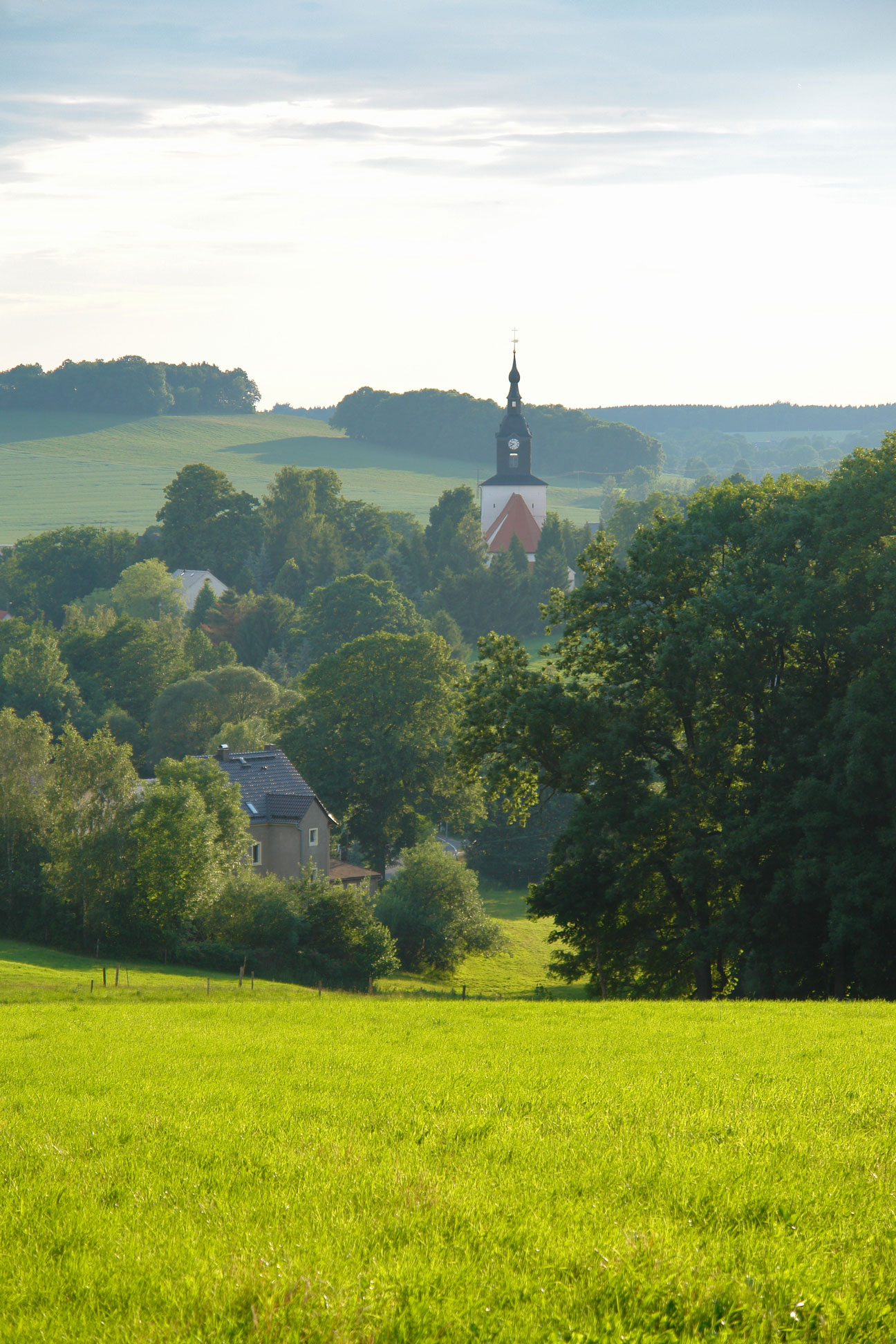
Frankenstein in the Ore Mountain Foreland

The Saxon Uplands, Saxon Hills or Ore Mountain Foreland (German: Erzgebirgsvorland) is a strip of countryside of about 200 m to 500 m above sea level (NN) high, in the German state of Saxony. It lies immediately north of the German Ore Mountains and runs mainly through the areas of Zwickauer Land, Zwickau, Chemnitzer Land, Chemnitz, Mittelsachsen and the country south of Dresden. It borders on the Upper Pleißeland to the extreme west, the Ore Mountain Basin in the south and the Mulde Loess Hills to the north and east.

Immediately north of the Western and Central Ore Mountains lie the cities of Zwickau and Chemnitz in the Ore Mountain Basin, whose western extension, the Upper Pleißeland is usually considered part of the basin today. Northeast of Chemnitz a narrow strip of land, the Mulde Loess Hills (Mulde-Lösshügelland) is squeezed in between the Dresden Basin (Elbtalkessel) and the eastern section of the Ore Mountains.

== Natural divisions ==
The Ore Mountains are often divided into the following areas (main units based on Meynen, and, in brackets, the Federal Office for Nature Conservation (Bundesamt für Naturschutz or BfN):

- 45 (part of D19) Saxon Uplands (Erzgebirgsvorland)
  - 450 Central Saxon Loess-Loam Hills (Mittelsächsisches Lößlehmhügelland) (Mulde Loess Loam Hills)
  - 451 Ore Mountain Basin (Erzgebirgisches Becken)
  - 452 Upper Pleißeland (Oberes Pleißeland)

== See also ==
- Geography of Germany
- List of regions of Saxony
- Natural regions of Germany
