= Central Saxon Hills =

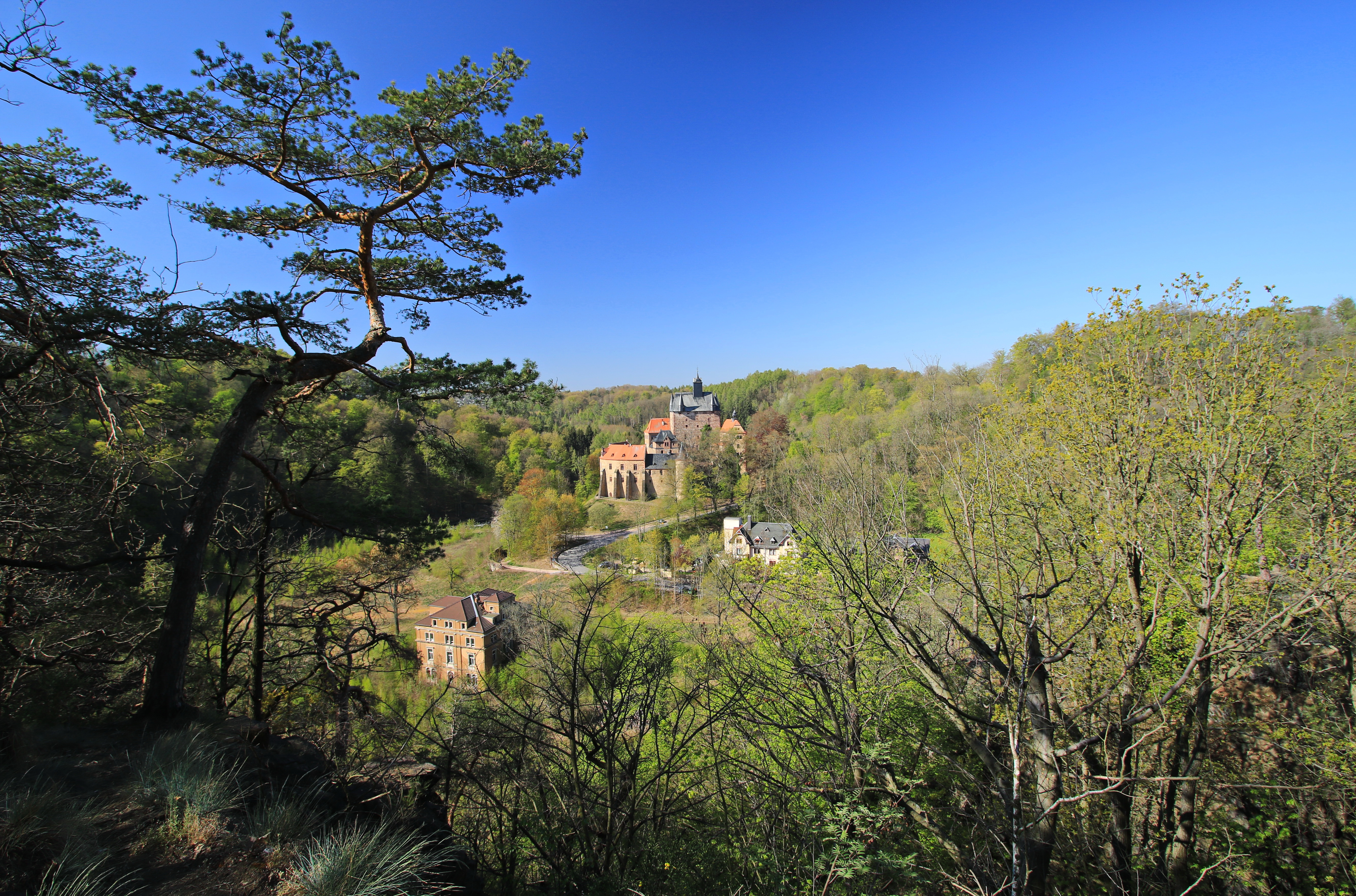
Kriebstein Castle in the Central Saxon Hills, 2020

The Central Saxon Hills (German: Mittelsächsische Hügelland, also called the Sächsisches Burgen- und Heideland), is a region of Hügelland with indistinct boundaries in the centre of the German state of Saxony.

During the Magdalenian period, there were few human settlements in the region.

== Geographic location ==
To the north the region extends roughly as far as the confluence of the Freiberger and Zwickauer Mulde rivers and along the Freiberger Mulde to Nossen and on in the valley of the Triebisch to just before Meissen. Its short eastern boundary runs from Meissen along the Triebisch in a southerly direction to the Tharandt Forest, continuing through it. In the south, the hill country is bounded by an artificial line from the Tharandt Forest and runs north of the cities and towns of Freiberg, Chemnitz, Glauchau and Werdau. In the west the region is bounded by the Thuringian state border, the River Pleiße and a line from Frohburg to the confluence of the two Muldes. According to other sources, the Lommatzscher Pflege and the so-called Oschatz Hill Country (Oschatzer Hügelland) - the latter only referred to in specialist literature - may be included.

The most important rivers in the Central Saxon Hills are the Mulde with its two headstreams, the Freiberger Mulde and Zwickauer Mulde. The largest towns are Döbeln and Grimma.

== Geology and agricultural use ==
The region, with its ice age loess deposits (hence it is sometimes called the Central Saxon Loess Hills or mittelsächsisches Lößhügelland) is heavily dominated by agriculture (fruit and vegetable farming), especially as a result of its very high soil values. The low hills and almost level plains of the Central Saxon Hills are almost entirely unforested. Woods only occur on the valley slopes of the rivers bisecting the region.

== Climate ==
The climate is strongly influenced by the Ore Mountains, with temperatures averaging 8.8 °C (47.8 °F) and yearly precipitation averaging around 750 mm (30 in), with around 470 mm (19 in) falling during the growing season.

== See also ==
- List of regions of Saxony
- Ore Mountain Foreland
