= Lusatian Serbian =

Lusatian Serbian may refer to:

- Lusatian Serbian languages (Sorbian languages)
- Lusatian Serbs (Sorbs)
- Lusatian Serbia (Sorbia)
