= Lusatian Border Ridge =

Geographic region

Coordinates: 51°34′13″N 14°15′37″E

The Lusatian Border Ridge (German: Lausitzer Grenzwall; Lower Sorbian: Łužyska granica; Upper Sorbian: Łužiski hraničny hrjebeń), also called the Lusatian Border Wall, is a natural region in Saxony and South Brandenburg. It lies not far from the town of Weißwasser and is bounded in the south and west by the Muskau Heath and in the north by the Cottbus Sand Plateau. To the west it transitions at the River Dahme into the Lower Fläming; to the east it continues on the far side of the border river of the Lusatian Neisse into Poland as the Wał Trzebnicki (Trebnitz Ridge) as far as the River Bóbr (German: Bober).

The Lusatian Border Ridge and the Muskau Fold Arc consist of about 150,000 year old shove end moraine arcs of the Warthe Stage of the Saalian glaciation, that are characterized by several parallel valleys and ridges. In the area of the push moraines, layers of Cenozoic rock have been pushed up to the surface. The heavily rounded to flat slabs are covered by areas of sandur in the south. The longitudinal valleys are partly filled with water.

By historical times the coal seams in strata near the surface were already being exploited for fuel.

The natural vegetation would be mixed sessile oak-hornbeam-pine woodland, oak and beech forest and mixed beech-sessile oak-English oak woodland.

The Lusatian Border Ridge also forms the boundary between Lower and Upper Lusatia, hence the name, which literally means "Lusatian Border Dyke".
