= Upper Lusatian Gefilde =

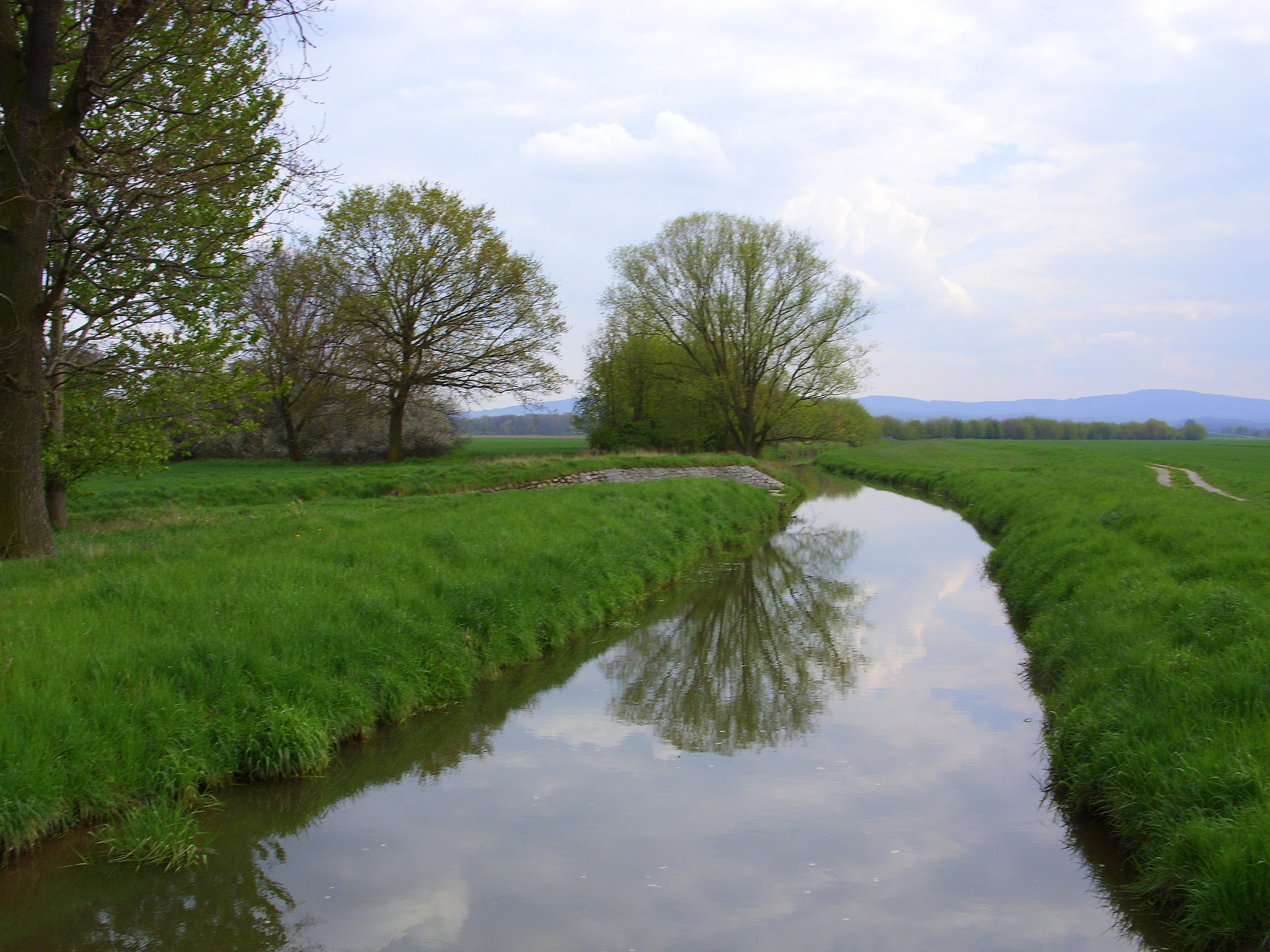
The Kotitzer Wasser stream with a view of the Upper Lusatian Highlands

The Upper Lusatian Gefilde (German: Oberlausitzer Gefilde or sometimes Bautzener Gefilde, Upper Sorbian: Hornjołužiska pahórčina) is a natural region in Saxony near the German tripoint with the Czech Republic and Poland. It is considered part of the Saxon Loess Fields and the Western Sudetes range. Gefilde is German for "fields" or "country".

== Literature ==
- Karl Mannsfeld, Hans Richter (ed.): Naturräume in Sachsen. Trier, 1995.
- Rochus Schrammek: Verkehrs- und Baugeschichte der Stadt Bautzen. Bautzen, 1984.
