= Lower Lusatia =

Historical region in Germany and Poland

Coordinates: 52°N 14°E

Lower Lusatia Niederlausitz, Dolna Łužyca, Delnja Łužica, Łużyce Dolne, Dolní Lužice
- Historical region
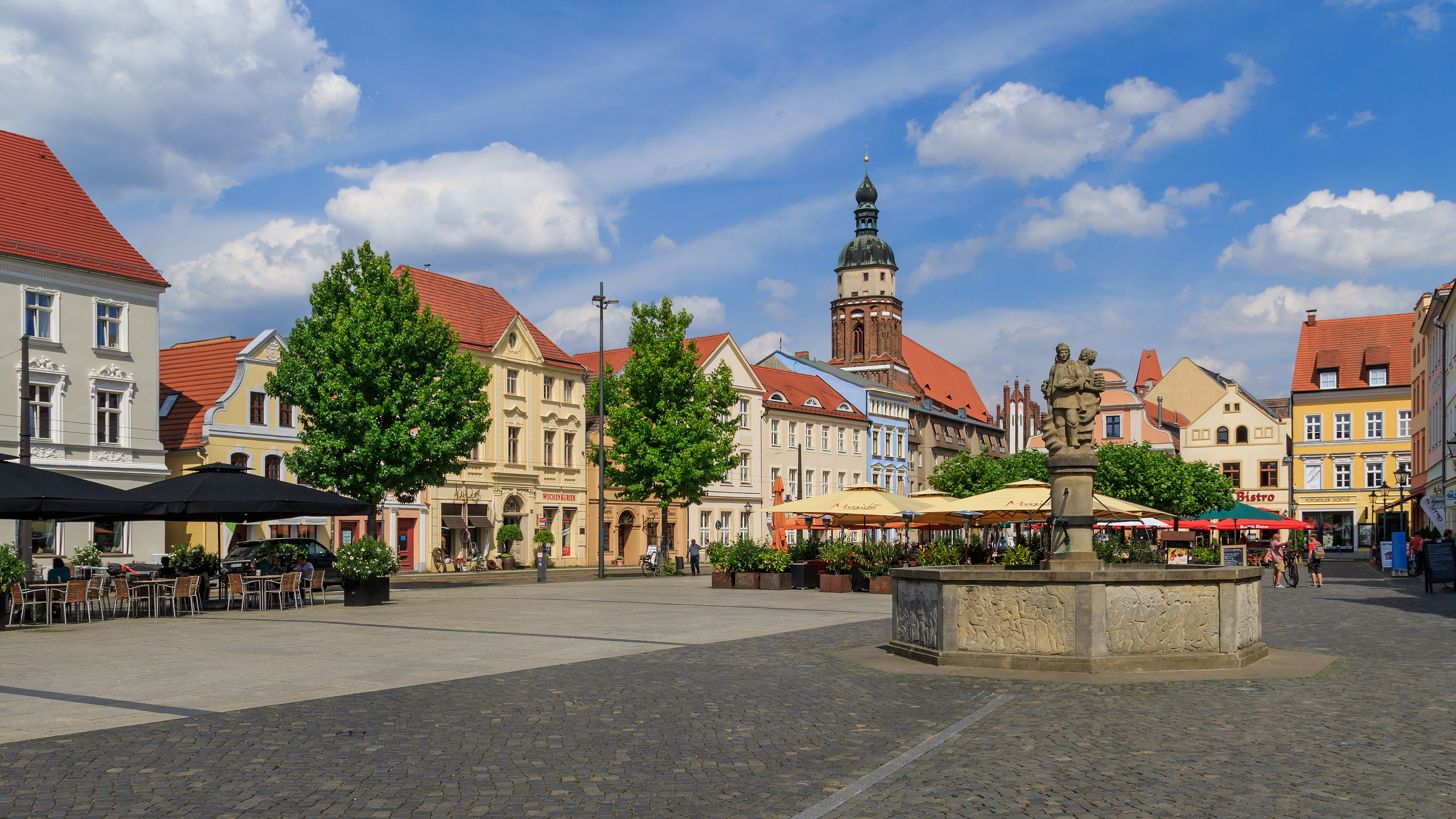
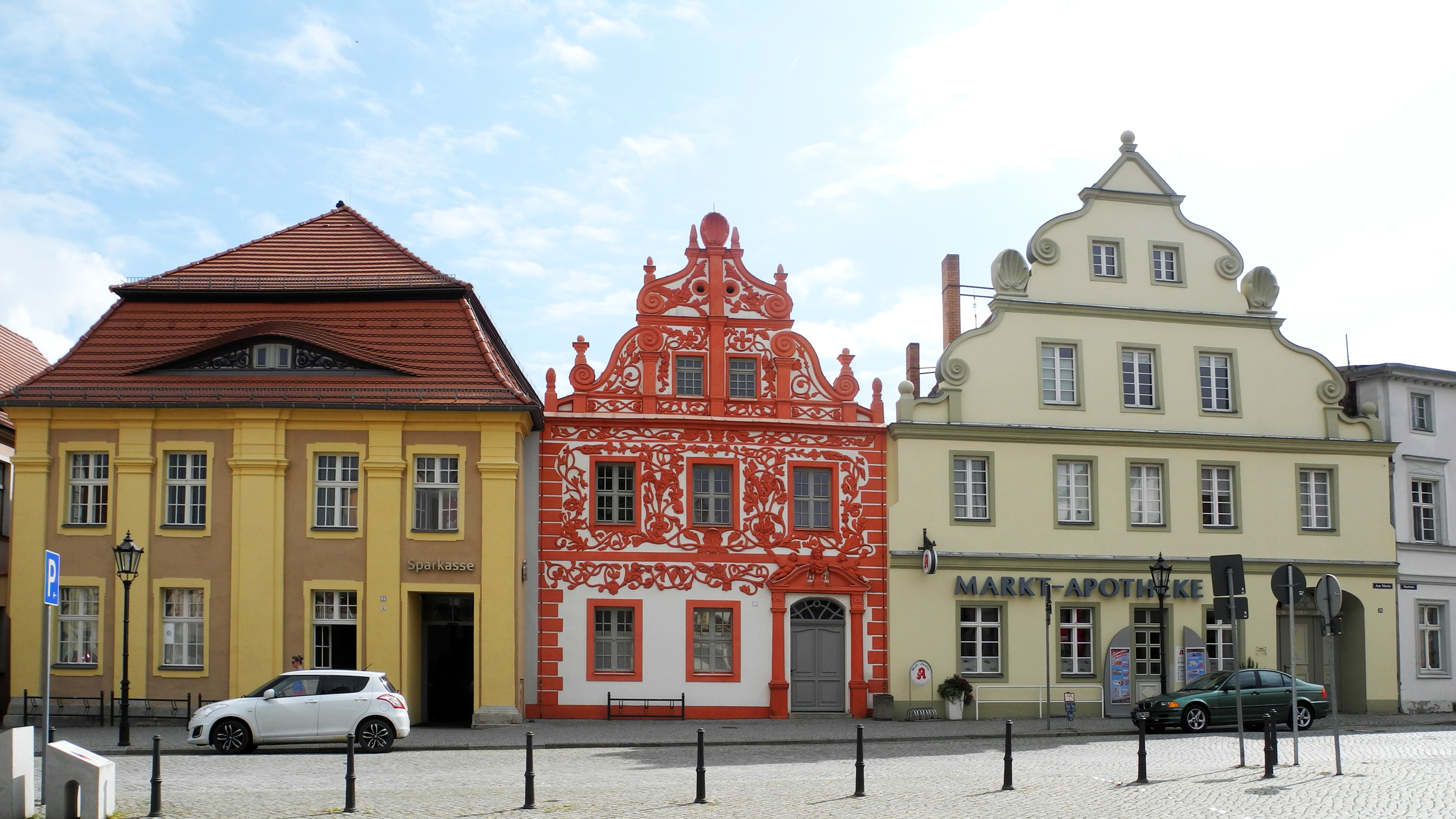
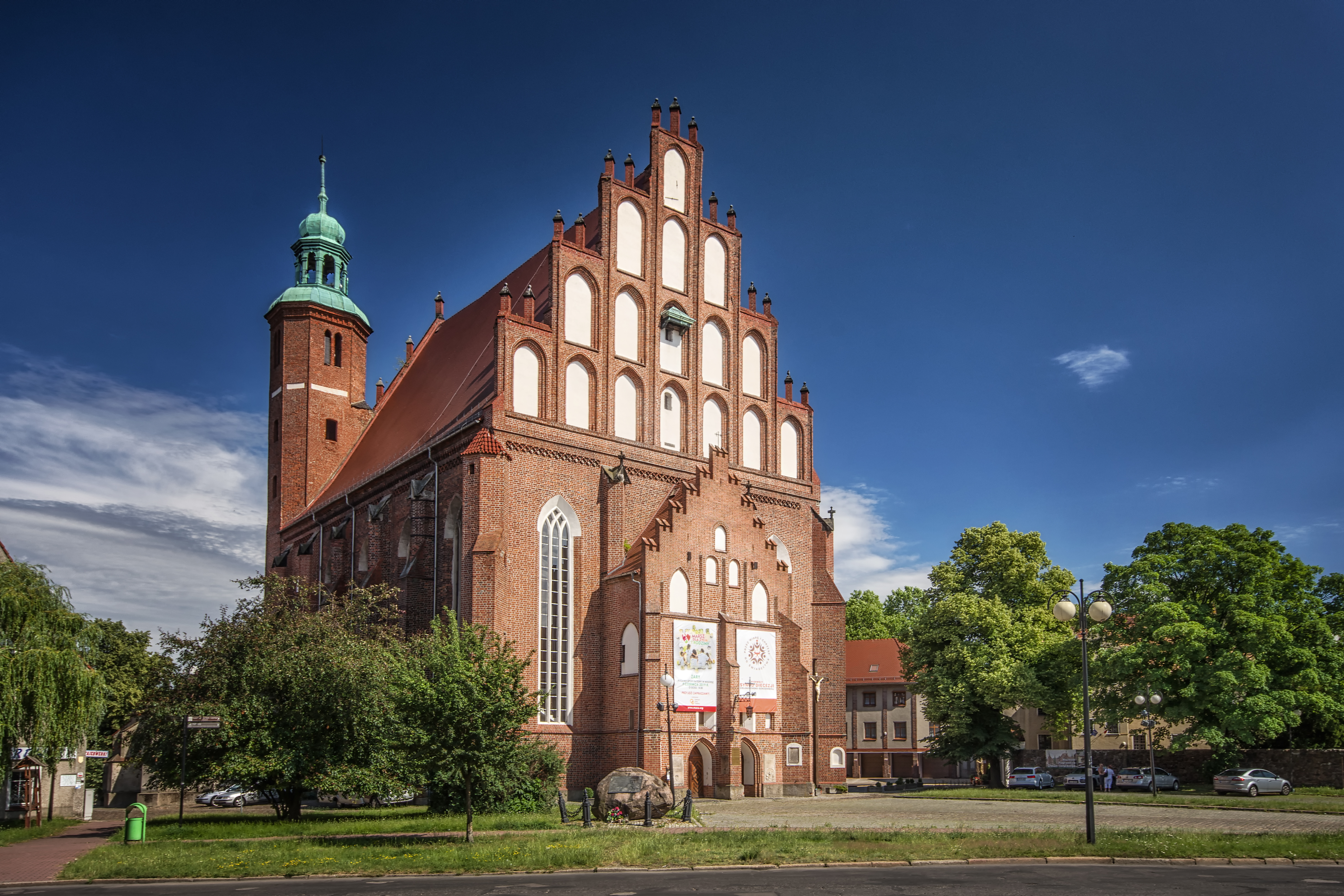
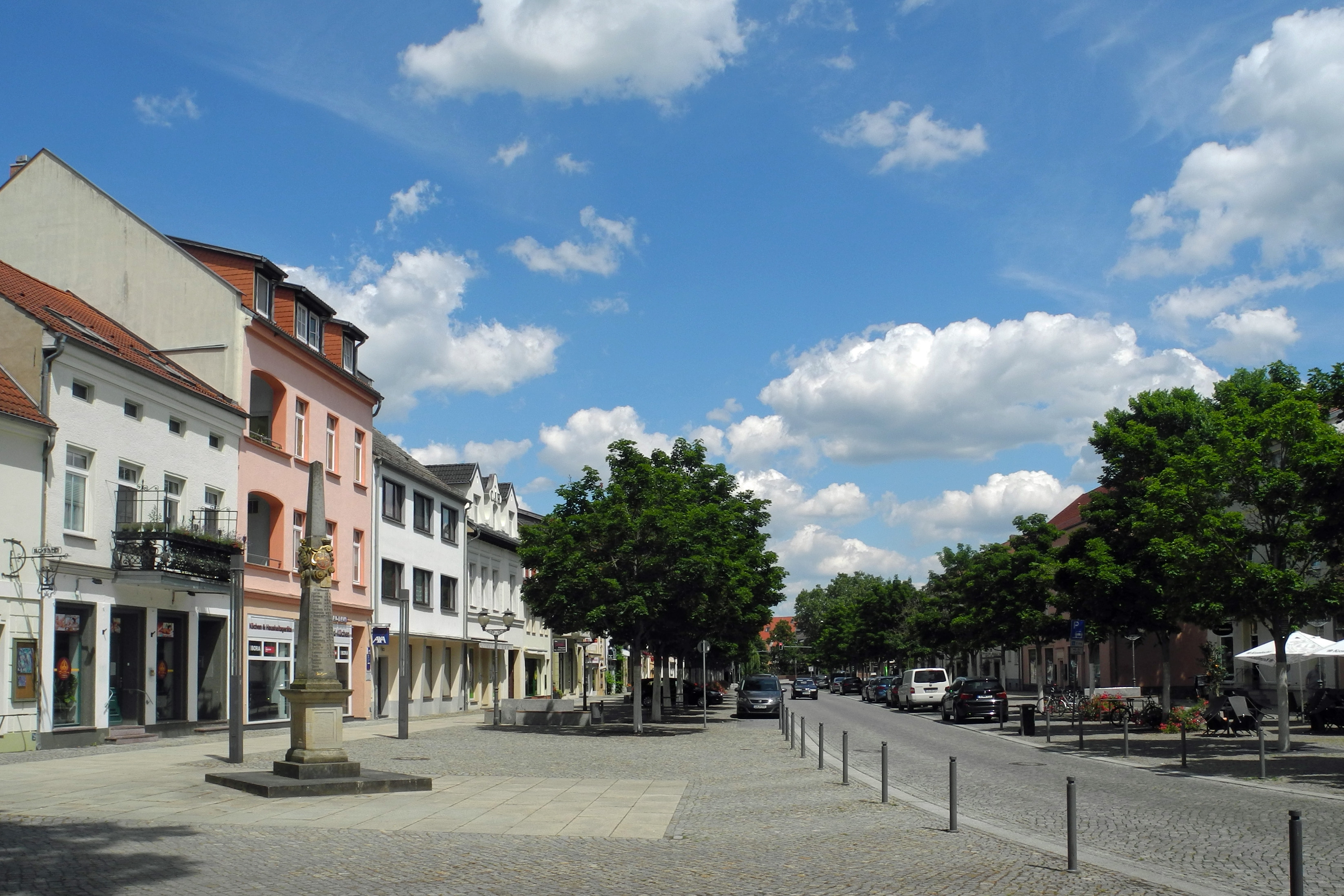
- From top, left to right: Old Market Square in Cottbus; Market Square in Luckau; Holy Heart of Jesus Church in Żary; Street view in Lübben

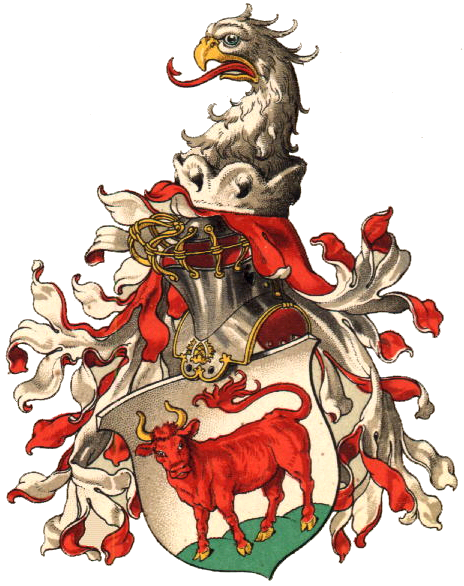
- Flag Coat of arms

- Lower Lusatia within the Holy Roman Empire (1618)
- Countries: Germany; Poland
- Largest city: Cottbus (Chóśebuz)
- Time zone: UTC+1 (CET)
  - Summer (DST): UTC+2 (CEST)

Lower Lusatia (German: Niederlausitz [ˈniːdɐˌlaʊzɪts]; Lower Sorbian: Dolna Łužyca [ˈdɔlna ˈwuʒɨtsa]; Upper Sorbian: Delnja Łužica [ˈdɛlnʲa ˈwuʒitsa]; Polish: Łużyce Dolne; Czech: Dolní Lužice) is a historical region in Central Europe, stretching from the southeast of the German state of Brandenburg to the southwest of Lubusz Voivodeship in Poland. Like adjacent Upper Lusatia in the south, Lower Lusatia is a settlement area of the West Slavic Sorbs whose endangered Lower Sorbian language is related to Upper Sorbian and Polish.

== Geography ==
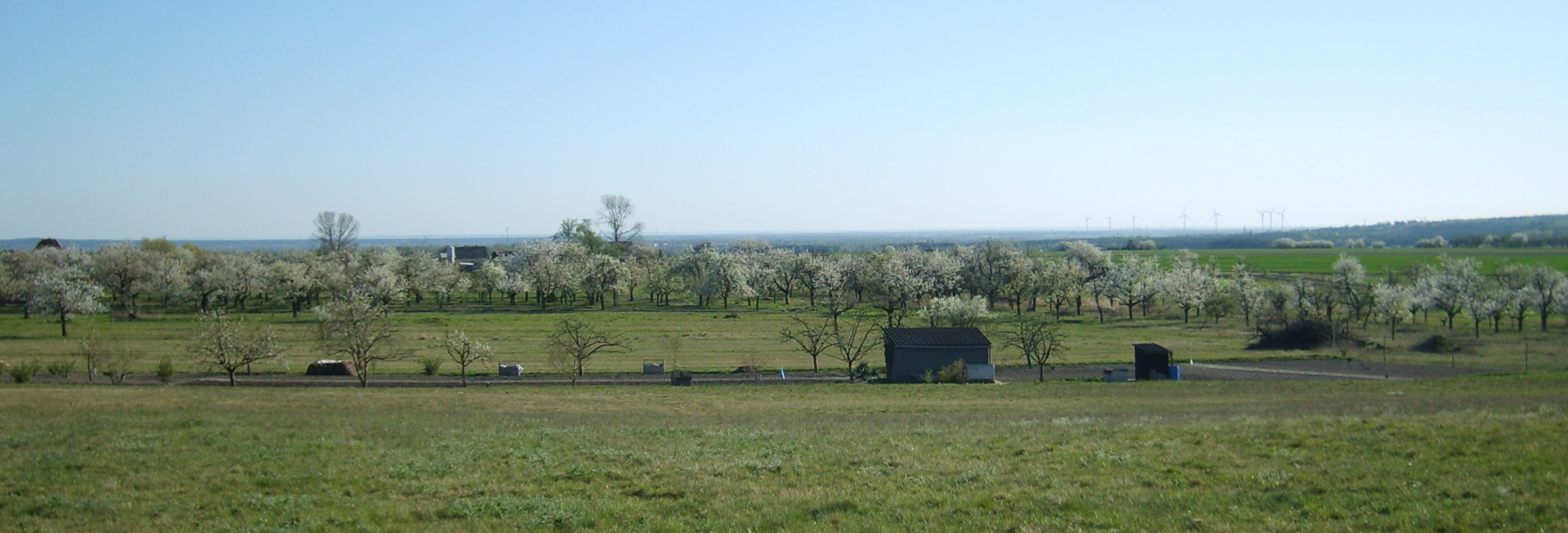
Meadows near Hohenleipisch

This sparsely inhabited area within the North European Plain (Northern Lowland) is characterised by extended pine forests, heathlands and meadows. In the north it is confined by the middle Spree River with Lake Schwielochsee and its eastern continuation across the Oder at Fürstenberg to Chlebowo. In the glacial valley between Lübben and Cottbus, the Spree River branches out into the Spreewald ("Spree Woods") riparian forest. Other rivers include the Berste and Oelse tributaries as well as the Schlaube and the Oder–Spree Canal opened in 1891.

In the east, the Bóbr river flows from Łagoda via Krzystkowice down to the historic town of Żary forms the border with the lands of Lower Silesia. In the west the course of the upper Dahme River down to Golßen separates it from the former Electoral Saxon lands of Saxe-Wittenberg. Between Lower and Upper Lusatia is a hill region called the Grenzwall (literally "border dike", although it is in fact a morainic ridge), the eastern continuation of the Fläming Heath. In the Middle Ages this area had dense forests, so it represented a major obstacle to civilian and military traffic. Today it is roughly congruent of the border between Brandenburg and the state of Saxony.

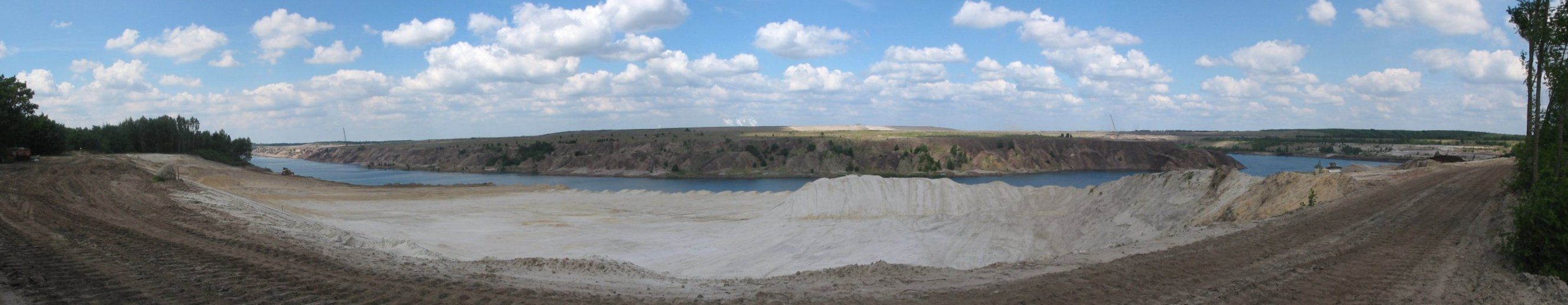
Recultivation and flooding of a former lignite mine north of Klinge, near Cottbus

In the course of much of the 19th and the entire 20th century, Lower Lusatia was shaped by the lignite (brown coal) industry and extensive open-pit mining, by which more than 100 of the region's villages—many of them within the Sorbian settlement area—were damaged or destroyed, especially by order of East German authorities. While this process is still going on, most notably around Jänschwalde Power Station, run by EPH, some now exhausted open-pit mines are being converted into artificial lakes, in the hope of attracting tourism, and the area is now referred to as the Lusatian Lake District (Lausitzer Seenland).

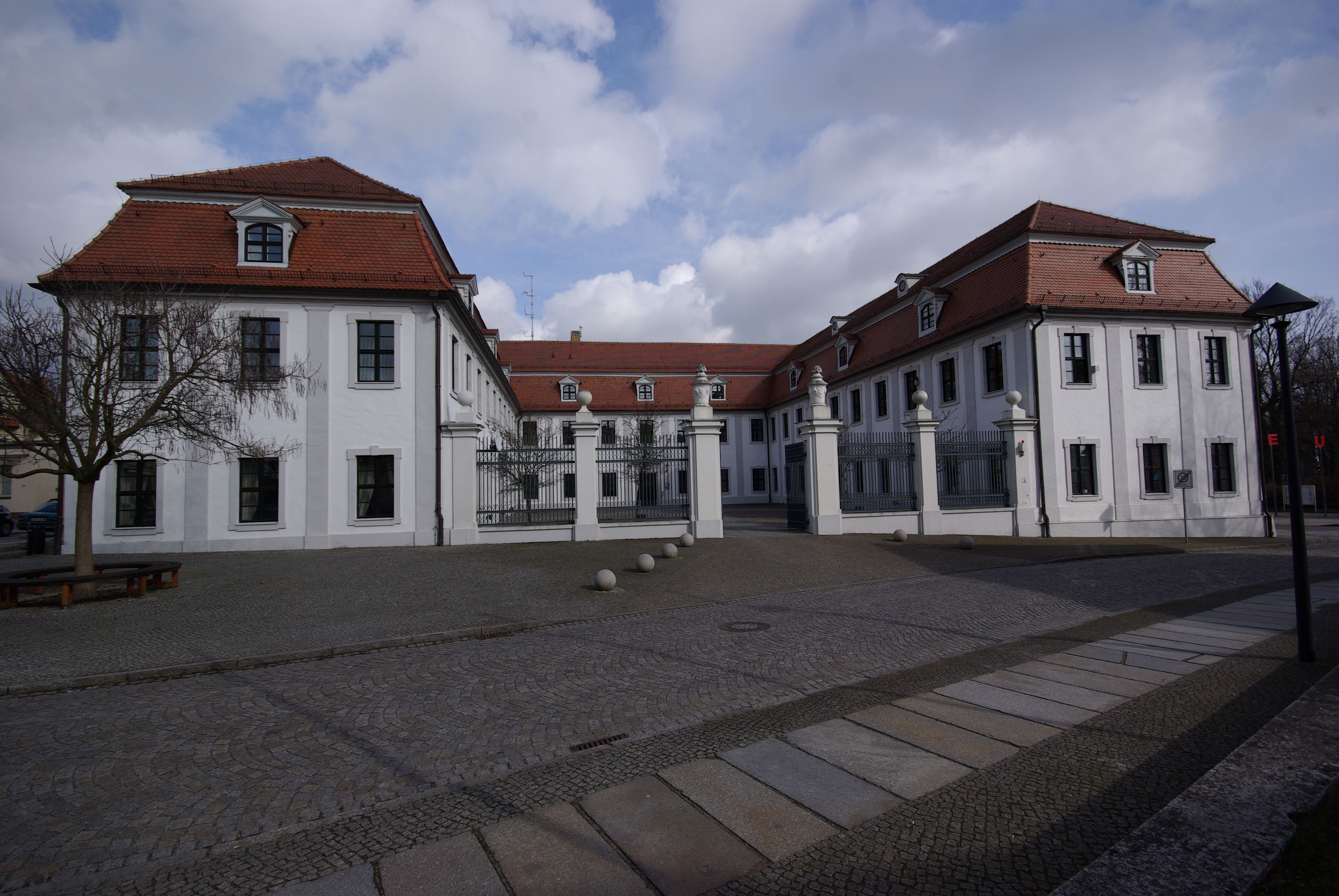
Lower Lusatian House of the Estates Assembly in Lübben

Today the area comprises the Brandenburg districts of Oberspreewald-Lausitz and Spree-Neiße with the unitary authority of Cottbus, as well as parts of Elbe-Elster, Dahme-Spreewald, and Oder-Spree. Important towns beside Cottbus and the historic capitals Lübben and Luckau include Calau, Doberlug-Kirchhain, Finsterwalde, Forst, Guben/Gubin, Lauchhammer, Lübbenau, Senftenberg, Spremberg, Vetschau, and Żary.

Since 1945, when a small part of Lusatia east of the Oder–Neisse line was incorporated into Poland, Żary has been touted as the capital of Polish Lusatia.

Map

== History ==
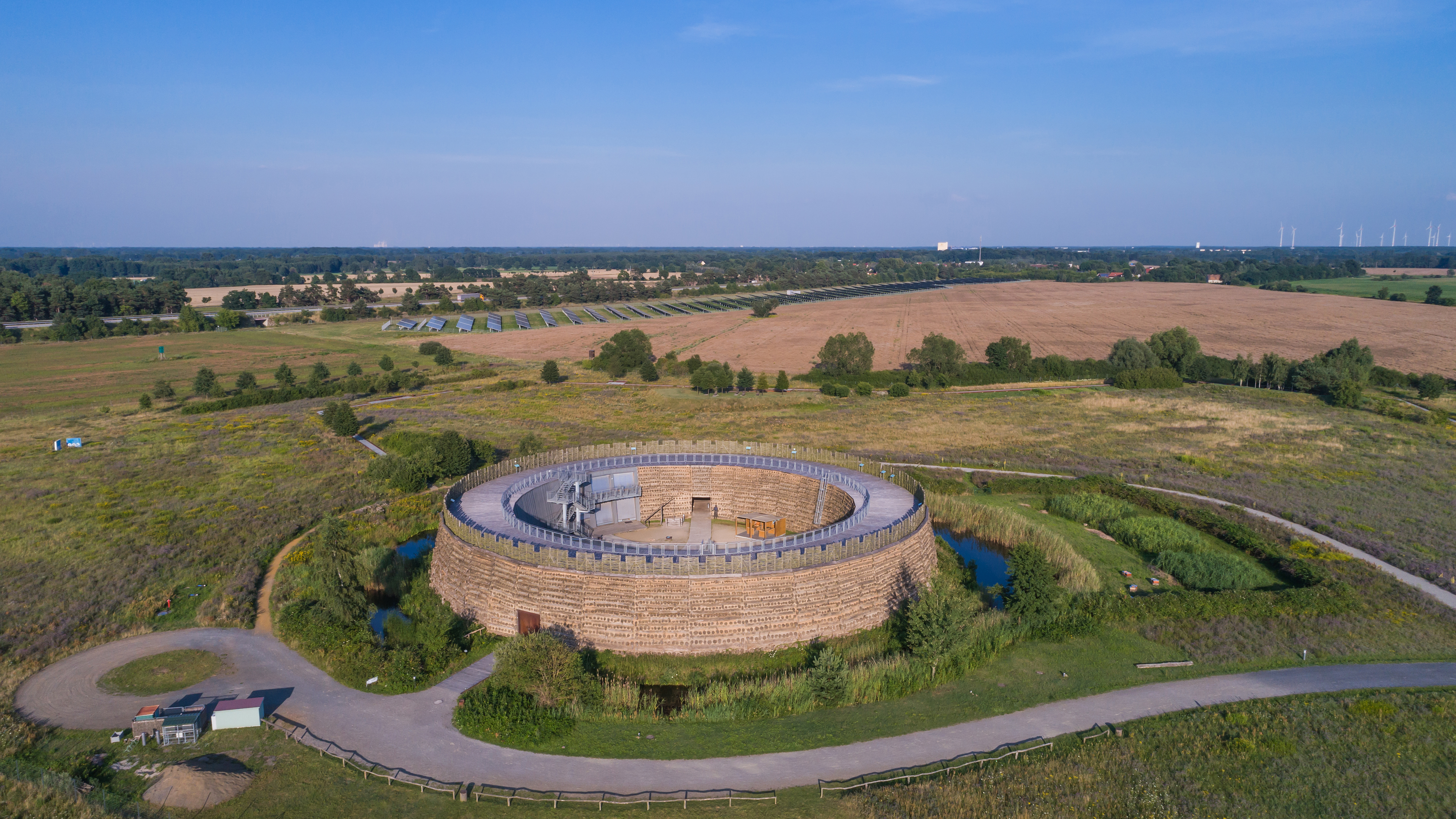
Reconstructed Lusatian stronghold of Raduš near Vetschau (Wětošow)

Up to the late medieval times, the region was known just as Lusatia (proper), gaining the Lower designation in the 15th century, when the neighboring region to the south (Land of Bautzen, previously the land of Slavic Milceni) became known as the Upper Lusatia. In early medieval sources, Lusatia (proper) was initially mentioned as land of Slavic Lusatians, and later as a march (frontier region). Thus in the second half of the 10th century, Widukind's Chronicle mentions Lusiki, while Thietmar's Chronicle from the beginning of the 11th century mentions Lusici or Lusizi, and also Luzici or Luidizi.

According to those sources, sometime during the early 960s, Slavic Lusatians were attacked by count Gero I, commander of the Saxon frontier regions, who forced them to subdue and pay tribute to German king and emperor Otto I (936–973). In 983, the Slavic revolt broke out in neighboring regions to the north, but German rule over Slavic Lusatians and their southern neighbors Milceni endured until 1002, when their regions were captured by the Polish duke Bolesław I the Brave, who took the town of Bautzen (Upper Sorbian: Budyšin) and all regions up to the river Elbe, and also captured the city of Meissen (Upper Sorbian: Mišno) with all territories up to White Elster river.

German count Gero II, a frontier commander (margrave) in the region, fell fighting Poles in 1015, and thus all lands of Slavic Lusatians and Milceni remained under Polish rule under the Treaty of Bautzen (1018), and further until 1031-1031, when they were recaptured by Germans and reincorporated into marches: Lusatians to the Saxon Ostmark, known from that time also as the March of Lusatia, while Milceni were reattached to the March of Meissen.

In 1136, Conrad the Great of the House of Wettin, margrave of Meissen, also received the March of Lusatia. In the early 13th century, Lusatia (proper) was either entirely or partly, reintegrated with Poland under Henry the Bearded. Later on, it was once again lost to the Wettin dynasty, who ruled it until in 1303 it was acquired by the Ascanian margraves of Brandenburg. For centuries, from as early as the Middle Ages, trade flourished, and several important trade routes ran through Lower Lusatia, connecting German states in the west, Poland in the east and Bohemia in the south.

In 1319, the southern portion of Lower Lusatia with the towns of Żary and Komorów Zły (now German: Senftenberg, Lower Sorbian: Zły Komorow) became part of the Duchy of Jawor, the southwesternmost duchy of fragmented Piast-ruled Poland. In the northern part, in 1319, Gubin was unsuccessfully besieged by King John of Bohemia, and eventually fell to the Dukes of Saxe-Wittenberg. In 1324, the northern part passed to the House of Wittelsbach. From 1364, entire Lower Lusatia was ruled by the Duchy of Jawor-Świdnica, and after the death of Duke Bolko II the Small it passed to the Kingdom of Bohemia (Czechia).

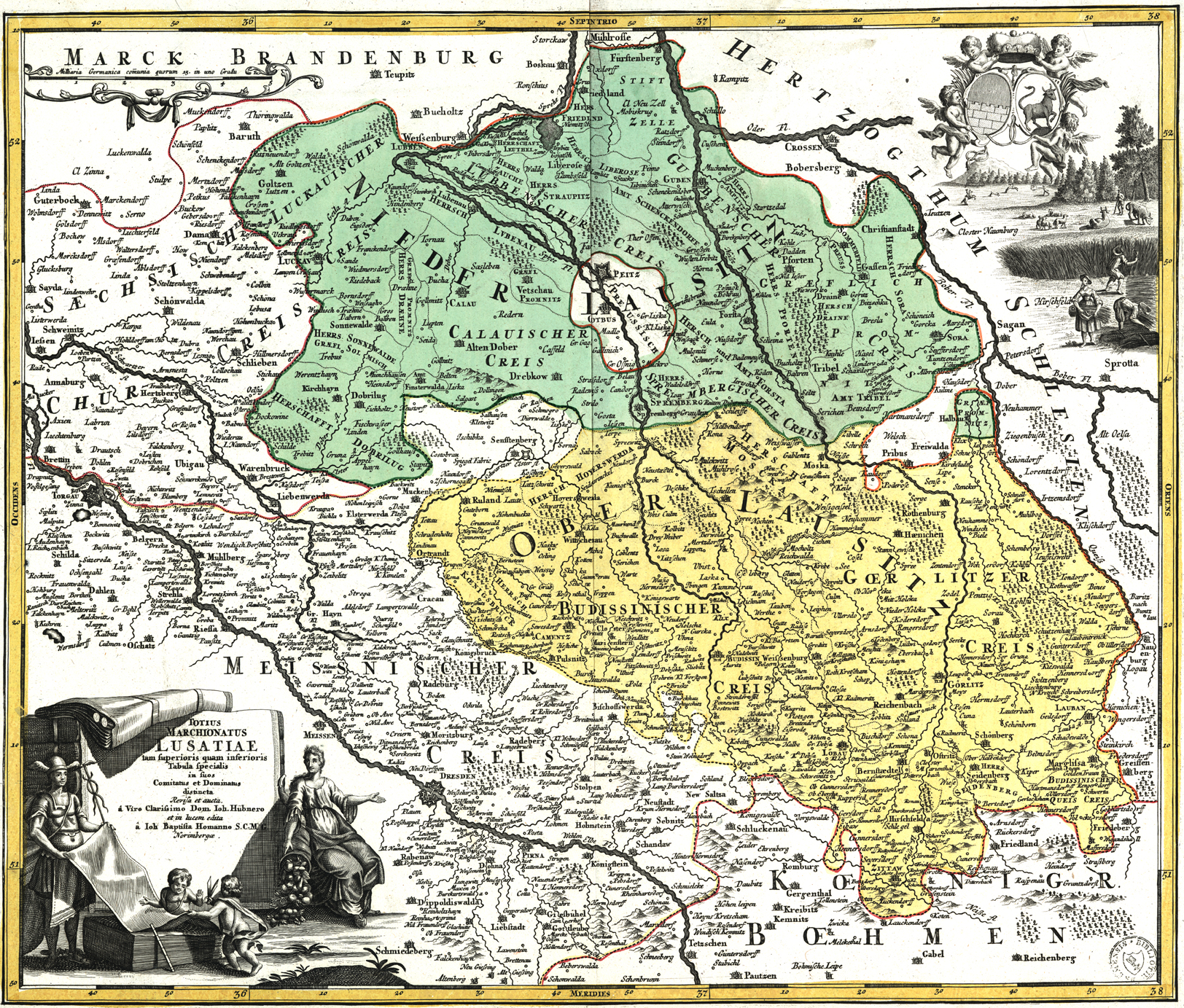
Lower (green) and Upper Lusatia (yellow), Johann Homann, early 18th century map.

In 1367 Elector Otto V sold it to Emperor Charles IV of Luxembourg who incorporated Lower Lusatia into the Bohemian Crown. Charles' father King John of Bohemia had already acquired the adjacent territory to the south around Bautzen and Görlitz, which became known as Upper Lusatia. The former Lordship of Cottbus was acquired by Brandenburg in 1455 and remained an exclave within the Bohemian kingdom.

Both Lusatias formed separate Bohemian crown lands under the rule of the Luxembourg, Jagiellon and—from 1526—Habsburg dynasties. In the course of the Reformation the vast majority of the population turned Protestant. The Bohemian era came to an end when Emperor Ferdinand II of Habsburg ceded the Lusatias to Elector John George I of Saxony under the 1635 Peace of Prague in return for his support in the Thirty Years' War; thus the lands returned to the House of Wettin.

One of the two main routes connecting Warsaw and Dresden ran through the region in the 18th century and Kings Augustus II the Strong and Augustus III of Poland often traveled the route. Numerous Polish dignitaries also traveled through Lower Lusatia on several occasions, and some Polish nobles owned estates in Lusatia. A distinct remnant of the region's ties to Poland are the 18th-century mileposts decorated with the coat of arms of the Polish–Lithuanian Commonwealth located in various towns in the region. Polish-Sorbian contacts increased in that period. With the Age of Enlightenment, the Sorbian national revival began and resistance to Germanization emerged.

As the Kingdom of Saxony had sided with Napoleon it had to cede Lower Lusatia to Prussia in the 1815 Congress of Vienna, whereafter the territory became part of the Province of Brandenburg and the Province of Saxony. One of the main escape routes for insurgents of the unsuccessful Polish November Uprising from partitioned Poland to the Great Emigration led through Lübben and Luckau.

In the interbellum, the Poles and Sorbs in Germany closely cooperated as part of the Association of National Minorities in Germany, established at the initiative of the Union of Poles in Germany in 1924. There were still notable Polish communities in Lower Lusatia, such as Klettwitz (Upper Sorbian: Klěśišća, Polish: Kletwice).

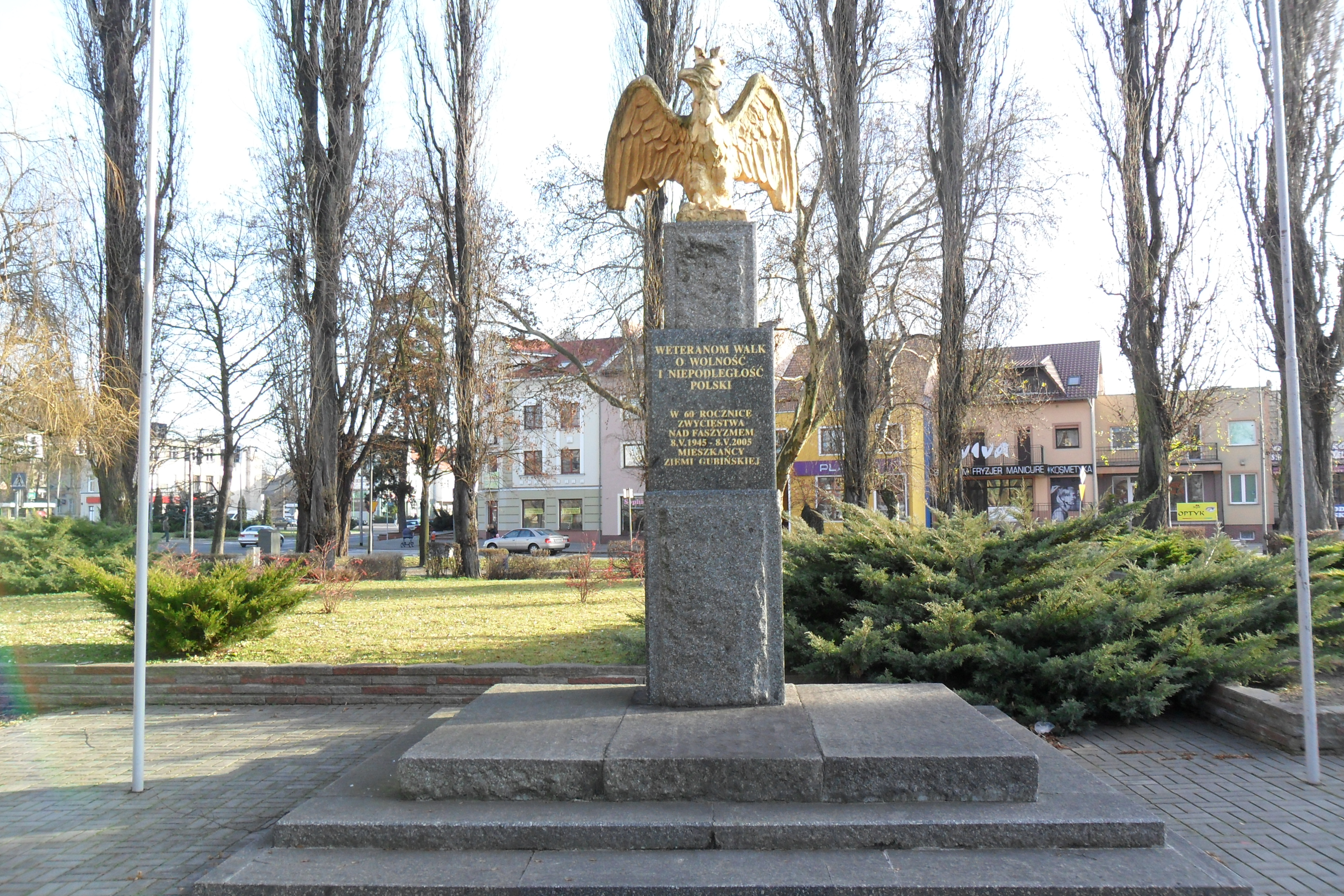
Monument to the veterans of the fights for Poland's freedom and independence in Gubin, Poland

During World War II, the Germans established and operated the Stalag III-B, Oflag III-C and Oflag 8 and prisoner-of-war camps for Polish, French, Belgian, Serbian, British, Australian, New Zealander, Soviet, American, Dutch and Italian POWs with several forced labour subcamps in the region, several Nazi prisons with multiple forced labour subcamps, including in Luckau and a prison solely for women in Cottbus, and several subcamps of the Gross-Rosen concentration camp, the prisoners of which included Jewish women and Polish, French, Soviet, Croatian and Czech men.

During the war, the Poles postulated that after the defeat of Germany, the Sorbs should be allowed free national development either within the borders of Poland or Czechoslovakia, or as an independent Sorbian state in alliance with Poland.

With the implementation of the Oder–Neisse line by the 1945 Potsdam Conference, the lands east of the Neisse river became again part of Poland, and the remaining German population was expelled by the Soviet-installed Communist authorities in accordance with the Potsdam Agreement, whereas the western part became part of also Communist East Germany.

== Coat of arms ==
The Lower Lusatian bull is first documented in 1363. In 1378, upon the death of Emperor Charles IV, it appeared in gules on a field argent (red on silver), similar to the coat of arms of Luckau, in which the bull has gold horns and hooves, and turns his head to look at the viewer. After over 600 years it is still used today as Lower Lusatia's coat of arms.

== Culture ==
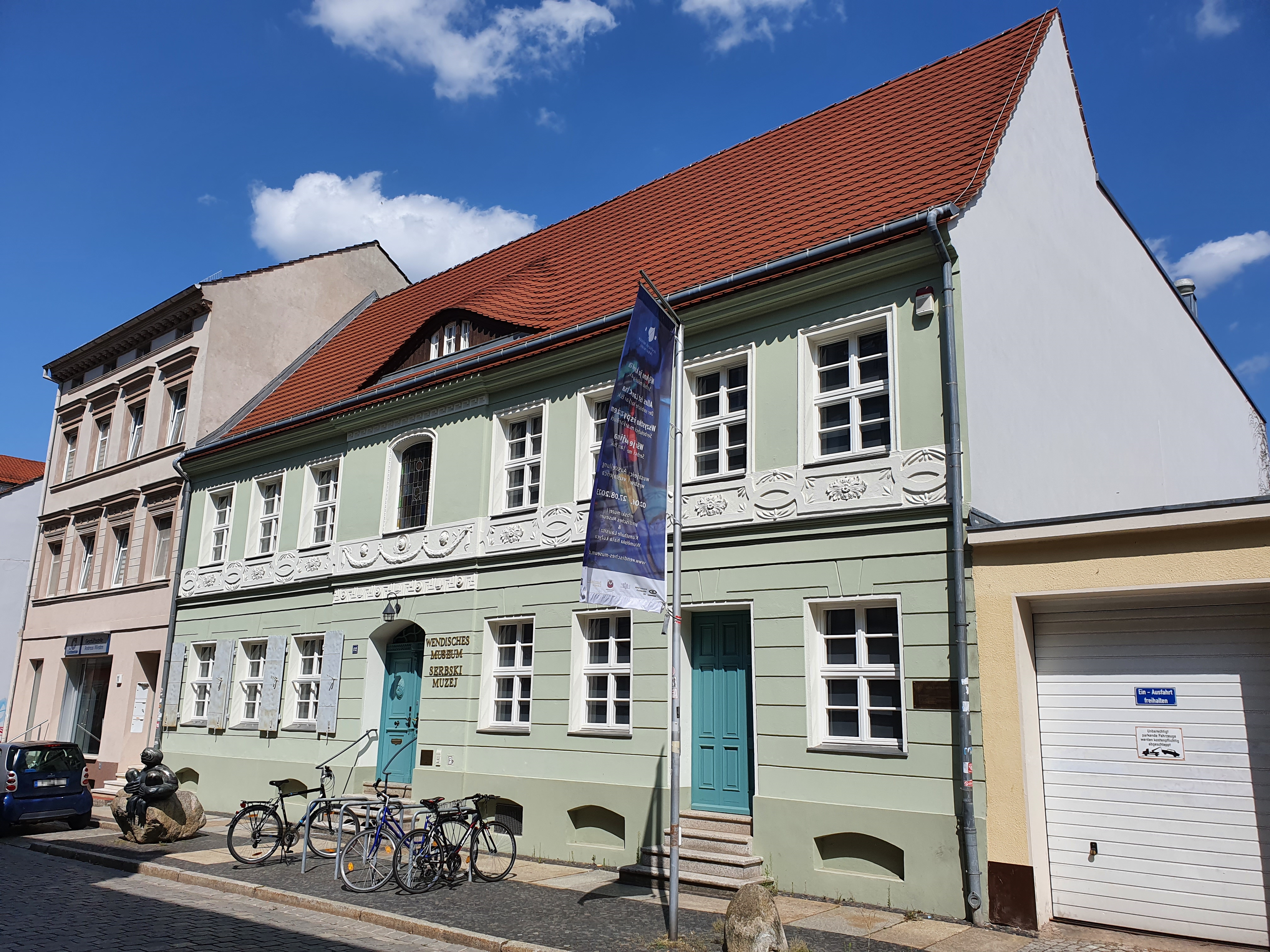
Serbski muzej Chóśebuz (Sorbian Museum in Cottbus)

Main museums dedicated to the history of the region include the Sorbian museum in Cottbus (Serbski muzej Chóśebuz) and the Muzeum Pogranicza Śląsko-Łużyckiego ("Museum of Silesian-Lusatian Borderland") in Żary.

=== Cuisine ===
Żary is the origin place of kiełbasa żarska, a local type of kiełbasa, whereas the Gubin area is the place of cultivation of the gubinka plum, both traditional foods officially protected by the Ministry of Agriculture and Rural Development of Poland.

== Nature reserves and parks ==
- Spreewald biosphere reserve
- Lusatian Lake District
- Lower Lusatian Heath Nature Park
- Lower Lusatian Ridge Nature Park

== See also ==
- List of regions of Saxony

== Sources ==
- Bachrach, David S. (2020). "The Eastern Campaigns of King Henry II of Germany, 1003–17". Journal of Medieval Military History. 18: 1–36. Archived from the original on 2026-05-18.
- Kmietowicz, Frank A. (1976). Ancient Slavs. Stevens Point: Worzalla Publishing Company.
- Lehmann, Rudolf, ed. (1968). Urkundeninventar zur Geschichte der Niederlausitz bis 1400. Köln: Böhlau Verlag.
- Pech, Edmund (2015). "Milzener, Lusizer und Glomaci-Daleminzer: Kontroversen zur frühen Geschichte der Sorben". LĚTOPIS. Zeitschrift für sorbische Sprache, Geschichte und Kultur: Časopis za rěč, stawizny a kulturu Łužiskich Serbow. 62 (2): 119–132. Archived from the original on 2026-02-19.
- Rotter, Ekkehart; Schneidmüller, Bernd, eds. (1981). Widukind von Corvey: Res gestae Saxonicae: Die Sachsengeschichte. Stuttgart: Reclam.
- Stieldorf, Andrea (2026) [2012]. Marken und Markgrafen: Studien zur Grenzsicherung durch die fränkisch-deutschen Herrscher (2nd ed.). Wiesbaden: Harrassowitz Verlag.
- Trillmich, Werner, ed. (1957). Thietmar von Merseburg: Chronik. Darmstadt: Wissenschaftliche Buchgesellschaf.
- Warner, David A., ed. (2001). Ottonian Germany: The Chronicon of Thietmar of Merseburg. Manchester and New York: Manchester University Press.
