= Ore Mountain Basin =

The Ore Mountain Basin or Erzgebirge Basin (German: Erzgebirgsbecken) is a natural region in the German federal state of Saxony, that is part of the Saxon Lowland. To the north it borders on the Mulde Loess Hills and to the south on several natural regions in the Saxon Highlands and Uplands.

The basin is a structural depression running from northeast to southwest in the Ore Mountain peneplain that is filled with Devonian and Carboniferous sediments. The main communications from the Ore Mountains follow the valleys downhill and are collected by a major routeway to the north that follows this furrow and passes through the cities of Zwickau and Chemnitz.

According to current categorisation the Upper Pleißeland (Obere Pleißeland), immediately to the east of the towns of Werdau and Crimmitschau, is also counted as part of the basin.

The Ore Mountain Basin is an important centre of population in Saxony and a historically important industrial region, not least because of the Zwickau Field which contained most of East Germany's very minor reserves of coal and included the biggest former hard coal mining region in Saxony.
