= Geochore =

Geochores (Greek γῆ gé "the earth" and χώρα chora "area") are relatively large landscape areas with similar – but owing to their size not fully uniform – characteristics. They therefore consist of a tapestry of smaller landscape units, which can be hierarchically grouped:

- Physiotopes or geotopes form the base unit (tope from the Greek, τόπος, "place"). These are objects whose features are assessed as homogenous and which cannot sensibly be subdivided into smaller landscapes. Their area depends on the distribution pattern of their features and on the purpose or aim of the classification, but in general they are between 0.1 and 5 hectares in area.
- Nanogeochores or nanochores are the simplest level of physiotopes.
  - Example: Ameisenberg near Oybin is part of the Oybin Rock Region (microgeochore)
- Microgeochores are small scale landscape units with an average area of 12 km^{2}. In terms of biotopes or woodland or agricultural land which is managed in a certain way, they form a tapestry of nanogeochores. They cover areas which are similar mainly in terms of their geological origins, rocks, topographical elevation or relief energy. They are a good example of the how geological and topographical history affects the resulting landscape structure.
  - Example: Hochwald Ridge and Oybin Rock Region
- Mesogeochores are simply formations and groups of microgeochores. Their association is based on similarities of climate, topography such as mountains, valleys and hills or associated features from the Pleistocene (ice age). They are oriented towards the management and relative size of the microgeochores of which they comprise.
  - Example: Zittau Mountains or Zittau Basin
- Macrogeochores or major landscapes - as natural region major units - are simply groupings of mesogeochores, whose cohesiveness is based e.g. on geological foundations, on climatic conditions or vegetation (e. g. hpnV). They are "regional" in size.
  - Example: Lusatian Mountains or Upper Lusatian Highlands.

== Literature ==
- Haase, G. and K. Mannsfeld (eds., 2002): Naturraumeinheiten, Landschaftsfunktionen und Leitbilder am Beispiel von Sachsen (= Forschungen zur Deutschen Landeskunde 250). - Flensburg. ISBN 3-88143-072-5
