= Dresden Basin =

River Valley in Germany

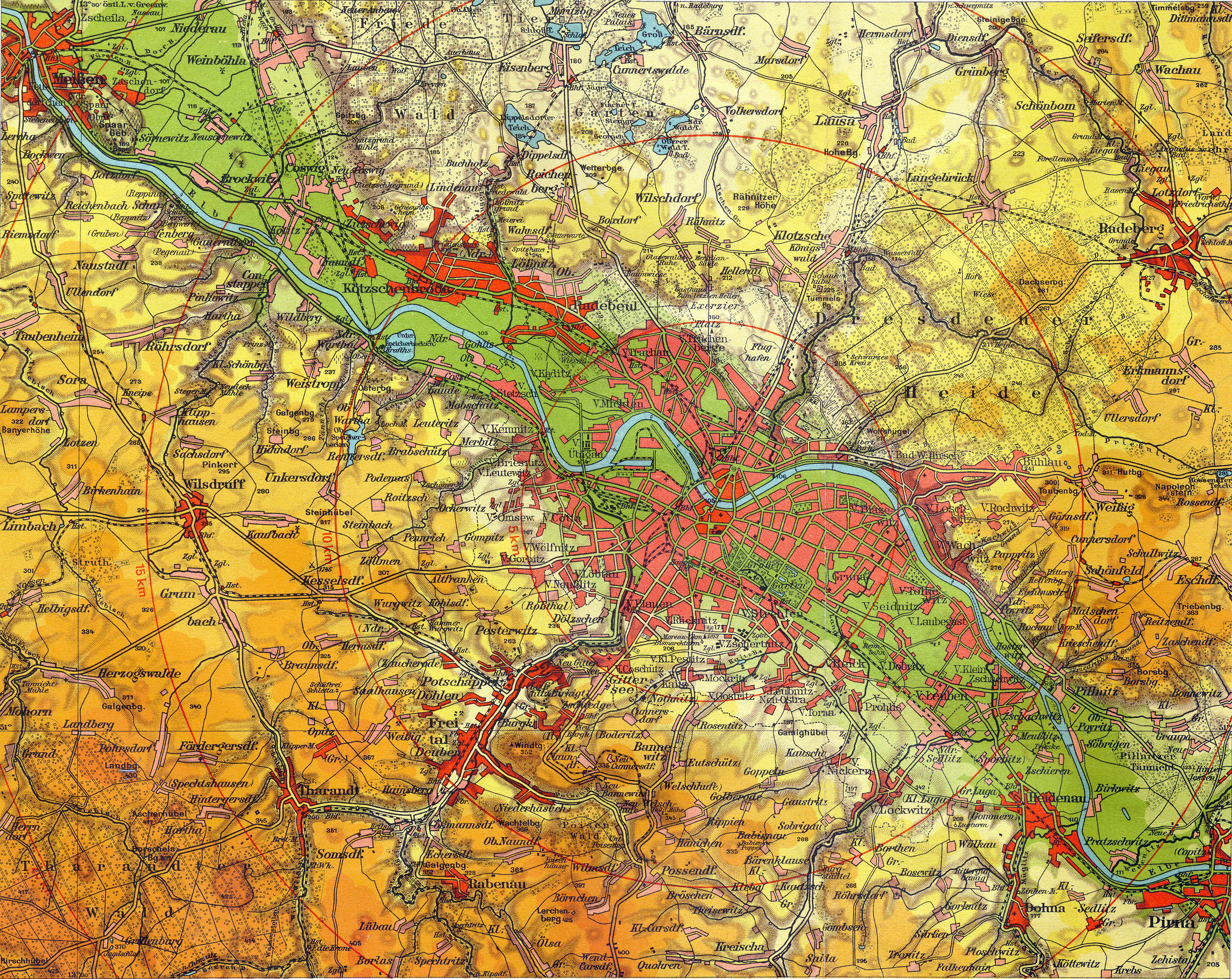
Dresden Basin about 1930

The Dresden Basin (German: (Dresdner) Elbtalkessel or Dresdner Elbtalweitung) is a roughly 45 km long and 10 km wide area of the Elbe Valley between the towns of Pirna and Meißen. The city of Dresden lies in the Dresden Basin.

== Geography ==
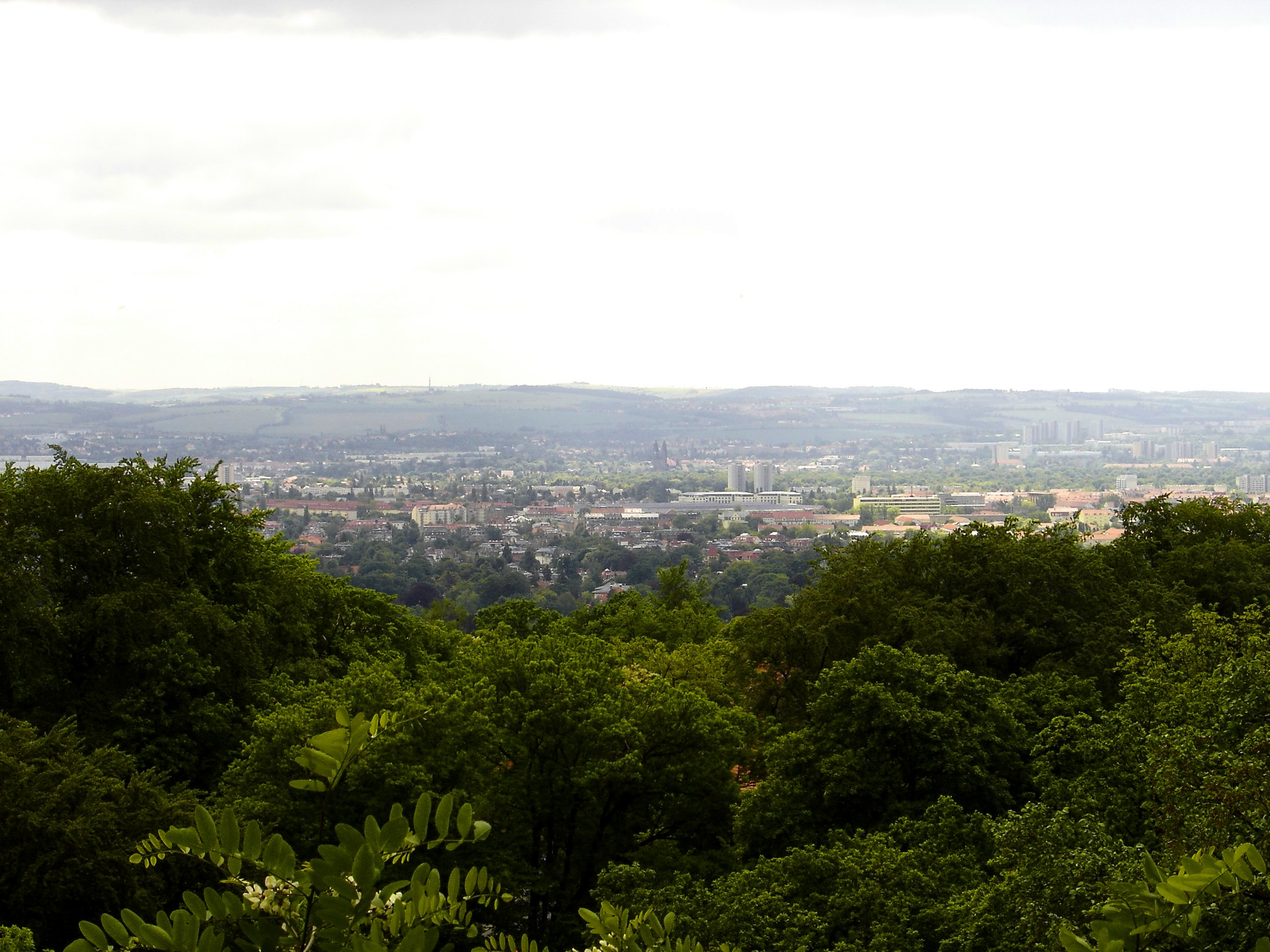
View from Mordgrund of the Dresden Heath over eastern parts of the city near the Altstadt

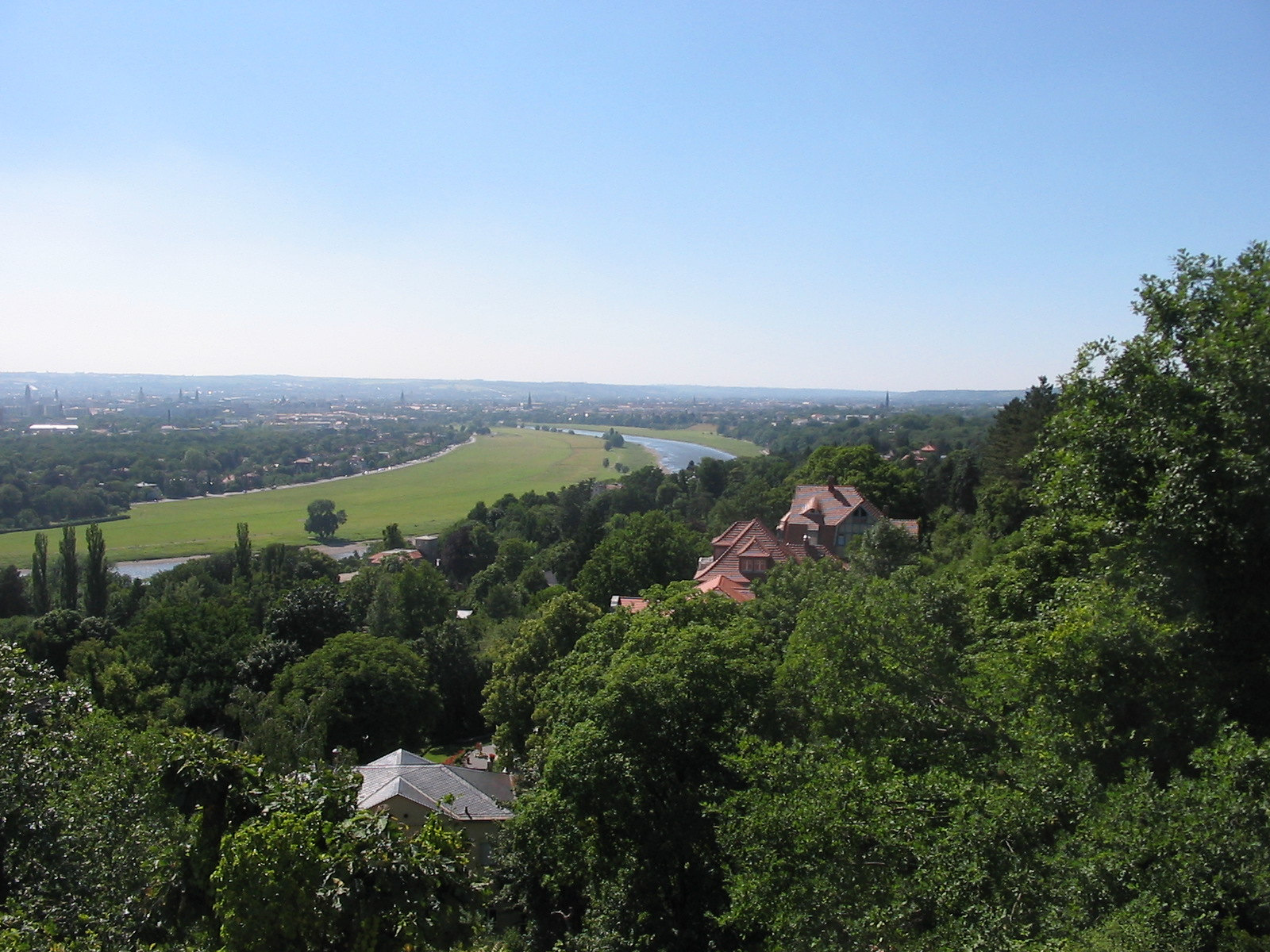
View of Dresden from Luisenhof on the northern slopes of the Elbe

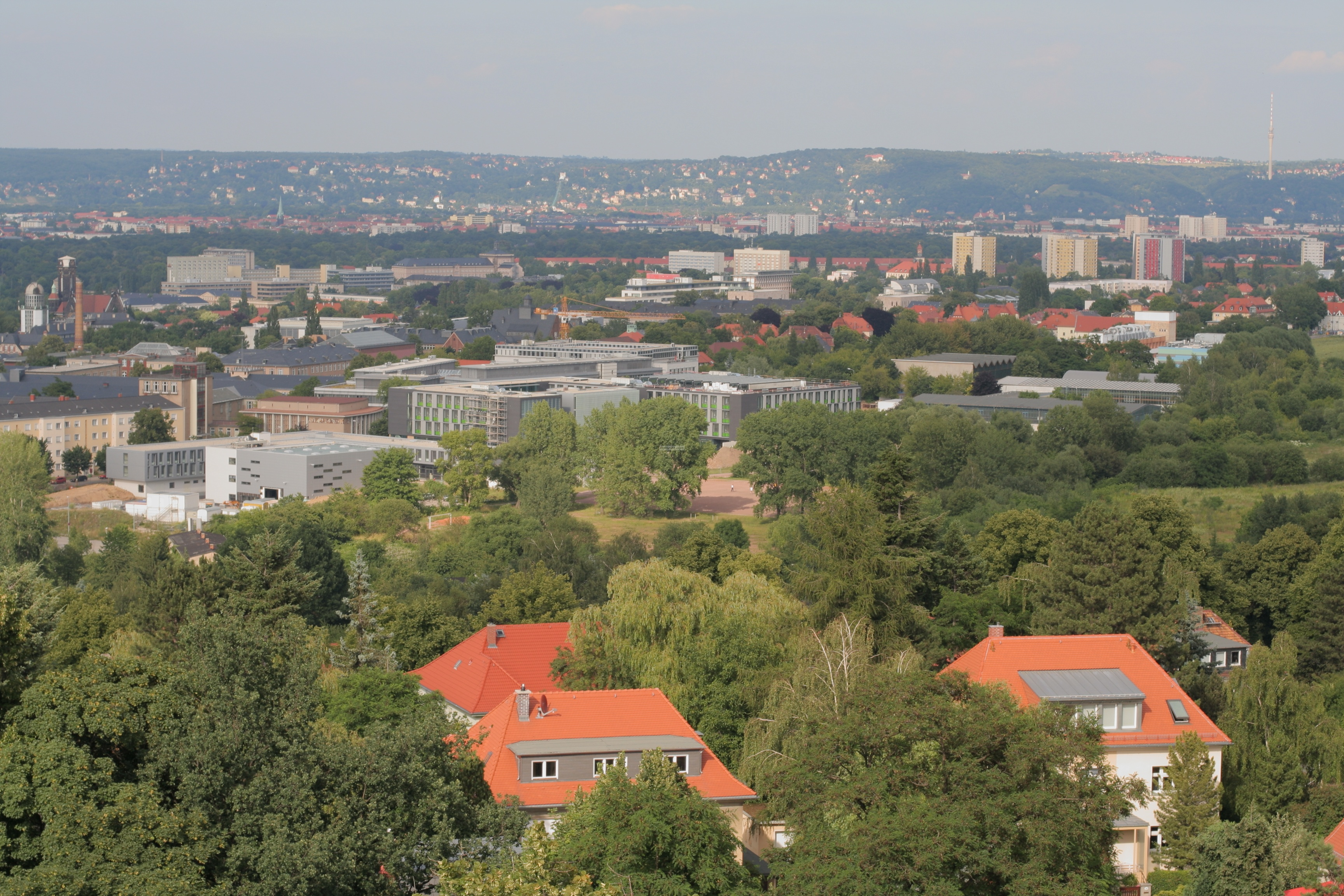
View from Fichteturm on the slopes of the city district of Plauen

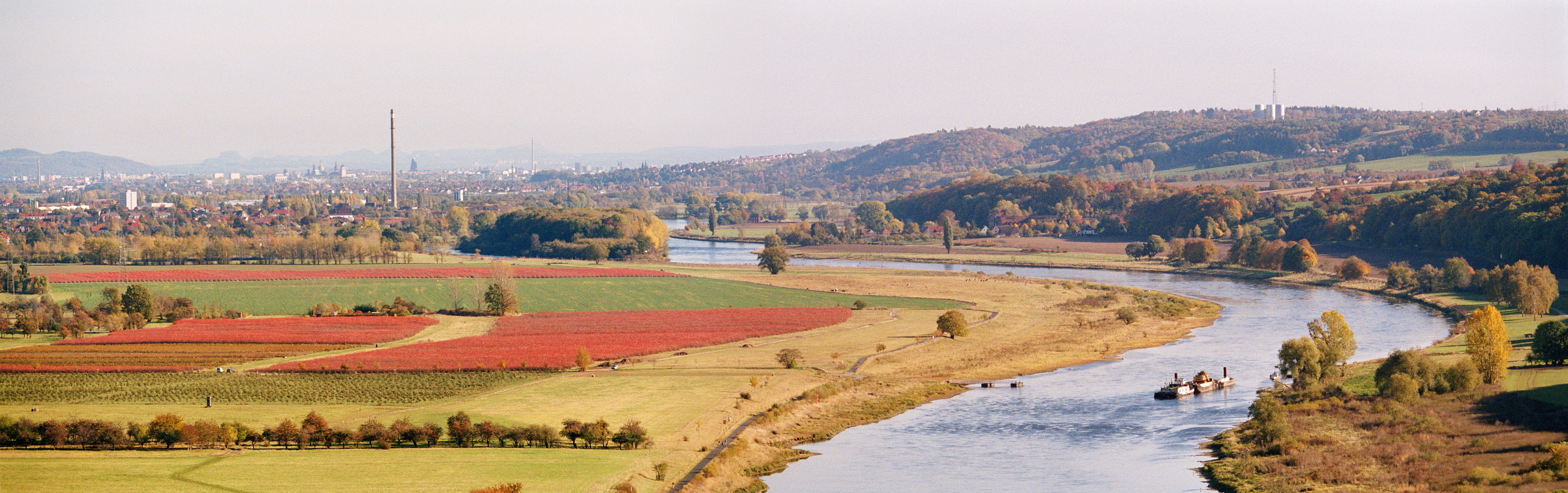
View of the Bosel near Meißen looking towards Dresden and Saxon Switzerland

The Dresden Basin is formed by the foothills and flanks of the Eastern Ore Mountains and western Lusatian Highlands and the northwestern slopes of Saxon Switzerland. Geologically it is a rift valley and its most important river, the Elbe flows through it in wide meanders. The region is climatically milder than the surrounding area, so that on the northern slopes of the hills vineyards may be cultivated (Saxon Wine Route). In addition, there is intensive fruit farming. The valley climate is significantly drier (average annual precipitation below 700 mm) and warmer (average air temperature 8.5 °C, in Dresden city centre 9.9 °C) than the surrounding hills. The region was settled early due to the fertile soils (loess) and the easy river crossings and achieved worldwide importance from a cultural and historical perspective. Today the Dresden conurbation almost entirely fills the basin.

Parts of the Dresden Basin near the Elbe (the Dresden Elbe Valley) were given World Heritage Site status between 2004 and 2009 by UNESCO due to their cultural and natural significance.

During the East German era, the Basin was jokingly referred to by its inhabitants as the Valley of the Clueless, because they were not able to receive West German television until the late 1980s, and then only patchily.

The most important towns and cities are (in downstream order):

- Pirna
- Heidenau
- Dresden
- Radebeul
- Coswig (Sachsen)
- Meißen

== Bibliography ==
- Dickinson, Robert E (1964). Germany: A regional and economic geography (2nd ed.). London: Methuen. ASIN B000IOFSEQ.
- Elkins, T H (1972). Germany (3rd ed.). London: Chatto & Windus, 1972. ASIN B0011Z9KJA.

== See also ==
- List of regions of Saxony
- Natural regions of Germany
- Saxony, meander
