= Muskau Heath =

Forest in Germany

Coordinates: 51.459569°N 14.799271°E

The Muskau Heath (German: Muskauer Heide, Upper Sorbian: Mužakowska hola), is a natural region in Saxony that lies south of the town of Bad Muskau. It has an area of 400 square kilometres.

== Description ==
It is a gently rolling terraced region, much of it underlain by Miocene brown coal seams. The height of the terrain varies between 120 and 170 metres above sea level. The dunes, which were created by wind action about 10,000 years ago during the postglacial period of the Weichselian Ice Age, form the largest area of inland dunes in Germany. Between Nochten and Rietschen they extend for about 30-40 kilometres. These dunes were oriented westwards by the prevailing west winds. Their southernmost point forms a sharp boundary with the natural region of the Upper Lusatian Heath and Pond Landscape. The uninitiated often do not recognise the dunes as such because of their vegetation.

In general, the region is dominated by dry and nutrient-poor sandy areas that are a long way above the groundwater table. There are gley, bog and anmoor or half-bog soils in the basins of the lowlands.

== Climate ==
The climate of the Muskau Heath is weakly continental, with warm dry summers and long periods of fine weather, and cold winters. At 650 mm, the annual precipitation is relatively high compared with the dry regions of northwest Saxony, but the water quickly seeps through the sands and the risk of forest fires in this area is relatively high.

== Flora ==
The potential natural vegetation consists of birch and oak and pine forests. Today, forestry has resulted in pine monocultures in many areas. Larger parts of the Muskau Heath were erased by excavations for the Nochten open-cast mine, including ecologically very valuable areas such as the old-growth forest of Weißwasser and the Trebendorf Wildlife Park in the northwestern part.

== Fauna ==
The heath is home to red deer, roe deer, fallow deer, wild boar and, more recently, wolves migrating from Poland. The numerous ponds offer habitats to water birds as well as otters, beavers, white-tailed eagles and ospreys.

== Ranges ==
The only military firing range in Saxony is located on Muskau Heath.
