= Zwickauer Land =

- District
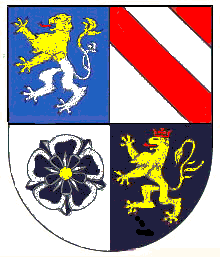
- Coat of arms

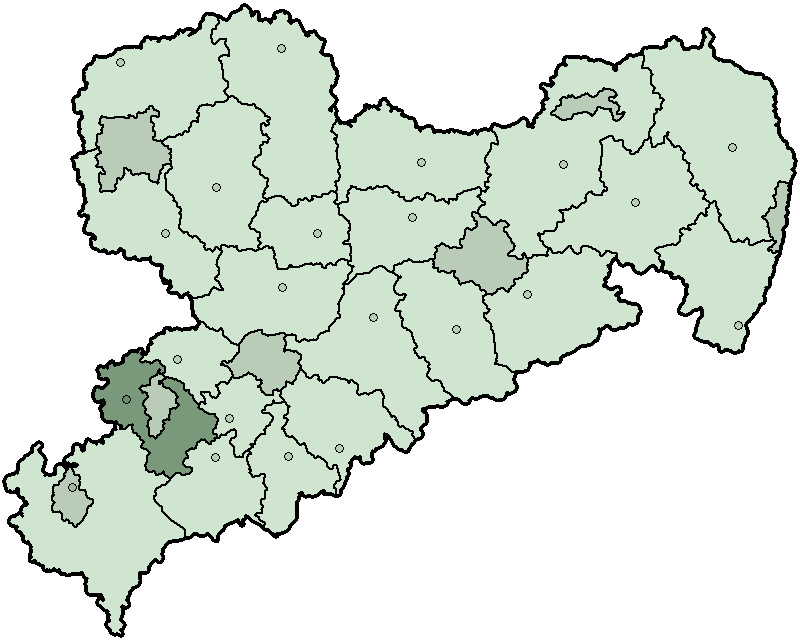
- Country: Germany
- State: Saxony
- Adm. region: Chemnitz
- Disbanded: 2008-08-01
- Capital: Werdau

Area
  - Total: 511.09 km^{2} (197.33 sq mi)

Population (2001)
  - Total: 133,741
  - Density: 260/km^{2} (680/sq mi)
- Time zone: UTC+01:00 (CET)
  - Summer (DST): UTC+02:00 (CEST)
- Vehicle registration: Z
- Website: www.zwickauerland.de

Zwickauer Land is a former Kreis (district) in the south-west of Saxony, Germany. Neighboring districts were (from north-east clockwise) Chemnitzer Land, Stollberg, Aue-Schwarzenberg, Vogtlandkreis, and the districts Greiz and Altenburger Land in Thuringia. The district-free city of Zwickau was located in the center of the district and nearly completely surrounded by it.

== History ==
In early days Zwickau was the starting point for the settlement of a whole region. The first official document of the ”territorim zwickaw” dates from May 1, 1118. The settlement by German farmers took mainly place in the second half of the 12th century. At the same time castles were built. A special area was administered by a bailiff, as a representative of the governor. The Wettiners were the most powerful rulers in Saxony in the 13th century. In the region of Zwickau the sovereign of Schönburg and Wildenfels were given the rule over their comparatively small territories.

With the division of the Saxon country the administrative structures became unclear in Leipzig in 1485. The borderline between albertinian and ernestinian possession was tangent to the Zwickauer city boundary. With the development of the Saxon state uniformed administrative structures began gradually to develop. In the Middle Ages the Saxon area was divided into governor's residence, apart from the central administration. Out of this new jobs developed in the 15th century. The “administrators” (Amtsmann) practised the jurisdiction, and were responsible for the military quantity and public security.

The administrators came from the rural aristocracy. The noble administrator was promoted to the “chief administrator” (Amtshauptmann) during the following century, who usually supervised two to four offices. At the same time the “Kursaxon” territory was divided into districts for a better administration. The district was headed by a “county administrator” (Kreishauptmann or Oberhauptmann).

During the whole Middle Ages and afterwards – even until our century - the city Zwickau with their surrounding area was regarded as a unit, concerning administrative matters.

Ongoing conflicts, for example the Thirty Years' War and the Seven Years' War, influenced the administration negatively.

Zwickau was the seat of the chief administrator. Since 1828, additionally the county administrators ruled from there the Southwest and the middle “Erzgebirge” and the suburbs.

Only in 1835, became the regional administration a new structure. The county administrators were replaced by “district directions” (Kreisdirektion) in Dresden, Leipzig, Bautzen and Zwickau. The chief administrators in Zwickau, Chemnitz, Wolkenstein, Plauen and in the territory of the sovereign of Schönburg belonged to the district direction Zwickau.

The following offices were headed by the chief administrator in Zwickau: Kirchberg, Werdau, Schwarzenberg, Eibenstock and of course Zwickau. Hartenstein, Lichtenstein, Stein, Waldenburg and Glauchau were controlled by the sovereign of Schönburg.

In 1856 an important step toward modern administration was done with the establishment of new administration offices, the “offices of court” (Gerichtsamt). Thereby the old office organization could be overcome.

In 1873 justice and administration were separated. Now the offices of court were only responsible for the law. The “administration crews” (Amtshauptmannschaft) were responsible for the administration. There were four “county administration crews” (Kreishauptmannschaften), which were created as organs of the Saxon government. The county administration crew of Zwickau consisted of the administration crews in Annaberg, Auerbach, Chemnitz, Flöha, Marienberg, Oelsnitz, Plauen, Schwarzenberg and Zwickau.

In 1919 a branch office of Zwickau was opened in Werdau. It became an independent office in 1920, but in 1933 it was affiliated to Zwickau again.

The rural constitution of 1946 as well as the Saxon constitution of 1947 established democratic values in Saxony again, like they had existed before the beginning of the Third Reich.

Now part of the German Democratic Republic (East Germany), the federal state of Saxony was liquidated as part of the administration reforms implemented from July 23, 1952. At the same time the former district Zwickau was divided into the districts Werdau and Zwickau. The area of the district Zwickau received a strong reduction. A considerable part turned into the district Werdau; furthermore, parts of the Zwickauer area were added to the district of Reichenbach. On the other hand the "Mülsengrund" was extracted from the district Glauchau and was affiliated to the district Zwickau.

With the dramatic events in autumn 1989, the Berlin Wall came down. The German Democratic Republic ceased to exist as Germany was re-united. With Saxon parliamentary elections on October 14, 1990, the federal state of Saxony was re-established. On May 6, 1990 local elections took place. At the constituent meeting of district assembly Christian Otto was elected head of the administration of the district Zwickau. In the district Werdau the citizens elected Georg Hamburg to head of the administration.

With the district reform on August 1, 1994, the rural district “Zwickauer Land” was created, seated in Werdau. With the termination of the municipality regional reorganization on January 1, 1999, the district changed its geographical face again. The places Cainsdorf, Mosel, Oberrothenbach and Schlunzig were affiliated to Zwickau against the will of the people living there.

In August 2008, as a part of the district reform in Saxony, the districts of Zwickauer Land, Chemnitzer Land and the urban district Zwickau were merged into the new district Zwickau.

== Geography ==
The district is located in the Ore Mountains, with the main river s being the Zwickauer Mulde and the Pleiße.

== Towns and municipalities ==
Cities
1. Crimmitschau
2. Hartenstein
3. Kirchberg
4. Werdau
5. Wildenfels
6. Wilkau-Haßlau
Municipalities
1. Crinitzberg
2. Dennheritz
3. Fraureuth
4. Hartmannsdorf bei Kirchberg
5. Hirschfeld
6. Langenbernsdorf
7. Langenweißbach
8. Lichtentanne
9. Mülsen
10. Neukirchen
11. Reinsdorf
