= Zwickau (electoral district) =

Federal electoral district of Germany

Coordinates: 50.732017°N 12.483673°E

164 Zwickau
- Electoral district for the Bundestag
- Zwickau in 2025
- State: Saxony
- Population: 243,000 (2019)
- Electorate: 197,831 (2021)
- Major settlements: Zwickau; Glauchau; Werdau
- Area: 755.1 km^{2}

Current electoral district
- Created: 1990
- Party: AfD
- Member: Matthias Moosdorf
- Elected: 2021, 2025

Zwickau is an electoral constituency (German: Wahlkreis) represented in the Bundestag. It elects one member via first-past-the-post voting. Under the current constituency numbering system, it is designated as constituency 164. It is located in southwestern Saxony, comprising most of the Zwickau district.

Zwickau was created for the inaugural 1990 federal election after German reunification. Since 2021, it has been represented by Matthias Moosdorf of Alternative for Germany (AfD).

== Geography ==
Zwickau is located in southwestern Saxony. As of the 2021 federal election, it comprises the entirety of the Zwickau district excluding the municipalities of Callenberg, Gersdorf, Hohenstein-Ernstthal, and Oberlungwitz and the Verwaltungsgemeinschaften of Limbach-Oberfrohna and Rund um den Auersberg.

== History ==
Zwickau was created after German reunification in 1990, then known as Zwickau – Werdau. In the 2002 and 2005 elections, it was named Zwickauer Land – Zwickau. It acquired its current name in the 2009 election. In the 1990 through 1998 elections, it was constituency 327 in the numbering system. In the 2002 and 2005 elections, it was number 167. In the 2009 election, it was number 166. In the 2013 through 2021 elections, it was number 165. From the 2025 election, it has been number 164.

Originally, the constituency comprised the independent city of Zwickau, the Landkreis Zwickau district, and the Werdau district. In the 2002 and 2005 elections, it comprised the independent city of Zwickau and the Zwickauer Land district. It acquired its current borders in the 2009 election.

Election	No.	Name	Borders
1990	327	Zwickau – Werdau	Zwickau city; Landkreis Zwickau district; Werdau district
1994	327	Zwickau – Werdau	Zwickau city; Landkreis Zwickau district; Werdau district
1998	327	Zwickau – Werdau	Zwickau city; Landkreis Zwickau district; Werdau district
2002	167	Zwickauer Land – Zwickau	Zwickau city; Zwickauer Land district
2005	167	Zwickauer Land – Zwickau	Zwickau city; Zwickauer Land district
2009	166	Zwickau	Zwickau district (only Callenberg, Gersdorf, Hohenstein-Ernstthal, and Oberlungwitz municipalities and Limbach-Oberfrohna and Rund um den Auersberg Verwaltungsgemeinschaften)
2013	165	Zwickau	Zwickau district (only Callenberg, Gersdorf, Hohenstein-Ernstthal, and Oberlungwitz municipalities and Limbach-Oberfrohna and Rund um den Auersberg Verwaltungsgemeinschaften)
2017	165	Zwickau	Zwickau district (only Callenberg, Gersdorf, Hohenstein-Ernstthal, and Oberlungwitz municipalities and Limbach-Oberfrohna and Rund um den Auersberg Verwaltungsgemeinschaften)
2021	165	Zwickau	Zwickau district (only Callenberg, Gersdorf, Hohenstein-Ernstthal, and Oberlungwitz municipalities and Limbach-Oberfrohna and Rund um den Auersberg Verwaltungsgemeinschaften)
2025	164	Zwickau	Zwickau district (only Callenberg, Gersdorf, Hohenstein-Ernstthal, and Oberlungwitz municipalities and Limbach-Oberfrohna and Rund um den Auersberg Verwaltungsgemeinschaften)

== Members ==
The constituency was first represented by Michael Luther of the Christian Democratic Union (CDU) from 1990 to 2013. He was succeeded by Carsten Körber in 2013. Michael Moosdorf won the constituency for the Alternative for Germany (AfD) in 2021.

Election	Member	Party	%
1990	Michael Luther	CDU	52.2
1994	Michael Luther	CDU	49.5
1998	Michael Luther	CDU	34.5
2002	Michael Luther	CDU	39.4
2005	Michael Luther	CDU	34.6
2009	Michael Luther	CDU	38.8
2013	Carsten Körber	CDU	44.6
2017	Carsten Körber	CDU	33.7
2021	Matthias Moosdorf	AfD	25.6
2025	Matthias Moosdorf	AfD	39.9

== Election results ==
=== 2025 election ===
Federal election (2025): Zwickau
Notes:	Blue background denotes the winner of the electorate vote. Pink background denotes a candidate elected from their party list. Yellow background denotes an electorate win by a list member, or other incumbent. A ✓ or ✗ denotes status of any incumbent, win or lose respectively.						
Party	Candidate	Votes	%	±%	Party votes	%	±%
AfD	✓ Matthias Moosdorf	59,722	39.9	▲14.4	60,791	40.6	▲15.4
CDU	Carsten Körber	35,428	23.7	▲2.5	31,806	21.2	▲2.7
SPD	Jens Juraschka	14,837	9.9	▼6.7	13,376	8.9	▼12.2
BSW	Heiko Döhler	13,507	9.0	New	15,258	10.2	New
Left	Patrick Leonhardt	11,212	7.5	▼8.1	12,799	8.5	▼0.8
FW	Anselm Meyer	4,712	3.1	▼1.1	2,568	1.7	▼1.0
FDP	Nico Tippelt	4,356	2.9	▼6.7	4,571	3.0	▼7.6
Greens	Manuel Schramm	3,485	2.3	▼1.8	4,910	3.3	▼1.6
Tierschutzpartei					1,764	1.2	▼0.9
PARTEI	Désirée Engel	1,773	1.2	New	831	0.6	▼0.5
Volt					498	0.3	▲0.2
BD	Susan Heinrich	458	0.3	New	369	0.2	New
Pirates					159	0.1	▼0.2
Humanists					88	0.1	0.0
MLPD	Dagmar Kolkmann-Lutz	145	0.1	New	81	0.1	0.0
Informal votes		1,202			968		
Total valid votes		149,635			149,869		
Turnout		150,837	79.6	▲5.2			
AfD hold	Majority	24,294	16.2	▲11.8			

=== 2021 election ===
Federal election (2021): Zwickau
Notes:	Blue background denotes the winner of the electorate vote. Pink background denotes a candidate elected from their party list. Yellow background denotes an electorate win by a list member, or other incumbent. A ✓ or ✗ denotes status of any incumbent, win or lose respectively.						
Party	Candidate	Votes	%	±%	Party votes	%	±%
AfD	Matthias Moosdorf	37,135	25.6		36,601	25.1	▼1.0
CDU	✗ Carsten Körber	30,798	21.2	▼12.5	27,024	18.6	▼11.7
SPD	Gundula Schubert	24,094	16.6	▲3.9	30,718	21.1	▲10.3
Left	Sabine Zimmermann	22,583	15.5	▼10.2	13,629	9.4	▼7.2
FDP	Nico Tippelt	13,991	9.6	▼3.7	15,431	10.6	▲3.0
FW	Christiane Drechsel	6,105	4.2		4,004	2.8	▲1.6
Greens	Wolfgang Wetzel	5,988	4.1	▼0.4	7,134	4.9	▲2.0
Tierschutzpartei					3,093	2.1	▲0.7
dieBasis	Christoph Heinritz‑Bechtel	3,975	2.7		2,720	1.9	
PARTEI					1,483	1.0	▲0.1
Bündnis C					679	0.5	
Gesundheitsforschung					579	0.4	
Pirates					463	0.3	0.0
The III. Path					418	0.3	
NPD					400	0.3	▼0.6
ÖDP	Daniel Micklisch	474	0.3		310	0.2	0.0
Team Todenhöfer					244	0.2	
Volt					191	0.1	
Independent	Thomas Krajak	145	0.1				
Humanists					133	0.1	
V-Partei3					104	0.1	▼0.1
DKP					96	0.1	
MLPD					92	0.1	▼0.1
Informal votes		1,854			1,596		
Total valid votes		145,288			145,546		
Turnout		147,142	74.4	▲1.7			
AfD gain from CDU	Majority	6,337	4.4				

=== 2017 election ===
Federal election (2017): Zwickau
Notes:	Blue background denotes the winner of the electorate vote. Pink background denotes a candidate elected from their party list. Yellow background denotes an electorate win by a list member, or other incumbent. A ✓ or ✗ denotes status of any incumbent, win or lose respectively.						
Party	Candidate	Votes	%	±%	Party votes	%	±%
CDU	✓ Carsten Körber	48,347	33.7	▼10.8	45,106	30.3	▼14.1
AfD					38,964	26.2	▲20.1
Left	Sabine Zimmermann	36,881	25.7	▲1.1	24,665	16.6	▼4.7
FDP	Jürgen Martens	19,181	13.4	▲10.6	11,253	7.6	▲4.9
SPD	Mario Pecher	18,219	12.7	▼3.1	16,131	10.8	▼4.0
Independent	Heiko Richter	12,622	8.8				
Greens	Wolfgang Wetzel (Note: Wetzel entered the Bundestag on the Greens list after the resignation of Stephan Kühn in October 2020.)	6,513	4.5	▲1.6	4,327	2.9	▼0.3
Tierschutzpartei					2,162	1.5	
FW					1,674	1.1	▼0.7
Independent	Helmut Zagermann	1,617	1.1				
PARTEI					1,408	0.9	
NPD					1,302	0.9	▼2.3
Pirates					463	0.3	▼1.5
BGE					326	0.2	
ÖDP					299	0.2	
DiB					230	0.2	
V-Partei³					212	0.1	
MLPD					202	0.1	0.0
BüSo					105	0.1	▼0.2
Informal votes		7,570			2,121		
Total valid votes		143,380			148,829		
Turnout		150,950	72.7	▲4.6			
CDU hold	Majority	11,466	8.0	▼12.0			

=== 2013 election ===
Federal election (2013): Zwickau
Notes:	Blue background denotes the winner of the electorate vote. Pink background denotes a candidate elected from their party list. Yellow background denotes an electorate win by a list member, or other incumbent. A ✓ or ✗ denotes status of any incumbent, win or lose respectively.						
Party	Candidate	Votes	%	±%	Party votes	%	±%
CDU	Carsten Körber	64,857	44.6	▲5.7	64,872	44.4	▲8.5
Left	Sabine Zimmermann	35,847	24.6	▼3.5	31,061	21.3	▼6.4
SPD	Andreas Weigel	23,033	15.8	▲1.3	21,686	14.8	0.0
AfD					8,878	6.1	
NPD	Patrick Gentsch	5,918	4.1	▲0.3	4,664	3.2	▼0.5
Greens	Lars Dörner	4,334	3.0	▼0.6	4,653	3.2	▼1.3
FDP	Nico Tippelt	3,996	2.7	▼6.4	3,924	2.7	▼9.4
FW	Ingo Göschel	3,823	2.6		2,690	1.8	
Pirates	Edgar Tristan Drechsel	2,744	1.9		2,589	1.8	
PRO					478	0.3	
BüSo	Kai-Uwe Ducke	1,030	0.7	0.0	384	0.3	▼0.4
MLPD					175	0.1	▼0.1
Informal votes		2,723			2,251		
Total valid votes		145,582			146,054		
Turnout		148,305	68.1	▲4.7			
CDU hold	Majority	29,010	20.0	▲9.3			

=== 2009 election ===
Federal election (2009): Zwickau
Notes:	Blue background denotes the winner of the electorate vote. Pink background denotes a candidate elected from their party list. Yellow background denotes an electorate win by a list member, or other incumbent. A ✓ or ✗ denotes status of any incumbent, win or lose respectively.						
Party	Candidate	Votes	%	±%	Party votes	%	±%
CDU	✓ Michael Luther	55,605	38.8	▲4.3	51,459	35.9	▲6.6
Left	Sabine Zimmermann	40,265	28.1	▲2.5	39,659	27.7	▲2.5
SPD	Andreas Weigel	20,864	14.6	▼11.2	21,336	14.9	▼10.9
FDP	André Hubatschek	13,097	9.1	▲3.6	17,402	12.1	▲2.9
Greens	Martin Böttger	6,491	4.5	▲2.1	6,418	4.5	▲1.0
NPD	Patrick Gentsch	5,394	3.8	▲0.1	5,268	3.7	▼0.1
BüSo	Kai-Uwe Ducke	995	0.7	0.0	1,011	0.7	▲0.2
Independent	Klaus-Dieter Kramer	520	0.4				
REP					517	0.4	▼0.3
MLPD					316	0.2	▲0.1
Informal votes		2,383			2,228		
Total valid votes		143,231			143,386		
Turnout		145,614	63.4	▼11.5			
CDU hold	Majority	15,340	10.7	▲2.0			

=== 2005 election ===
Federal election (2005):Zwickau
Notes:	Blue background denotes the winner of the electorate vote. Pink background denotes a candidate elected from their party list. Yellow background denotes an electorate win by a list member, or other incumbent. A ✓ or ✗ denotes status of any incumbent, win or lose respectively.						
Party	Candidate	Votes	%	±%	Party votes	%	±%
CDU	✓ Michael Luther	49,064	34.6	▼4.8	41,637	29.3	▼4.2
Left	Sabine Zimmermann	37,000	26.1	▲7.7	36,237	25.5	▲8.9
SPD	Andreas Weigel	35,728	25.2	▼6.9	36,336	25.6	▼9.0
FDP	Nico Tippelt	7,897	5.6	▲0.3	13,186	9.3	▲2.6
NPD	Peter Klose	4,749	3.3		5,052	3.6	▲2.3
Greens	Martin Böttger	3,476	2.5	▼0.5	4,839	3.4	▼0.2
PBC	Winfried Seuß	1,563	1.1	0.0	1,610	1.1	▲0.1
BüSo	Kai-Uwe Ducke	1,294	0.9	▲0.1	744	0.5	▲0.2
REP	Mario Heinz	1,070	0.8		1,063	0.7	0.0
Alliance for Health, Peace and Social Justice					774	0.5	
SGP					243	0.2	
MLPD					172	0.1	
Informal votes		2,746			2,696		
Total valid votes		141,841			141,893		
Turnout		144,589	74.8	▲2.1			
CDU hold	Majority	12,064	8.5				
