= Chemnitzer Land =

Coordinates: 50°50′N 12°53′E

- District
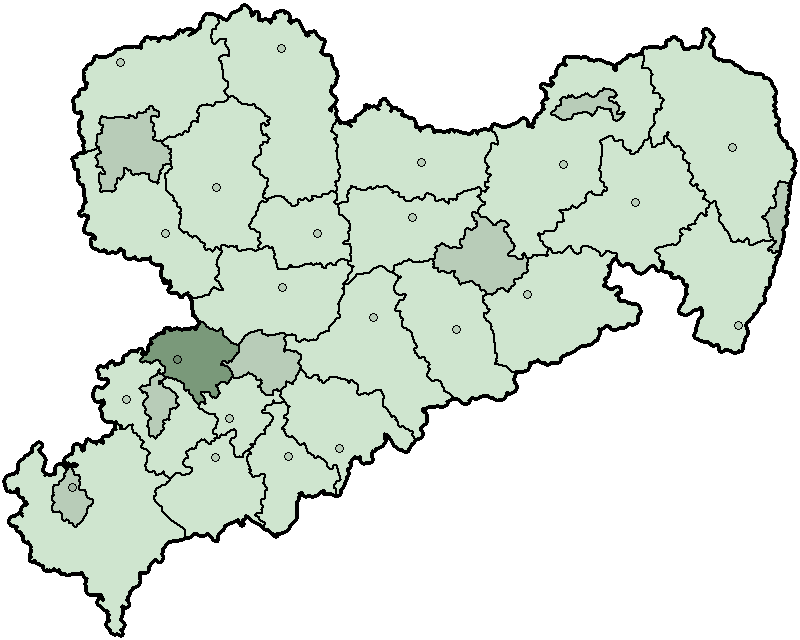
- Country: Germany
- State: Saxony
- Adm. region: Chemnitz
- Disbanded: 2008-08-01
- Capital: Glauchau

Area
  - Total: 336 km^{2} (130 sq mi)

Population (2001)
  - Total: 139,800
  - Density: 420/km^{2} (1,100/sq mi)
- Time zone: UTC+01:00 (CET)
  - Summer (DST): UTC+02:00 (CEST)
- Vehicle registration: GC
- Website: www.landkreis-chemnitzer-land.de

Chemnitzer Land is a former district in Saxony, Germany. It was bounded by (from the north and clockwise) the district of Mittweida, the city of Chemnitz, the districts of Stollberg and Zwickauer Land and the state of Thuringia (district Altenburger Land).

== History ==
The history of the region is largely influenced by the neighbouring cities of Chemnitz and Zwickau. In medieval times the town of Glauchau, today the capital of the district, was the centre of the county of Schönburg-Glauchau. The East German government attempted to turn the region into a huge industrial complex, which is the reason for the dense population.

The district was established in 1994 by merging the former districts of Glauchau and Hohenstein-Ernstthal. In August 2008, as a part of the district reform in Saxony, the districts of Zwickauer Land, Chemnitzer Land and the urban district Zwickau were merged into the new district Zwickau.

== Geography ==
Once a densely forested region, Chemnitzer Land now is a highly urbanised region with few green areas left. The Zwickauer Mulde river runs through the northernmost part of the district.

== Coat of arms ==
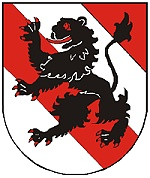
| The lion is the heraldic lion of Saxony. The red and white pattern is taken from the arms of the counts of Schönburg-Glauchau. |

== Towns and municipalities ==
Towns
1. Glauchau
2. Hohenstein-Ernstthal
3. Lichtenstein
4. Limbach-Oberfrohna
5. Meerane
6. Oberlungwitz
7. Waldenburg
Municipalities
1. Bernsdorf
2. Callenberg
3. Gersdorf
4. Niederfrohna
5. Oberwiera
6. Remse
7. Sankt Egidien
8. Schönberg
