= Zwickau 4 =

State electoral district of Germany

7: Zwickau 4
- Electoral district for the Landtag of Saxony
- Zwickau 4 in 2024
- District: Zwickau
- Electorate: 48,548 (2024)
- Major settlements: Glauchau, Lichtenstein, Meerane, and Waldenburg

Current electoral district
- Party: CDU
- Member: Daniela Pfeifer

Zwickau 4 is an electoral constituency (German: Wahlkreis) represented in the Landtag of Saxony. It elects one member via first-past-the-post voting. Under the constituency numbering system, it is designated as constituency 7. It is within the district of Zwickau.

== Geography ==
The constituency includes the towns of Glauchau, Lichtenstein, Meerane, and Waldenburg, and the municipalities of Bernsdorf, Oberwiera, Remse, Schönberg, and St. Egidien within Zwickau.

There were 48,548 eligible voters in 2024

== Members ==
Election	Member	Party	%
2014	Ines Springer	CDU	43.5
2019	Ines Springer	CDU	36.7
2024	Daniela Pfeifer	CDU	36.0

== Election results ==
=== 2024 election ===
State election (2024): Zwickau 4
Notes:	Blue background denotes the winner of the electorate vote. Pink background denotes a candidate elected from their party list. Yellow background denotes an electorate win by a list member, or other incumbent. A ✓ or ✗ denotes status of any incumbent, win or lose respectively.						
Party	Candidate	Votes	%	±%	Party votes	%	±%
CDU	Daniela Pfeifer	12,708	36.0	▼0.7	12,810	36.2	▼0.2
AfD	Andreas Gerold	12,404	35.1	▲7.9	11,326	32.0	▲6.3
BSW	Thomas Koutzky	4,021	11.4		4,471	12.6	
SPD	Antje Junghans	2,329	6.6	▼0.5	2,289	6.5	▼1.5
FW	Daniel Sickert	1,126	3.2	▼4.6	739	2.1	▼1.8
Left	Michael Berger	942	2.7	▼8.0	798	2.3	▼7.7
Greens	Mandy Bauch	816	2.3	▼3.0	753	2.1	▼3.0
FDP	Björn Bunzel	418	1.2	▼4.1	301	0.8	▼3.7
Freie Sachsen	André Krüger	361	1.0		814	2.3	
APT					389	1.1	
PARTEI					235	0.7	▼0.9
BD					120	0.3	
Bündnis C					93	0.3	
Values					79	0.2	
ÖDP	Jens Gagelmann	183	0.5		62	0.2	
Pirates					53	0.1	
dieBasis					48	0.1	
V-Partei3					28	0.1	
BüSo					22	0.1	
Informal votes		420			298		
Total valid votes		35,308			35,430		
Turnout		35,728	73.8	▲8.2			
CDU hold	Majority	304	0.9				

=== 2019 election ===
State election (2019): Zwickau 4
Notes:	Blue background denotes the winner of the electorate vote. Pink background denotes a candidate elected from their party list. Yellow background denotes an electorate win by a list member, or other incumbent. A ✓ or ✗ denotes status of any incumbent, win or lose respectively.						
Party	Candidate	Votes	%	±%	Party votes	%	±%
CDU	✓ Ines Springer	11,063	36.7	▼6.8	11,872	36.3	▼6.4
AfD		8,880	27.2		8,386	25.7	▲17.4
Left		3,485	10.7	▼10.9	3,239	9.9	▼9.1
FW		2,527	7.7	▲1.7	1,282	3.9	▲0.8
SPD		2,304	7.1	▼3.7	2,594	7.9	▼4.2
FDP		1,738	5.3	▼1.5	1,493	4.6	▲0.5
Greens		1,716	5.3	Steady	1,690	5.2	▲1.7
APT					609	1.9	▲0.9
PARTEI					527	1.6	▲1.1
NPD					400	1.2	▼3.7
Verjüngungsforschung					165	0.5	
The Blue Party					103	0.3	
ÖDP					86	0.3	
Pirates					73	0.2	▼0.4
Awakening of German Patriots - Central Germany					58	0.2	
Humanists					43	0.1	
PDV					30	0.1	
DKP					23	0.1	
BüSo					20	0.1	Steady
Informal votes		417			337		
Total valid votes		32,613			32,693		
Turnout		33,030	64.4	▲18.6			
CDU hold	Majority	3,083	9.5	▼12.4			

=== 2014 election ===
State election (2014): Zwickau 4
Notes:	Blue background denotes the winner of the electorate vote. Pink background denotes a candidate elected from their party list. Yellow background denotes an electorate win by a list member, or other incumbent. A ✓ or ✗ denotes status of any incumbent, win or lose respectively.						
Party	Candidate	Votes	%	±%	Party votes	%	±%
CDU	Ines Springer	10.673	43.5		10,527	42.7	
Left		5,293	21.6		4,677	19.0	
SPD		2,658	10.8		2,983	12.1	
AfD					2,047	8.3	
FDP		1,658	6.8		1,019	4.1	
NPD		1,482	6.0		1,204	4.9	
FW		1,469	6.0		757	3.1	
Greens		1,307	5.3		874	3.5	
APT					254	1.0	
Pirates					154	0.6	
PARTEI					112	0.5	
Pro Germany Citizens' Movement					25	0.1	
DSU					24	0.1	
BüSo					18	0.1	
Informal votes		403			268		
Total valid votes		24,540			24,675		
Turnout		24,943	45.8	▼15.3			
CDU win new seat	Majority	5,380	21.9				

== See also ==
- Politics of Saxony
- Landtag of Saxony
