= Zwickau 5 =

State electoral district of Germany

8: Zwickau 5
- Electoral district for the Landtag of Saxony
- Zwickau 5 in 2024
- District: Zwickau
- Electorate: 44,303 (2024)
- Major settlements: Hohenstein-Ernstthal, Limbach-Oberfrohna, and Oberlungwitz

Current electoral district
- Party: AfD
- Member: Mike Moncsek

Zwickau 5 is an electoral constituency (German: Wahlkreis) represented in the Landtag of Saxony. It elects one member via first-past-the-post voting. Under the constituency numbering system, it is designated as constituency 8. It is within the district of Zwickau.

== Geography ==
The constituency includes the towns of Hohenstein-Ernstthal, Limbach-Oberfrohna, and Oberlungwitz, and the municipalities of Callenberg, Gersdorf, and Niederfrohna within Zwickau.

There were 44,303 eligible voters in 2024

== Members ==
Election	Member	Party	%
2014	Jan Hippold	CDU	41.9
2019	Jan Hippold	CDU	39.6
2024	Mike Moncsek	AfD	34.6

== Election results ==
=== 2024 election ===
State election (2024): Zwickau 5
Notes:	Blue background denotes the winner of the electorate vote. Pink background denotes a candidate elected from their party list. Yellow background denotes an electorate win by a list member, or other incumbent. A ✓ or ✗ denotes status of any incumbent, win or lose respectively.						
Party	Candidate	Votes	%	±%	Party votes	%	±%
AfD	Mike Moncsek	11,242	34.6	▲6.6	10,333	31.8	▲5.7
CDU	Ina Klemm	11,057	34.1	▼5.5	11,488	35.3	▼1.1
FW	Kati Vogel	3,614	11.1		1,386	4.3	▼1.0
BSW	Sebastian Bernhardt	3,154	9.7		4,044	12.4	
SPD	Melanie Mandy Berthold	1,575	4.9	▼2.8	1,977	6.1	▼1.3
Left	Sven Voitel	756	2.3	▼11.2	681	2.1	▼7.8
Greens	Eva Katharina Kühner	615	1.9	▼4.2	702	2.2	▼3.2
FDP	Anne Sahmel	244	0.8	▼4.4	223	0.7	▼3.7
Freie Sachsen	Frank Neufert	207	0.6		797	2.5	
APT					303	0.9	
PARTEI					195	0.6	▼0.7
Bündnis C					83	0.3	
Values					72	0.2	
BD					64	0.2	
Pirates					51	0.2	
dieBasis					35	0.1	
V-Partei3					30	0.1	
ÖDP					27	0.1	
BüSo					20	0.1	
Informal votes		340			293		
Total valid votes		32,464			32,511		
Turnout		32,804	74.0	▲8.0			
AfD gain from CDU	Majority	185	0.5				

=== 2019 election ===
State election (2019): Zwickau 5
Notes:	Blue background denotes the winner of the electorate vote. Pink background denotes a candidate elected from their party list. Yellow background denotes an electorate win by a list member, or other incumbent. A ✓ or ✗ denotes status of any incumbent, win or lose respectively.						
Party	Candidate	Votes	%	±%	Party votes	%	±%
CDU	✓ Jan Hippold	11,815	39.6	▼2.3	10,944	36.4	▼7.2
AfD		8,349	28.0	▲19.2	7,836	26.1	▲17.2
Left		4,044	13.6	▼5.8	2,977	9.9	▼8.7
SPD		2,290	7.7	▼4.1	2,209	7.4	▼4.3
Greens		1,815	6.1	▲1.7	1,615	5.4	▲1.5
FW					1,573	5.2	▼0.7
FDP		1,526	5.1	▲1.6	1,326	4.4	▲0.6
APT					488	1.6	▲0.5
PARTEI					377	1.3	▲0.9
NPD					190	0.6	▼3.0
Verjüngungsforschung					124	0.4	
Awakening of German Patriots - Central Germany					74	0.2	
The Blue Party					68	0.2	
ÖDP					65	0.2	
Pirates					62	0.2	▼0.6
Humanists					39	0.1	
PDV					25	0.1	
DKP					24	0.1	
BüSo					13	0.0	▼0.1
Informal votes		526			336		
Total valid votes		29,839			30,029		
Turnout		30,365	65.6	▲19.1			
CDU hold	Majority	3,466	11.6	▼10.9			

=== 2014 election ===
State election (2014): Zwickau 5
Notes:	Blue background denotes the winner of the electorate vote. Pink background denotes a candidate elected from their party list. Yellow background denotes an electorate win by a list member, or other incumbent. A ✓ or ✗ denotes status of any incumbent, win or lose respectively.						
Party	Candidate	Votes	%	±%	Party votes	%	±%
CDU	Jan Hippold	9,245	41.9		9,641	43.6	
Left		4,268	19.4		4,104	18.6	
SPD		2,594	11.8		2,596	11.7	
AfD		1,932	8.8		1,975	8.9	
FW		1,295	5.9		737	3.3	
Greens		967	4.4		868	3.9	
FDP		775	3.5		836	3.8	
NPD		748	3.4		805	3.6	
APT					241	1.1	
Pirates		223	1.0		167	0.8	
PARTEI					82	0.4	
Pro Germany Citizens' Movement					33	0.1	
DSU					18	0.1	
BüSo					16	0.1	
Informal votes		342			270		
Total valid votes		22,047			22,119		
Turnout		22,389	46.5	▼15.0			
CDU win new seat	Majority	4,977	22.5				

== See also ==
- Politics of Saxony
- Landtag of Saxony
