= Günther Müller =

German musicologist (1925–2020)

Günther Müller (19 January 1925 – 3 March 2020) was a German conductor, music teacher and musicologist. He was born in Gersdorf.

In 1990 Günther Müller received the Robert Schumann Prize of the City of Zwickau. In 2007 he was awarded the honorary medal of the city of Glauchau.

Müller conducted performances in the Kulturpalast Dresden as well as in the opera houses of Dessau and Chemnitz. Since 1953 he worked as general music director at the opera house in Glauchau.
