= Tippelt =

Tippelt is a surname. Notable people with the surname include:

- Nico Tippelt (born 1967), German politician
- Sven Tippelt (born 1965), German gymnast
