= Langenbernsdorf =

- Municipality
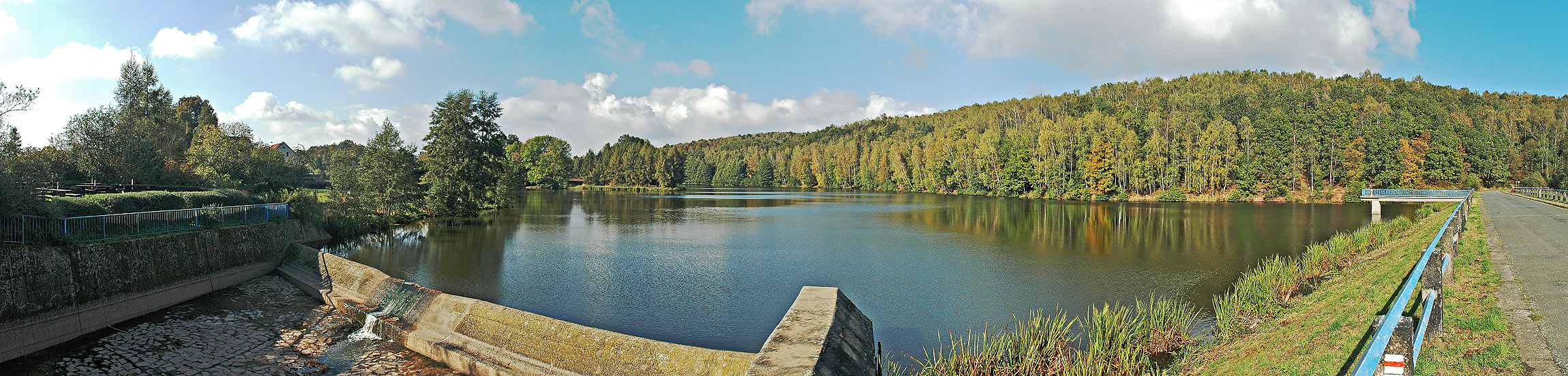

- Location of Langenbernsdorf within Zwickau district
- Interactive map of Langenbernsdorf
- Location within Germany Location within Saxony
- Coordinates: 50°45′N 12°18′E
- Country: Germany
- State: Saxony
- District: Zwickau
- Subdivisions: 4

Government
  - Mayor (2023–30): Tobias Bär (CDU)

Area
  - Total: 36.37 km^{2} (14.04 sq mi)
- Elevation: 280 m (920 ft)

Population (2025-12-31)
  - Total: 3,336
  - Density: 91.72/km^{2} (237.6/sq mi)
- Time zone: UTC+01:00 (CET)
  - Summer (DST): UTC+02:00 (CEST)
- Postal codes: 08428
- Dialling codes: 03761
- Vehicle registration: Z
- Website: www.langenbernsdorf.de

Langenbernsdorf is a village in the district of Zwickau in the Free State of Saxony.

== Geography ==
To the north of Langenbernsdorf is a wood called the Werdauer Wald.

=== Neighboring municipalities ===
Adjacent municipalities in the district of Zwickau include:

- Zwickau
- Neukirchen
- Werdau
- Crimmitschau
- Seelingstädt

Teichwolframsdorf in Thuringia is also adjacent to Langenbernsdorf.

=== Municipality subdivisions ===
The municipality includes the following subdivisions:

- Langenbernsdorf
- Niederalbertsdorf
- Stöcken
- Trünzig

== History ==
Langenbernsdorf was founded in 1257 and was named "Bernztorff".
