= Schönberg, Saxony =

Schönberg
- Municipality
- Location of Schönberg within Zwickau district
- Interactive map of Schönberg
- Location within Germany Location within Saxony
- Coordinates: 50°52′N 12°30′E
- Country: Germany
- State: Saxony
- District: Zwickau
- Subdivisions: 6

Government
  - Mayor (2022–29): Dietmar Öhler (CDU)

Area
  - Total: 15.43 km^{2} (5.96 sq mi)
- Elevation: 287 m (942 ft)

Population (2025-12-31)
  - Total: 845
  - Density: 54.8/km^{2} (142/sq mi)
- Time zone: UTC+01:00 (CET)
  - Summer (DST): UTC+02:00 (CEST)
- Postal codes: 08393
- Dialling codes: 03764
- Vehicle registration: Z

Schönberg (German pronunciation: [ˈʃøːnbɛʁk]) is a municipality in the district of Zwickau in Saxony in Germany.
