= Langenweißbach =

- Municipality
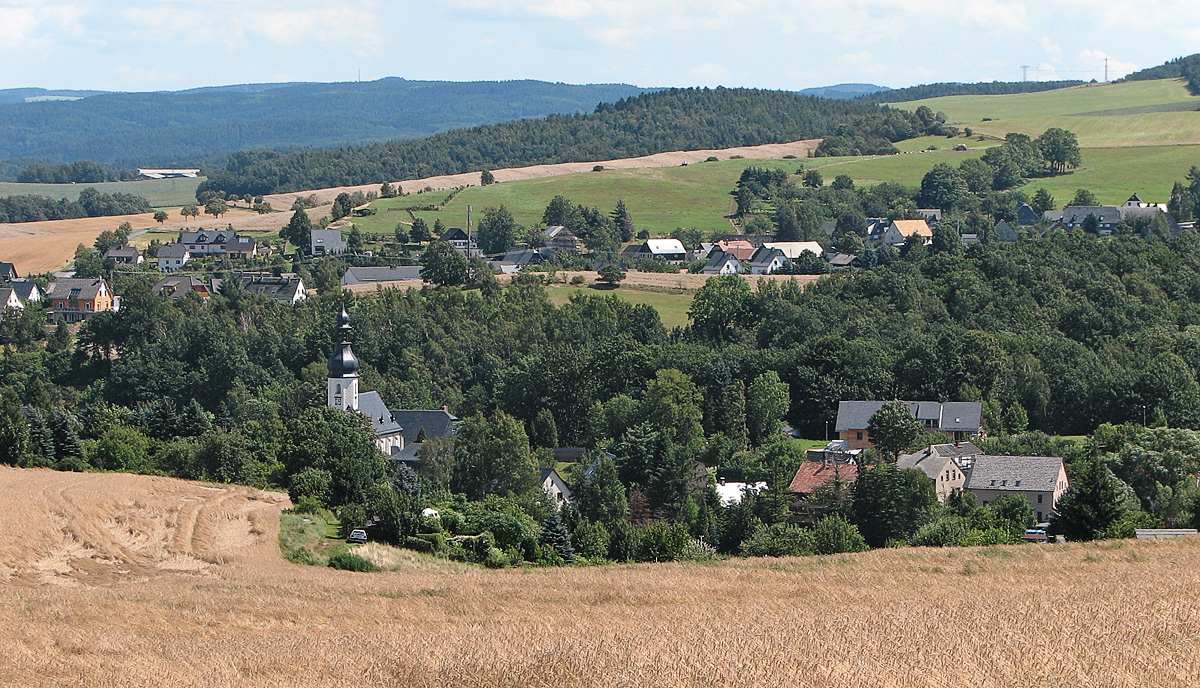
- View on the Weißbach part of the town

- Location of Langenweißbach within Zwickau district
- Interactive map of Langenweißbach
- Location within Germany Location within Saxony
- Coordinates: 50°38′24″N 12°36′46″E
- Country: Germany
- State: Saxony
- District: Zwickau
- Subdivisions: 3

Government
  - Mayor (2017–24): Jens Wächtler

Area
  - Total: 22.49 km^{2} (8.68 sq mi)
- Elevation: 370 m (1,210 ft)

Population (2025-12-31)
  - Total: 2,311
  - Density: 102.8/km^{2} (266.1/sq mi)
- Time zone: UTC+01:00 (CET)
  - Summer (DST): UTC+02:00 (CEST)
- Postal codes: 08134
- Dialling codes: 037603
- Vehicle registration: Z
- Website: www.langenweissbach.de

Langenweißbach is a municipality in the district Zwickau in the state of Saxony in eastern Germany.
