= Mülsen =

- Municipality
- Location of Mülsen within Zwickau district
- Interactive map of Mülsen
- Location within Germany Location within Saxony
- Coordinates: 50°44′41″N 12°34′29″E
- Country: Germany
- State: Saxony
- District: Zwickau
- Subdivisions: 11

Government
  - Mayor (2020–27): Michael Franke (FW)

Area
  - Total: 49.7 km^{2} (19.2 sq mi)
- Elevation: 246–449 m (807–1,473 ft)

Population (2025-12-31)
  - Total: 10,593
  - Density: 213/km^{2} (552/sq mi)
- Time zone: UTC+01:00 (CET)
  - Summer (DST): UTC+02:00 (CEST)
- Postal codes: 08132
- Dialling codes: 037601
- Vehicle registration: Z
- Website: www.muelsen.de

Mülsen (German pronunciation: [ˈmʏlzn̩]) is a municipality in Germany, Landkreis Zwickau in Saxony. It is situated 6 km northeast of Zwickau.
