= Carsten Körber =

German politician

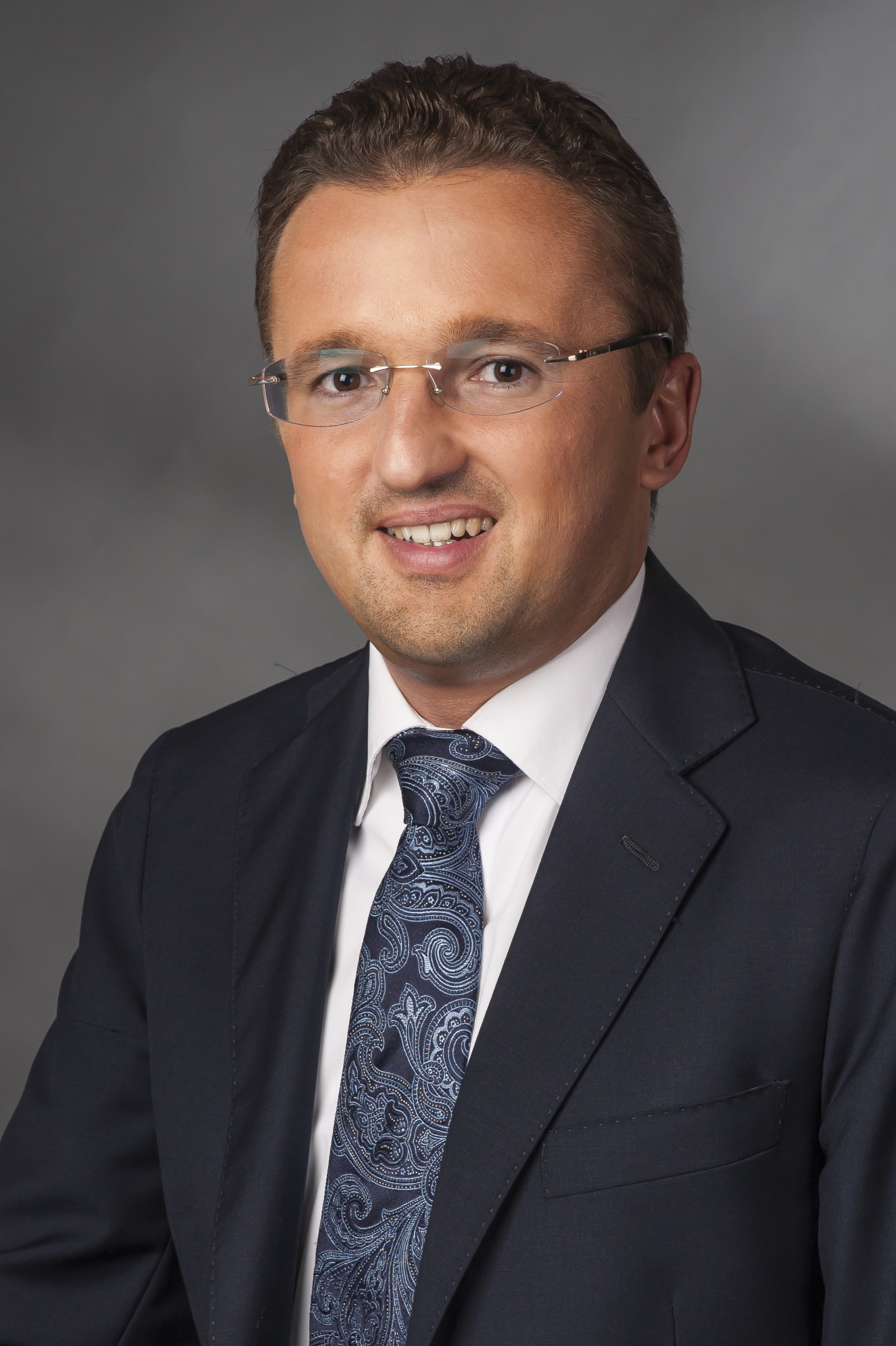
- Carsten Körber in 2014

Member of the Bundestag
- Incumbent
- Assumed office 2013
- Preceded by: Michael Luther

Personal details
- Born: 11 June 1979 (age 47) Zwickau, East Germany (now Germany)
- Party: CDU
- Education: Chemnitz University of Technology

Carsten Körber (born 11 June 1979) is a German politician of the Christian Democratic Union (CDU) who has been serving as a member of the Bundestag from the state of Saxony since 2013.

== Political career ==
Körber first became member of the Bundestag in the 2013 German federal election.

In parliament, Körber has been a member of the Budget Committee and the Audit Committee. In this capacity, he has served as his parliamentary group's rapporteur on the annual budgets of the Federal Ministry for Economic Cooperation and Development (2017–2025), the Federal Constitutional Court, the Federal Foreign Office (2022–2025), the Federal Council (since 2025) and the Federal Ministry of Research, Technology and Space (since 2025). In March 2021, Körber replaced Axel Fischer as chair of the Audit Committee.

Following the 2025 elections, Körber was a candidate for the role of one of CDU/CSU parliamentary group's deputy chairs, under the leadership of chairman Jens Spahn; in an internal vote, however, he lost out against Sepp Müller.

== Other activities ==
- German Corporation for International Cooperation (GIZ), Member of the Supervisory Board (2018–2025)
