= Dennheritz =

- Municipality
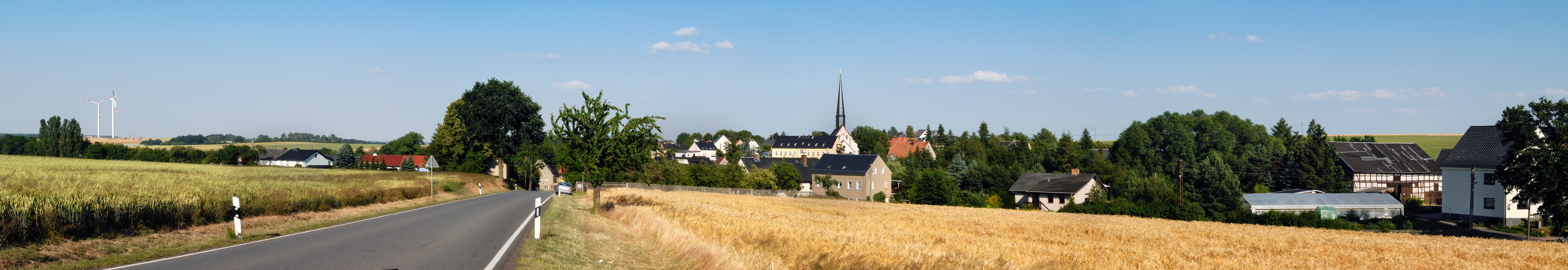
- Panoramic view

- Location of Dennheritz within Zwickau district
- Interactive map of Dennheritz
- Location within Germany Location within Saxony
- Coordinates: 50°48′55″N 12°27′40″E
- Country: Germany
- State: Saxony
- District: Zwickau
- Subdivisions: 3

Government
  - Mayor (2023–30): Matthias Trenkel

Area
  - Total: 13.35 km^{2} (5.15 sq mi)
- Elevation: 241–320 m (791–1,050 ft)

Population (2025-12-31)
  - Total: 1,247
  - Density: 93.41/km^{2} (241.9/sq mi)
- Time zone: UTC+01:00 (CET)
  - Summer (DST): UTC+02:00 (CEST)
- Postal codes: 08393
- Dialling codes: 03763
- Vehicle registration: Z
- Website: www.dennheritz.de

Dennheritz is a municipality in the district Zwickau, in Saxony, Germany.

== Mayors ==
- 2004-2009: Bernd Voigt
- 2009–2023: Frank Taubert
- 2023– : Matthias Trenkel
