= Niederfrohna =

- Municipality
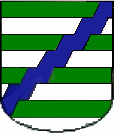
- Coat of arms

- Location of Niederfrohna within Zwickau district
- Interactive map of Niederfrohna
- Location within Germany Location within Saxony
- Coordinates: 50°52′50″N 12°44′44″E
- Country: Germany
- State: Saxony
- District: Zwickau
- Subdivisions: 4

Government
  - Mayor (2022–29): Jens Hinkelmann

Area
  - Total: 10.11 km^{2} (3.90 sq mi)
- Elevation: 305 m (1,001 ft)

Population (2025-12-31)
  - Total: 2,136
  - Density: 211.3/km^{2} (547.2/sq mi)
- Time zone: UTC+01:00 (CET)
  - Summer (DST): UTC+02:00 (CEST)
- Postal codes: 09243
- Dialling codes: 03722
- Vehicle registration: Z
- Website: www.niederfrohna.de

Niederfrohna (German pronunciation: [niːdɐˈfʁoːna], lit. 'Lower Frohna', in contrast to "Upper Frohna") is a municipality in the district of Zwickau in Saxony in Germany.
