= Lichtentanne =

- Municipality
- Location of Lichtentanne within Zwickau district
- Interactive map of Lichtentanne
- Location within Germany Location within Saxony
- Coordinates: 50°42′N 12°26′E
- Country: Germany
- State: Saxony
- District: Zwickau
- Subdivisions: 4

Government
  - Mayor (2017–24): Tino Obst

Area
  - Total: 27.32 km^{2} (10.55 sq mi)
- Elevation: 329 m (1,079 ft)

Population (2025-12-31)
  - Total: 5,846
  - Density: 214.0/km^{2} (554.2/sq mi)
- Time zone: UTC+01:00 (CET)
  - Summer (DST): UTC+02:00 (CEST)
- Postal codes: 08115, 08144
- Dialling codes: 0375, 037600, 037607
- Vehicle registration: Z
- Website: www.gemeinde-lichtentanne.de

Lichtentanne (German pronunciation: [ˈlɪçtn̩tanə]) is a municipality in the district Zwickau, in Saxony, Germany.
