= Sankt Egidien =

- Municipality
- Location of Sankt Egidien within Zwickau district
- Interactive map of Sankt Egidien
- Location within Germany Location within Saxony
- Coordinates: 50°47′6″N 12°37′12″E
- Country: Germany
- State: Saxony
- District: Zwickau
- Subdivisions: 3

Government
  - Mayor (2020–27): Uwe Redlich

Area
  - Total: 21.24 km^{2} (8.20 sq mi)
- Elevation: 261 m (856 ft)

Population (2025-12-31)
  - Total: 3,025
  - Density: 142.4/km^{2} (368.9/sq mi)
- Time zone: UTC+01:00 (CET)
  - Summer (DST): UTC+02:00 (CEST)
- Postal codes: 09356
- Dialling codes: 037204
- Vehicle registration: Z
- Website: www.sankt-egidien.de

Sankt Egidien (Saint Egidien) is a municipality in the district of Zwickau in Saxony in Germany.

== History ==
The town was named after Saint Giles, allegedly for missionary work done by him or his disciples to the Goths.
