= Hartmannsdorf bei Kirchberg =

- Municipality
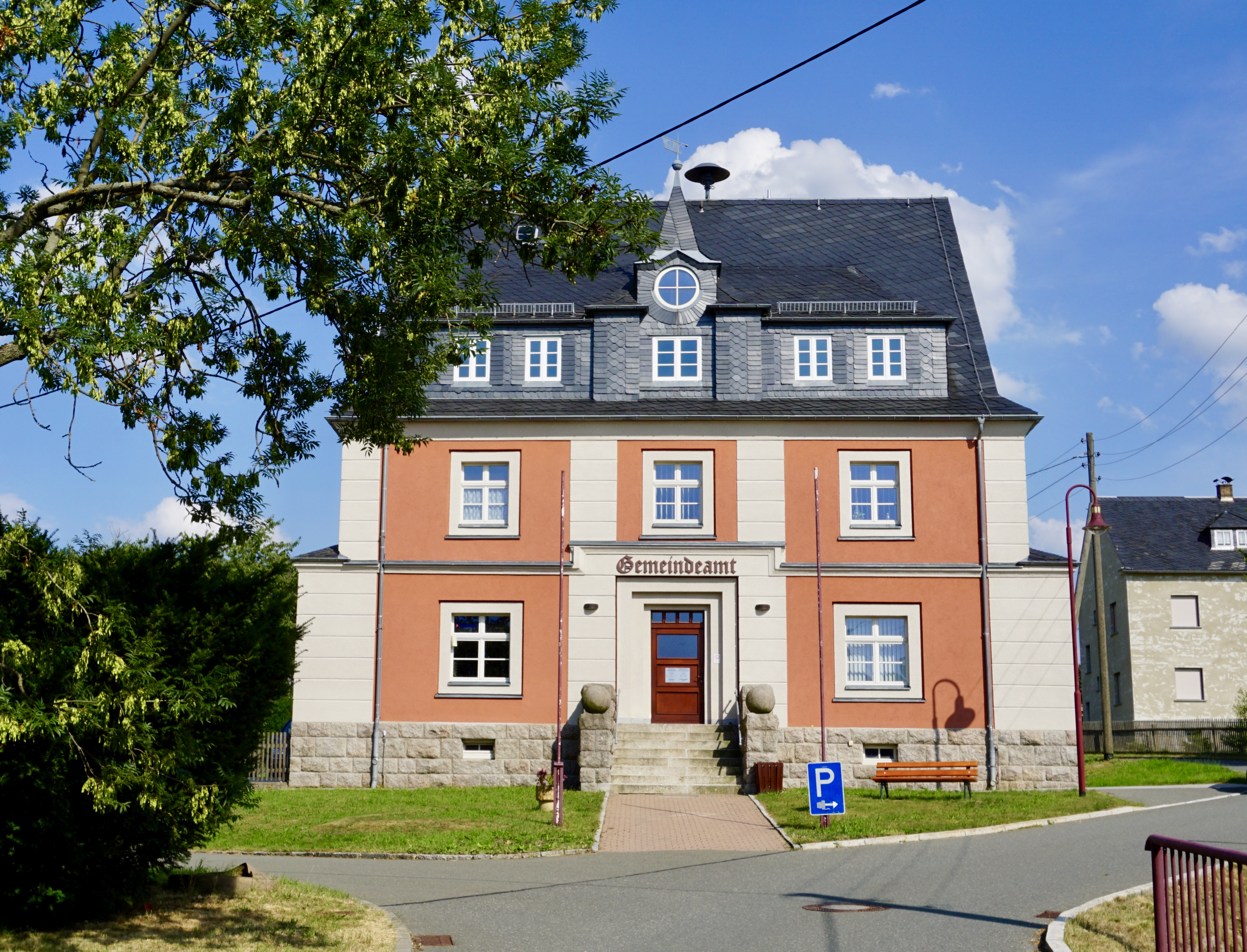
- Municipal office

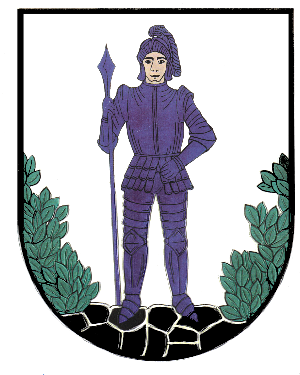
- Coat of arms

- Location of Hartmannsdorf bei Kirchberg within Zwickau district
- Interactive map of Hartmannsdorf bei Kirchberg
- Location within Germany Location within Saxony
- Coordinates: 50°35′N 12°33′E
- Country: Germany
- State: Saxony
- District: Zwickau
- Subdivisions: 2

Government
  - Mayor (2021–28): Christfried Nicolaus (CDU)

Area
  - Total: 27.17 km^{2} (10.49 sq mi)
- Elevation: 418 m (1,371 ft)

Population (2025-12-31)
  - Total: 1,316
  - Density: 48.44/km^{2} (125.4/sq mi)
- Time zone: UTC+01:00 (CET)
  - Summer (DST): UTC+02:00 (CEST)
- Postal codes: 08107
- Dialling codes: 037602
- Vehicle registration: Z
- Website: www.hartmannsdorf-giegengruen.de

Hartmannsdorf bei Kirchberg (German pronunciation: [ˈhaʁtmansdɔʁf baɪ ˈkɪʁçbɛʁk], lit. 'Hartmannsdorf near Kirchberg') is a municipality in the district Zwickau, in Saxony, Germany.
