= Crinitzberg =

- Municipality
- Location of Crinitzberg within Zwickau district
- Interactive map of Crinitzberg
- Location within Germany Location within Saxony
- Coordinates: 50°34′0″N 12°30′30″E
- Country: Germany
- State: Saxony
- District: Zwickau
- Subdivisions: 3

Government
  - Mayor (2022–29): Steffen Pachan

Area
  - Total: 18.82 km^{2} (7.27 sq mi)
- Elevation: 425–610 m (1,394–2,001 ft)

Population (2025-12-31)
  - Total: 1,716
  - Density: 91.18/km^{2} (236.2/sq mi)
- Time zone: UTC+01:00 (CET)
  - Summer (DST): UTC+02:00 (CEST)
- Postal codes: 08147
- Dialling codes: 037462
- Vehicle registration: Z
- Website: www.crinitzberg.de

Crinitzberg is a municipality in the district of Zwickau, in Saxony, Germany.

== Sons and daughters of the community ==
- Frank Bretschneider (born 1956 in Obercrinitz), musician and video artist
