= Fraureuth =

- Municipality
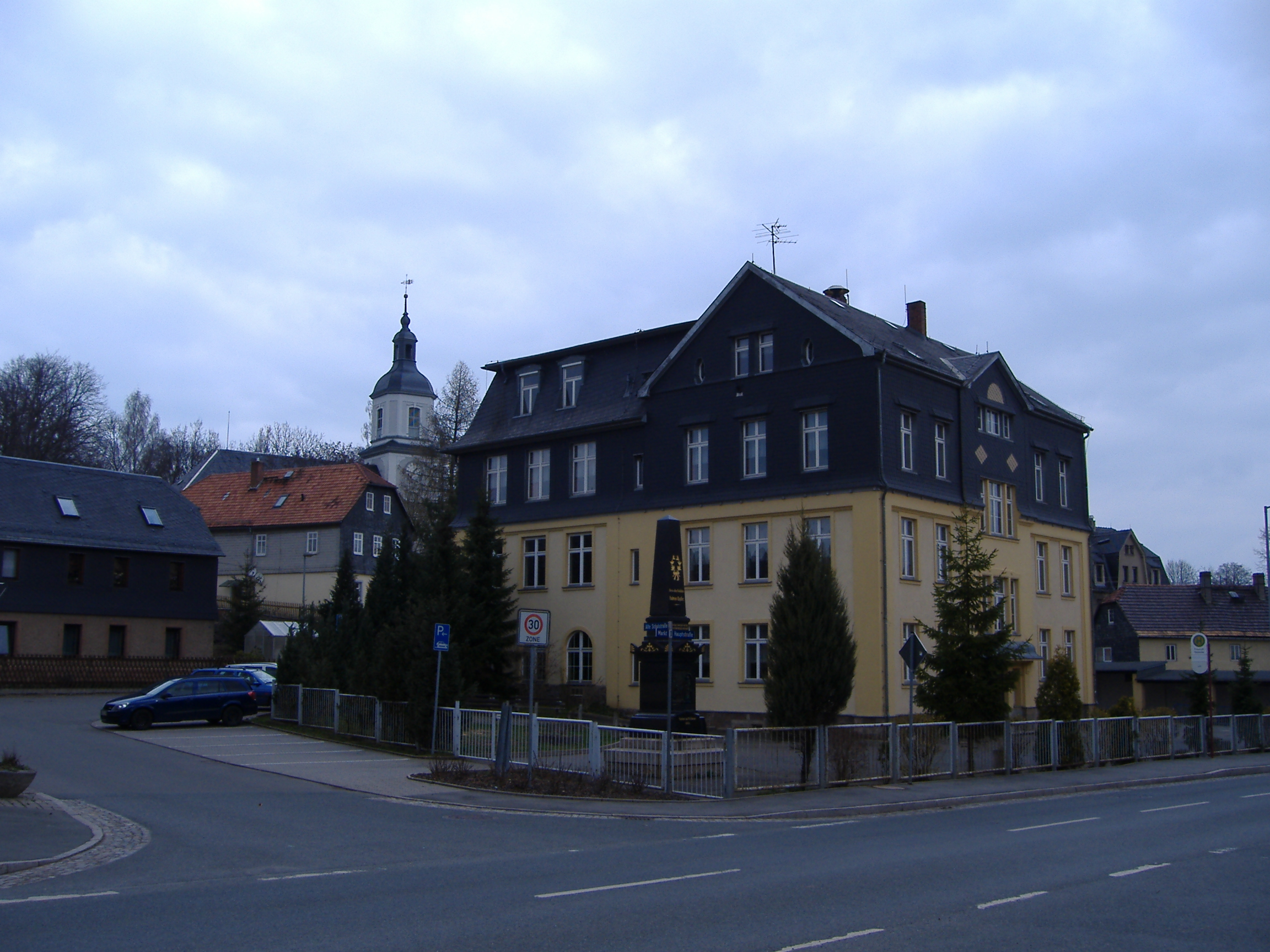
- School house Fraureuth

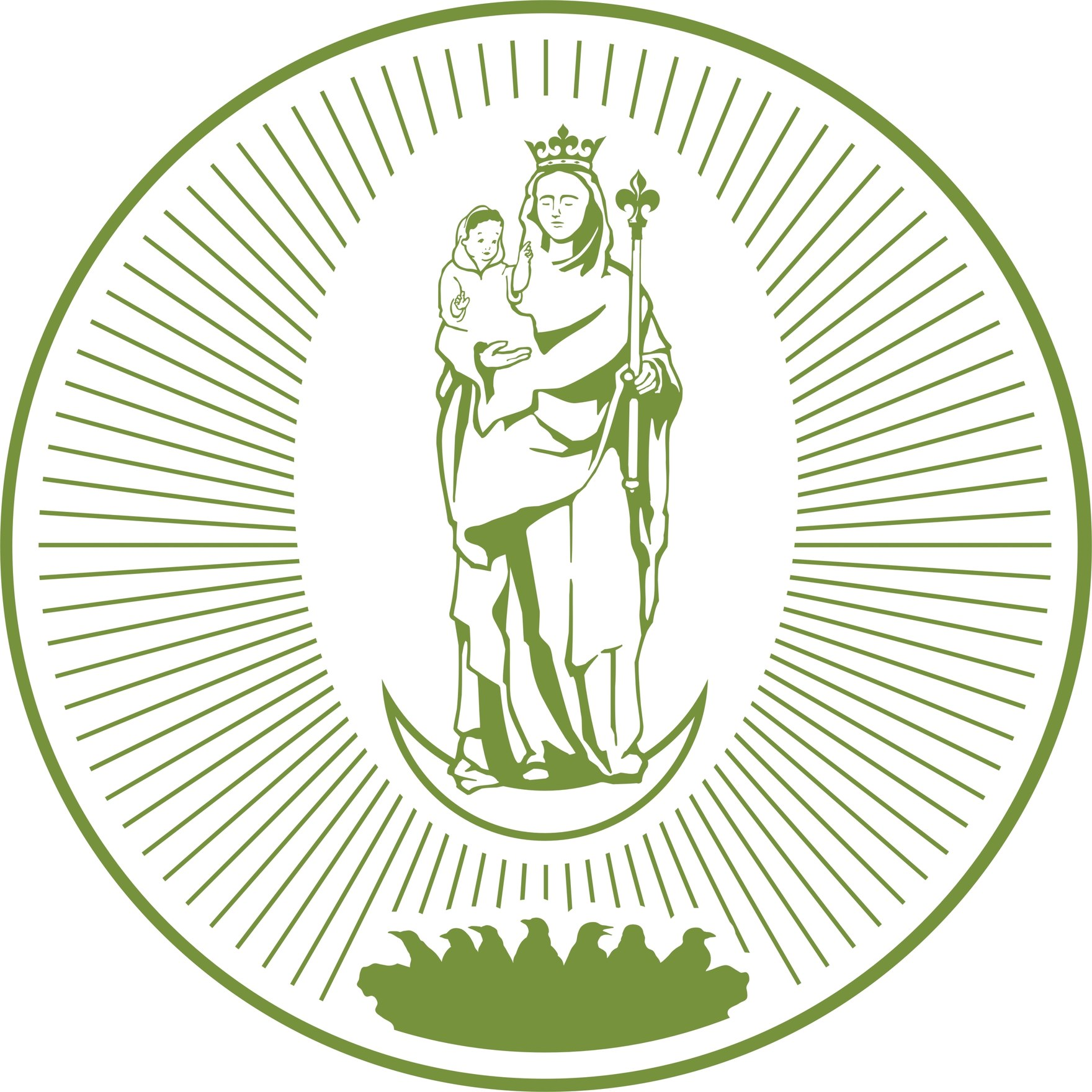
- Coat of arms

- Location of Fraureuth within Zwickau district
- Interactive map of Fraureuth
- Location within Germany Location within Saxony
- Coordinates: 50°42′N 12°21′E
- Country: Germany
- State: Saxony
- District: Zwickau
- Subdivisions: 4

Government
  - Mayor (2019–26): Matthias Topitsch (CDU)

Area
  - Total: 22.59 km^{2} (8.72 sq mi)
- Elevation: 330 m (1,080 ft)

Population (2025-12-31)
  - Total: 4,969
  - Density: 220.0/km^{2} (569.7/sq mi)
- Time zone: UTC+01:00 (CET)
  - Summer (DST): UTC+02:00 (CEST)
- Postal codes: 08427
- Dialling codes: 03761
- Vehicle registration: Z
- Website: www.fraureuth.de

Fraureuth, located in the district of Zwickau, is a small town in Saxony, Germany. It has a population of around 5,000 inhabitants on a surface of 22.59 km^{2}. Fraureuth was a component of Thuringia until 1952.

The musicologist Sigrid Neef was born in Fraureuth in 1944.
