= Gersdorf, Saxony =

Gersdorf
- Municipality
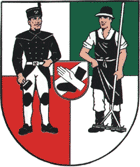
- Coat of arms

- Location of Gersdorf within Zwickau district
- Interactive map of Gersdorf
- Location within Germany Location within Saxony
- Coordinates: 50°45′35″N 12°42′30″E
- Country: Germany
- State: Saxony
- District: Zwickau

Government
  - Mayor (2017–24): Erik Seidel

Area
  - Total: 9.7 km^{2} (3.7 sq mi)
- Elevation: 315 m (1,033 ft)

Population (2025-12-31)
  - Total: 3,649
  - Density: 380/km^{2} (970/sq mi)
- Time zone: UTC+01:00 (CET)
  - Summer (DST): UTC+02:00 (CEST)
- Postal codes: 09355
- Dialling codes: 037203
- Vehicle registration: Z (old: GC, HOT)
- Website: www.gemeinde-gersdorf.de

Gersdorf (German pronunciation: [ˈɡɛʁsdɔʁf]) is a municipality in the district of Zwickau in Saxony in Germany. The conductor Günther Müller was born in Gersdorf in 1925.
