= Callenberg =

- Municipality
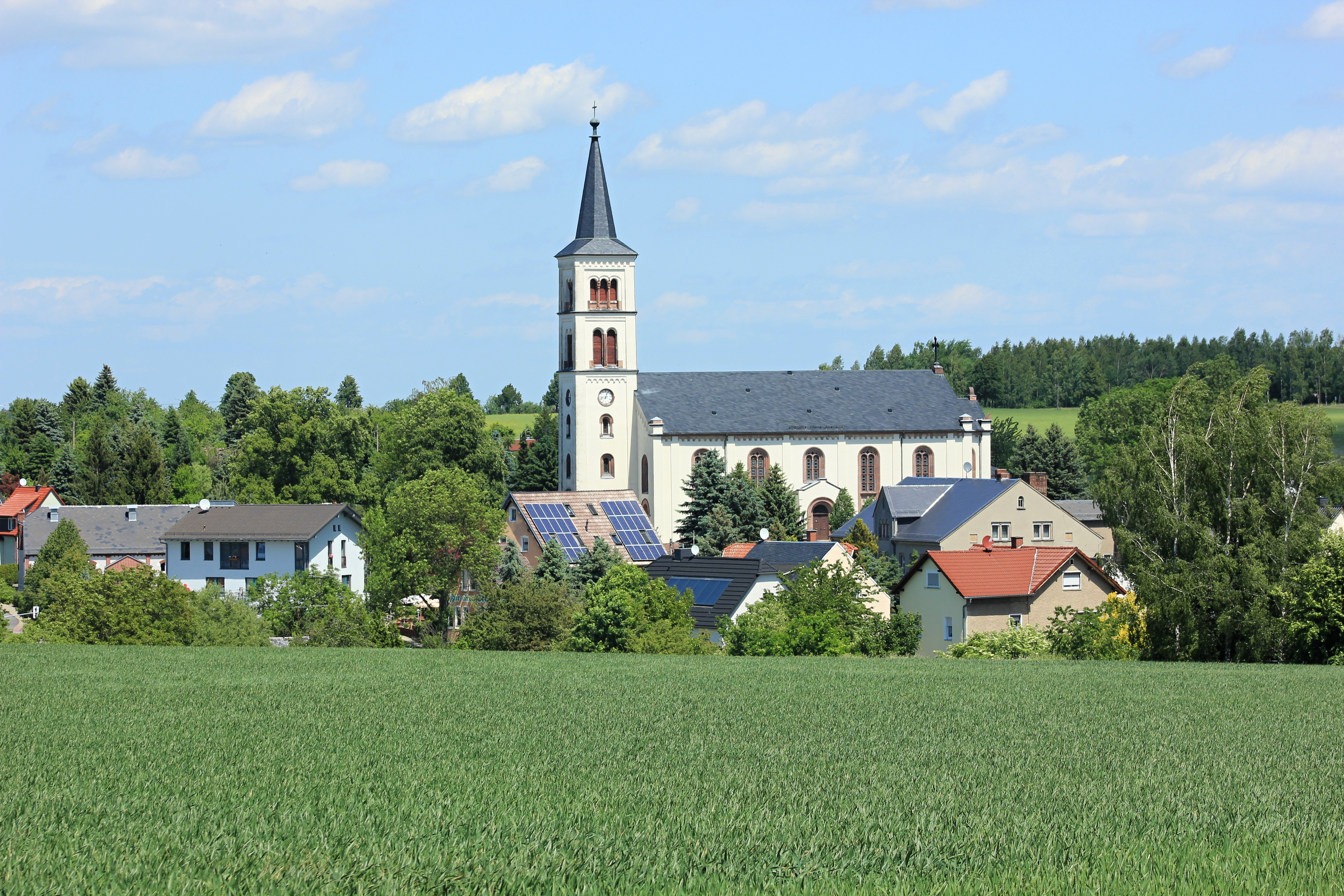
- Church in Callenberg

- Location of Callenberg within Zwickau district
- Interactive map of Callenberg
- Location within Germany Location within Saxony
- Coordinates: 50°50′42″N 12°38′15″E
- Country: Germany
- State: Saxony
- District: Zwickau
- Subdivisions: 7

Government
  - Mayor (2020–27): Daniel Röthig (CDU)

Area
  - Total: 39.86 km^{2} (15.39 sq mi)
- Elevation: 397 m (1,302 ft)

Population (2025-12-31)
  - Total: 4,594
  - Density: 115.3/km^{2} (298.5/sq mi)
- Time zone: UTC+01:00 (CET)
  - Summer (DST): UTC+02:00 (CEST)
- Postal codes: 09337
- Dialling codes: 03723, 037608
- Vehicle registration: Z
- Website: www.callenberg.de

Callenberg (German pronunciation: [ˈkalənbɛʁk]) is a municipality in the district of Zwickau, in Saxony, Germany.
