= Nico Tippelt =

German politician

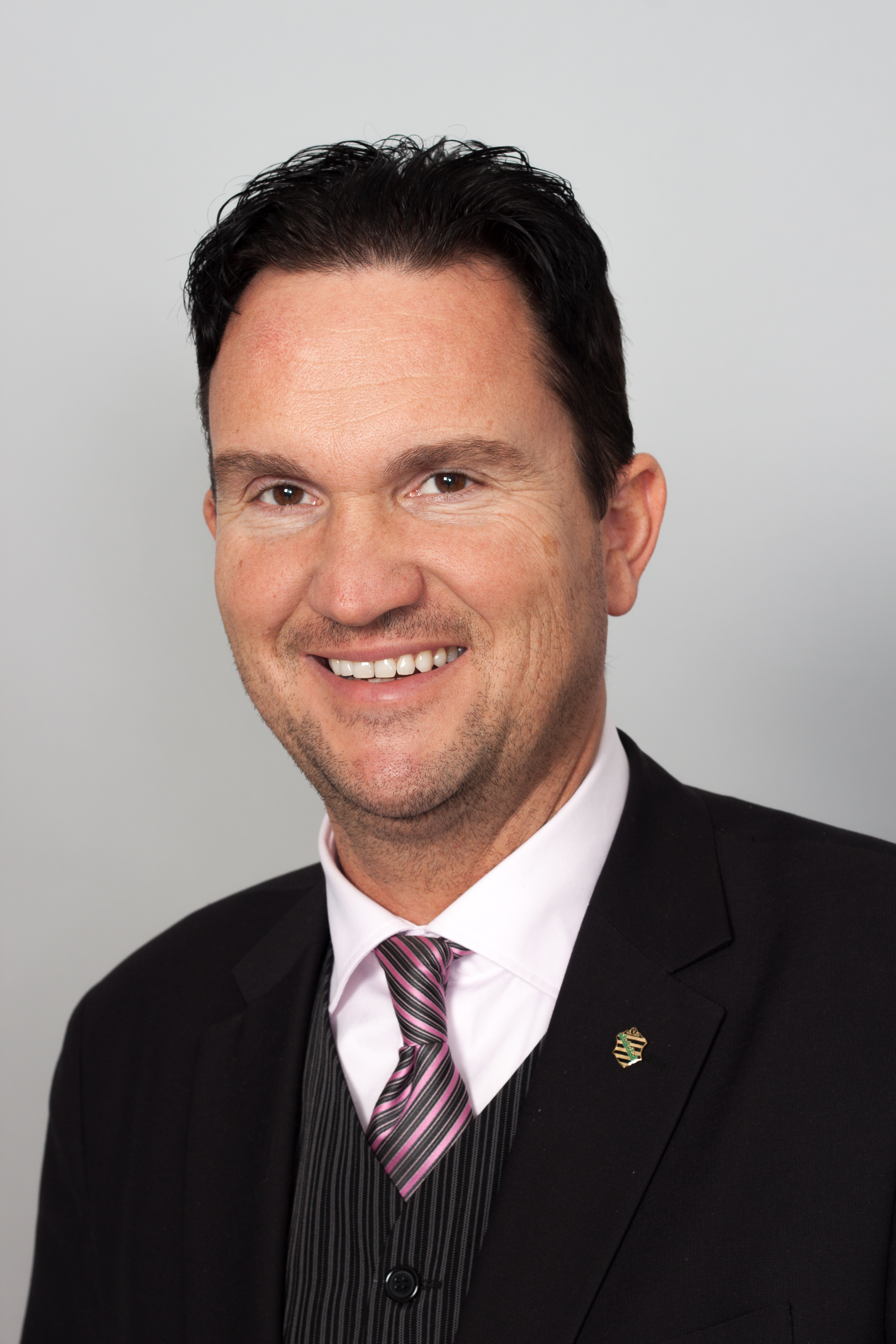

Member of the Bundestag
- In office 2021–2025

Personal details
- Born: 25 April 1967 (age 59) Zwickau
- Party: Free Democratic Party

Nico Tippelt (born 25 April 1967 in Zwickau) is a German politician for the FDP and from 2021 to March 2025 is a member of the Bundestag, the federal diet.

== Life and politics ==
Tippelt was born in the East German city of Zwickau and studied music.
