= Lichtenstein, Saxony =

Lichtenstein/Sa.
- Town
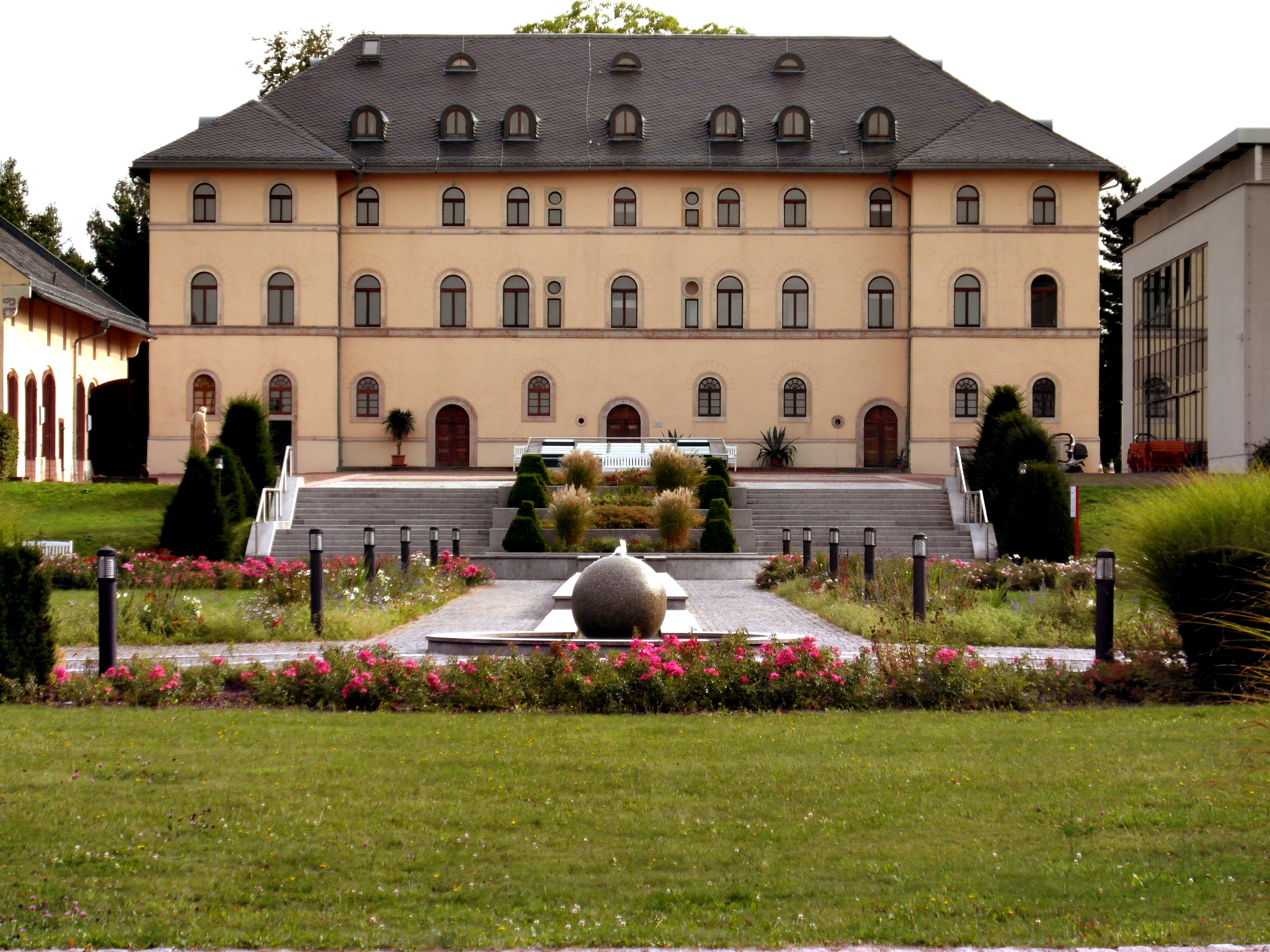
- The rear façade of the palace in Lichtenstein.

- Coat of arms

- Location of Lichtenstein/Sa. within Zwickau district
- Interactive map of Lichtenstein/Sa.
- Location within Germany Location within Saxony
- Coordinates: 50°45′23″N 12°37′54″E
- Country: Germany
- State: Saxony
- District: Zwickau
- Subdivisions: 3

Government
  - Mayor (2022–29): Jochen Fankhänel (FW)

Area
  - Total: 15.47 km^{2} (5.97 sq mi)
- Elevation: 336 m (1,102 ft)

Population (2025-12-31)
  - Total: 10,773
  - Density: 696.4/km^{2} (1,804/sq mi)
- Time zone: UTC+01:00 (CET)
  - Summer (DST): UTC+02:00 (CEST)
- Postal codes: 09350
- Dialling codes: 037204
- Vehicle registration: Z
- Website: www.lichtenstein-sachsen.de

Lichtenstein (German pronunciation: [ˈlɪçtn̩ʃtaɪn]; officially Lichtenstein/Sa.) is a town in the Zwickau district, in Saxony, Germany. It is situated 11 km northeast of Zwickau, and 22 km southwest of Chemnitz. It was owned by the House of Schönburg from 1286 until 1945.

== People ==
- Felix Hitzig (born 1988), politician

== See also ==
- Media related to Lichtenstein/Sa. at Wikimedia Commons
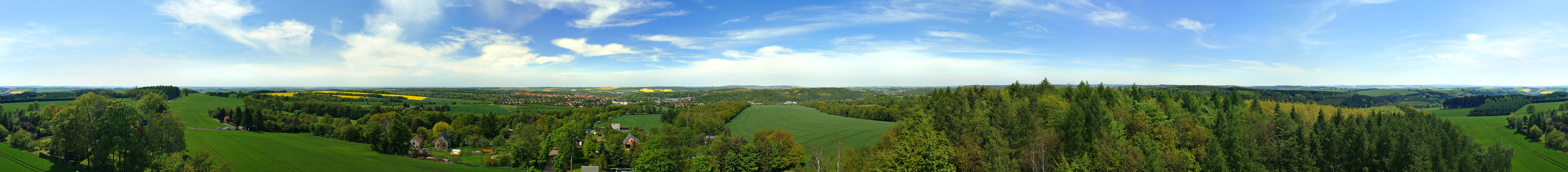
360 degree panorama of Lichtenstein and the surrounding area
Descriptions for the above panorama

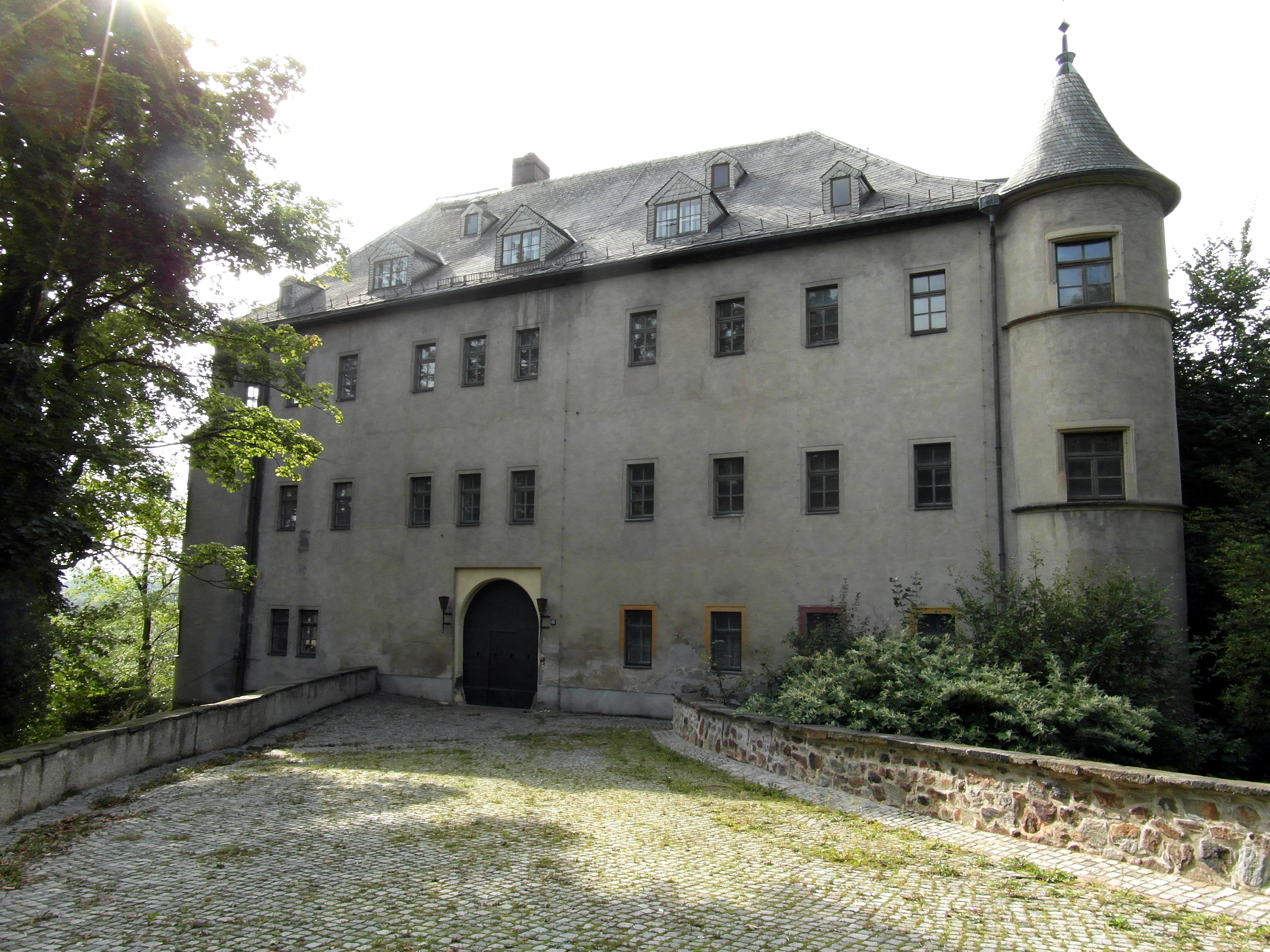
The Old Castle at Lichtenstein
