= Neukirchen, Zwickau =

Neukirchen/Pleiße
- Municipality
- Location of Neukirchen/Pleiße within Zwickau district
- Interactive map of Neukirchen/Pleiße
- Location within Germany Location within Saxony
- Coordinates: 50°48′N 12°22′E
- Country: Germany
- State: Saxony
- District: Zwickau
- Subdivisions: 3

Government
  - Mayor (2017–24): Ines Liebald (CDU)

Area
  - Total: 16.89 km^{2} (6.52 sq mi)
- Elevation: 250 m (820 ft)

Population (2025-12-31)
  - Total: 3,751
  - Density: 222.1/km^{2} (575.2/sq mi)
- Time zone: UTC+01:00 (CET)
  - Summer (DST): UTC+02:00 (CEST)
- Postal codes: 08459
- Dialling codes: 03762
- Vehicle registration: Z
- Website: www.neukirchen-pleisse.de

Neukirchen/Pleiße (German pronunciation: [nɔʏˈkɪʁçn̩]) is a municipality in the district Zwickau, in Saxony, Germany.
