= Oberlungwitz =

- Town
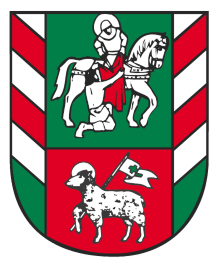
- Coat of arms

- Location of Oberlungwitz within Zwickau district
- Interactive map of Oberlungwitz
- Location within Germany Location within Saxony
- Coordinates: 50°47′N 12°43′E
- Country: Germany
- State: Saxony
- District: Zwickau

Government
  - Mayor (2022–29): Thomas Hetzel (FDP)

Area
  - Total: 14.68 km^{2} (5.67 sq mi)
- Elevation: 350 m (1,150 ft)

Population (2025-12-31)
  - Total: 5,672
  - Density: 386.4/km^{2} (1,001/sq mi)
- Time zone: UTC+01:00 (CET)
  - Summer (DST): UTC+02:00 (CEST)
- Postal codes: 09353
- Dialling codes: 03723
- Vehicle registration: Z
- Website: www.oberlungwitz.de

Oberlungwitz (German: [ˈoːbɐˌlʊŋvɪts]) is a town in the Zwickau district, in Saxony, Germany. It is situated 18 km northeast of Zwickau, and 15 km west of Chemnitz.
