= Zwickau (district) =

Coordinates: 50°45′N 12°30′E

- District
- Flag Coat of arms
- Country: Germany
- State: Saxony
- Capital: Zwickau

Government
  - District admin.: Carsten Michaelis (CDU)

Area
  - Total: 949 km^{2} (366 sq mi)

Population (31 December 2022)
  - Total: 310,838
  - Density: 330/km^{2} (850/sq mi)
- Time zone: UTC+01:00 (CET)
  - Summer (DST): UTC+02:00 (CEST)
- Vehicle registration: Z, GC, HOT, WDA
- Website: landkreis-zwickau.de

Zwickau (German: Landkreis Zwickau) is a district (Kreis) in the Free State of Saxony, Germany.

== History ==
The district was established by merging the former districts Zwickauer Land, Chemnitzer Land and the urban district Zwickau as part of the district reform of August 2008.

== Geography ==
The district is located in the northern foothills of the Ore Mountains, west of Chemnitz. The main rivers of the district are the Zwickauer Mulde and the Pleiße. It borders (from the west and clockwise) the state Thuringia, the district Mittelsachsen, the urban district Chemnitz, and the districts Erzgebirgskreis and Vogtlandkreis.

== Towns and municipalities ==
Clickable map of towns and municipalities in the district

=== Towns ===
1. Crimmitschau
2. Glauchau
3. Hartenstein
4. Hohenstein-Ernstthal
5. Kirchberg
6. Lichtenstein
7. Limbach-Oberfrohna
8. Meerane
9. Oberlungwitz
10. Waldenburg
11. Werdau
12. Wildenfels
13. Wilkau-Haßlau
14. Zwickau

=== Municipalities ===
1. Bernsdorf
2. Callenberg
3. Crinitzberg
4. Dennheritz
5. Fraureuth
6. Gersdorf
7. Hartmannsdorf bei Kirchberg
8. Hirschfeld
9. Langenbernsdorf
10. Langenweißbach
11. Lichtentanne
12. Mülsen
13. Neukirchen
14. Niederfrohna
15. Oberwiera
16. Reinsdorf
17. Remse
18. Sankt Egidien
19. Schönberg
