= Werdau =

Town in Saxony, Germany

- Town
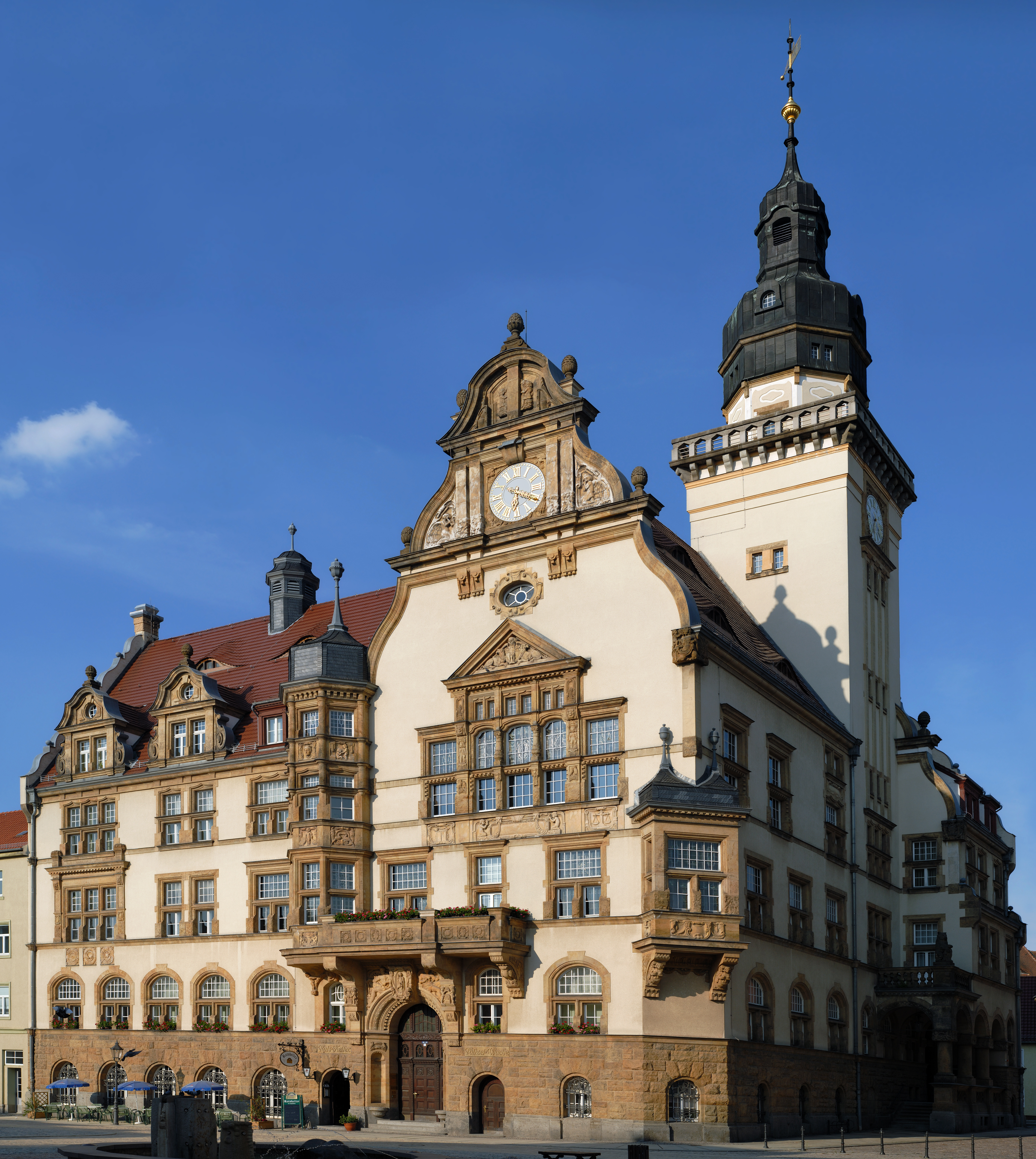
- The town hall in Werdau, built in 1911

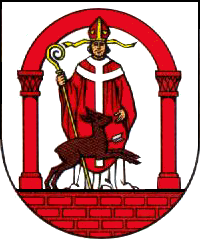
- Coat of arms

- Location of Werdau within Zwickau district
- Interactive map of Werdau
- Location within Germany Location within Saxony
- Coordinates: 50°44′N 12°23′E
- Country: Germany
- State: Saxony
- District: Zwickau
- Subdivisions: 5

Government
  - Mayor (2019–26): Sören Kristensen (Ind.)

Area
  - Total: 65.63 km^{2} (25.34 sq mi)
- Elevation: 334 m (1,096 ft)

Population (2025-12-31)
  - Total: 20,209
  - Density: 307.9/km^{2} (797.5/sq mi)
- Time zone: UTC+01:00 (CET)
  - Summer (DST): UTC+02:00 (CEST)
- Postal codes: 08412
- Dialling codes: 03761
- Vehicle registration: Z, GC, HOT, WDA
- Website: www.werdau.de

Werdau (German pronunciation: [ˈvɛʁdaʊ]) is a town in Germany, part of the Landkreis Zwickau in Saxony. It is situated on the river Pleiße, 8 km from Zwickau.

The town was mentioned as early as 1304, and in 1398 it was purchased by Frederick, then margrave of Meissen, who afterwards became Elector of Saxony.

The textile industry was the dominant industry in Werdau since the 14th century. The industrial character of the town further increased in the 20th century with the large-scale truck production by the IFA conglomerate. Both industries were not competitive after the German reunification in 1990, leading to a sharp deindustrialisation. The character of the town changed dramatically over the last 20 years after almost all factories were demolished and the characteristic East-German residential Plattenbauten were scaled back.

In 1905, the city held a contest for the design of a new town hall, as the old one built in 1727 had become too small. The tower and floorplan of one design was combined with the façade of another, and ground was broken for construction on 1 August 1908. It was inaugurated on 26 April 1911, with Frederick Augustus III of Saxony in attendance.

Werdau station is located on the Leipzig–Hof railway.

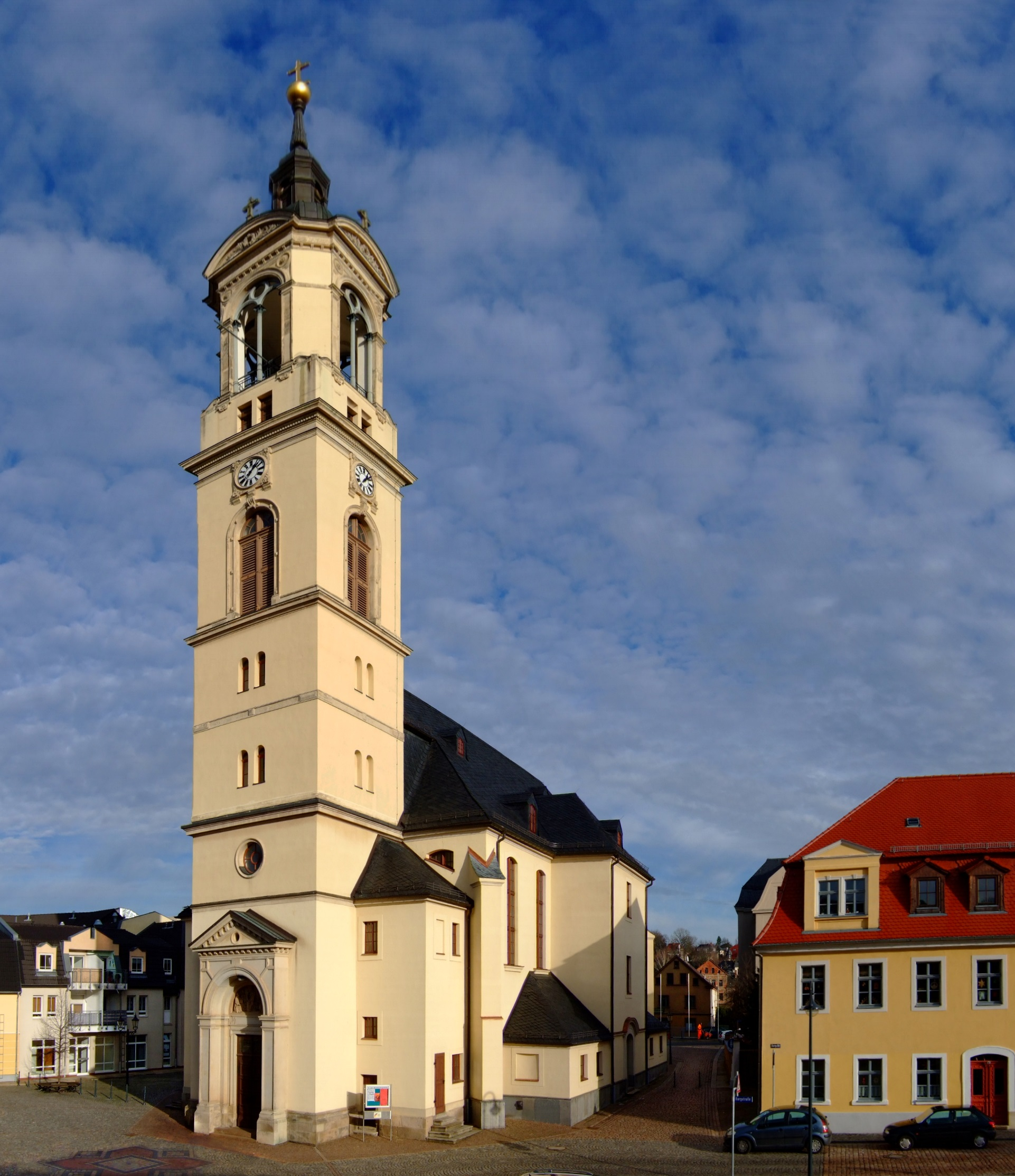
Marien-Church

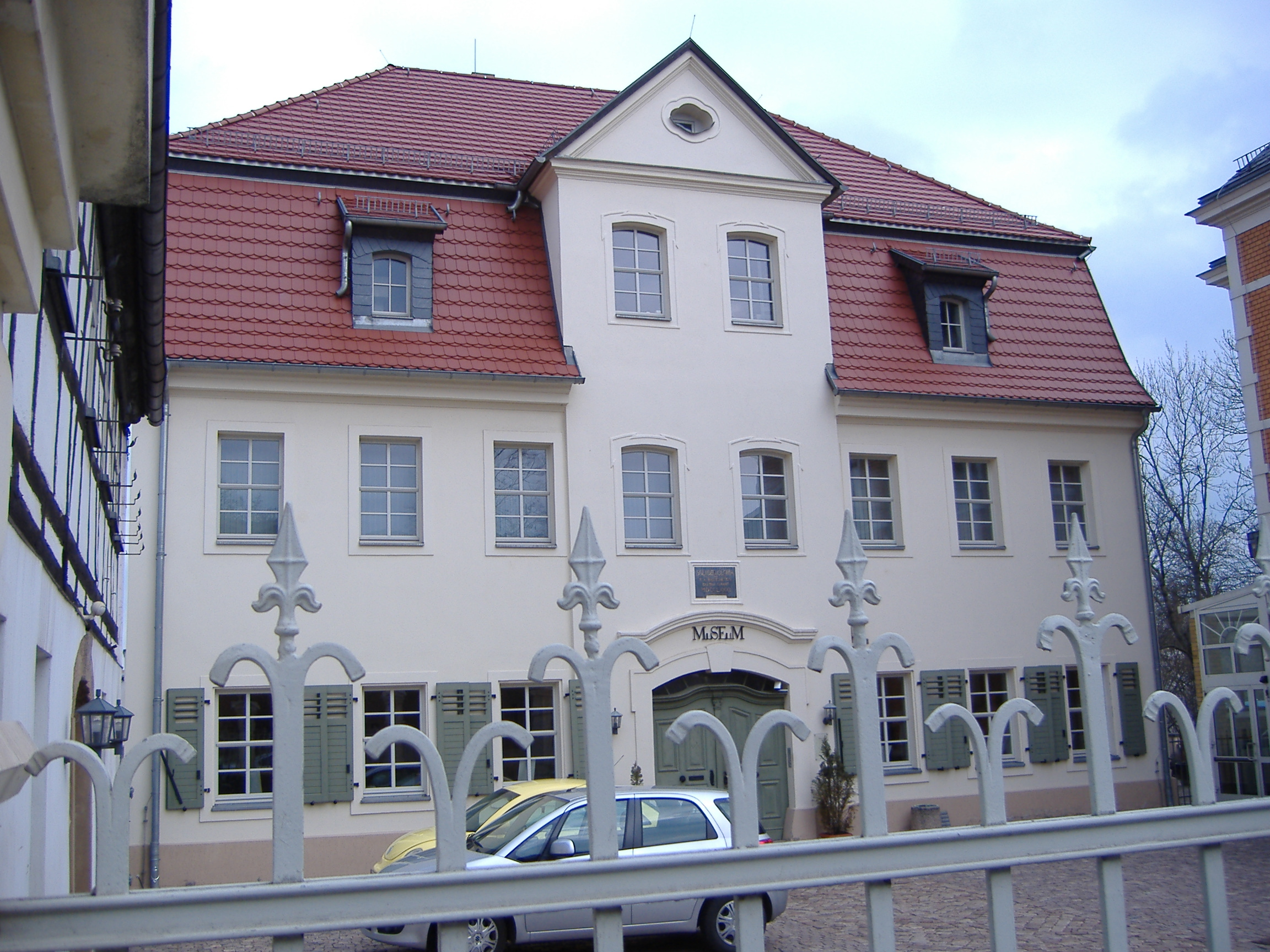
City Museum

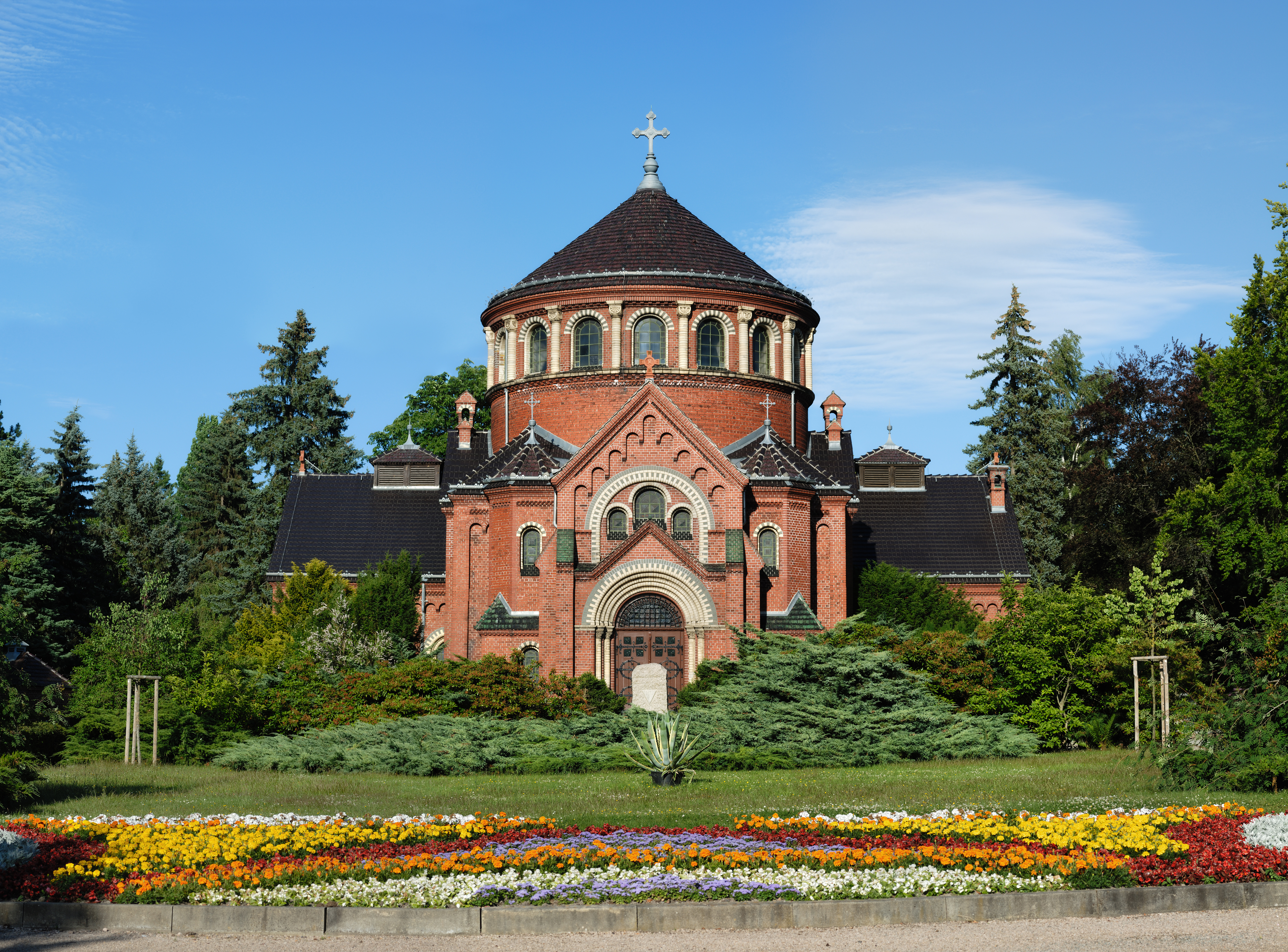
Cemetery chapel

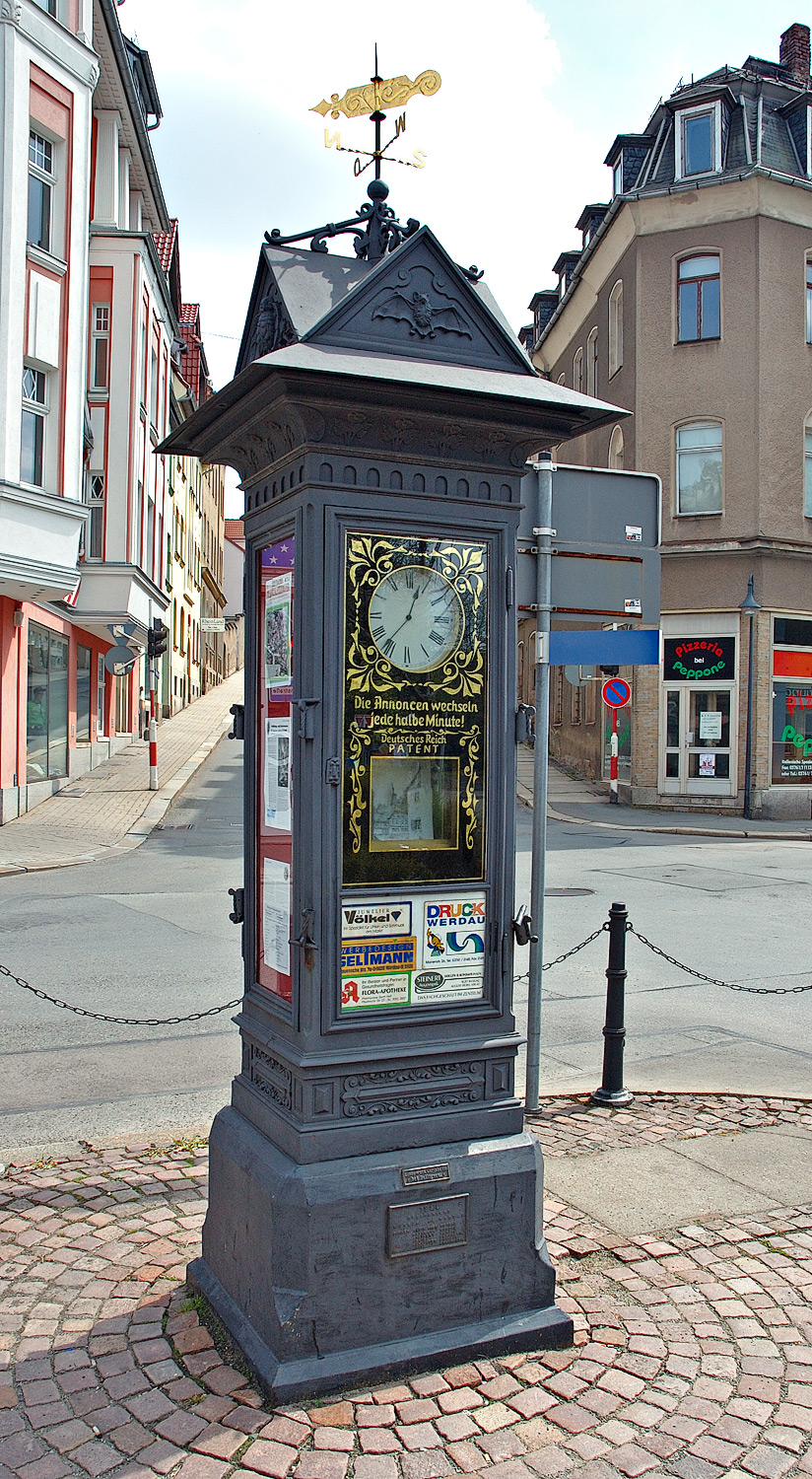
Advertising clock

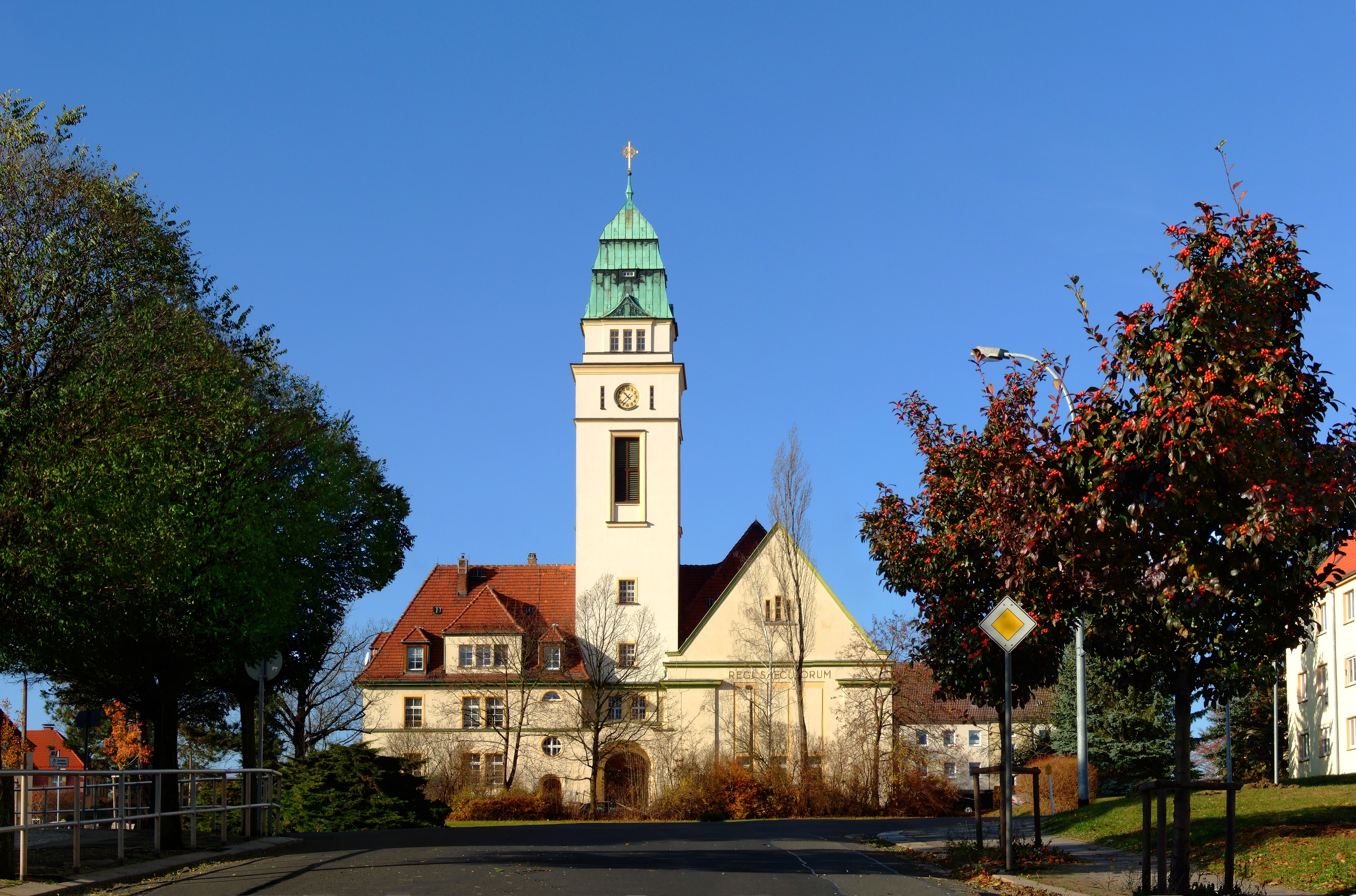
Catholic Church
