= Glauchau =

Town in Saxony, Germany

- Town
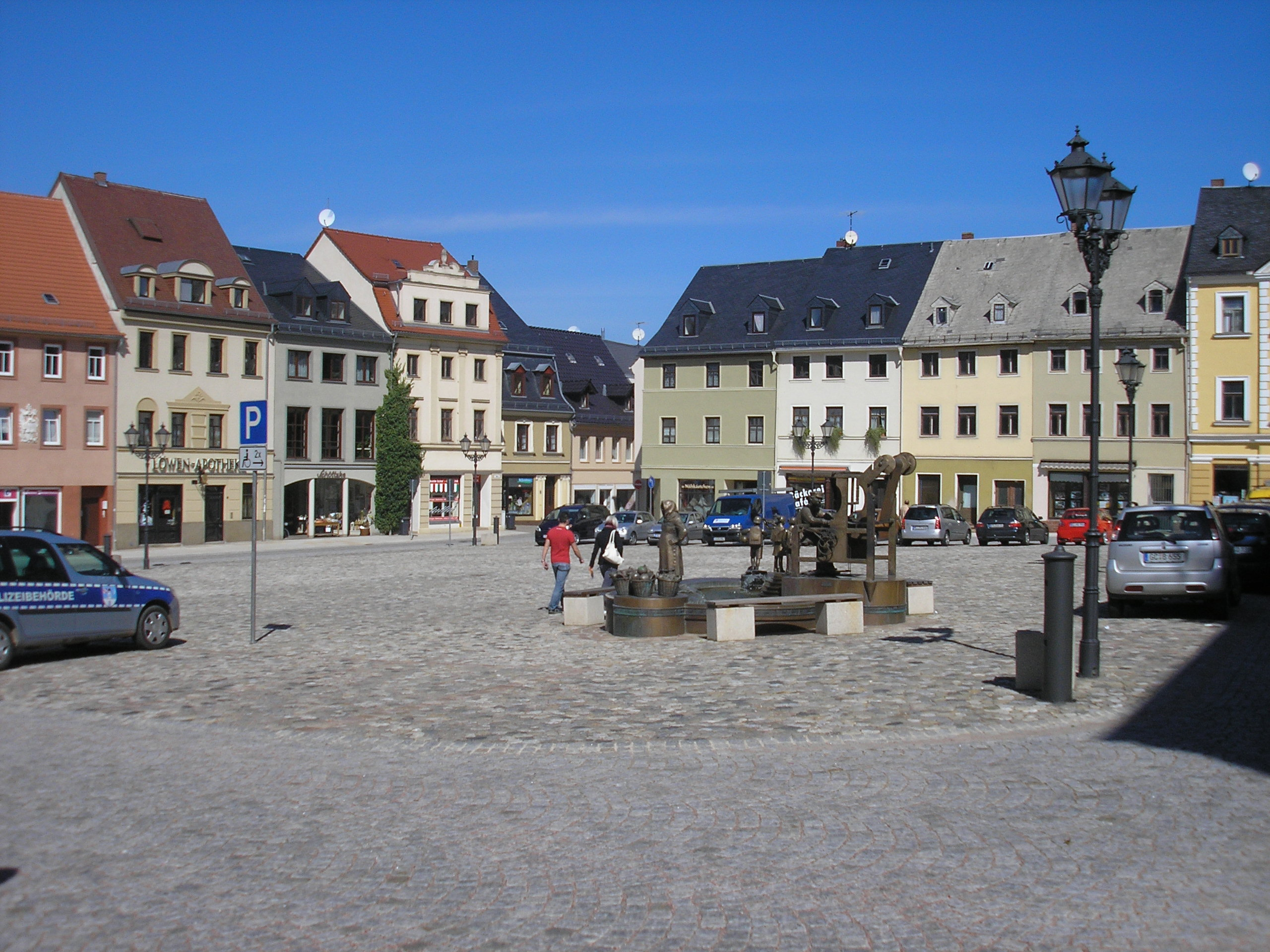
- Market

- Coat of arms

- Location of Glauchau within Zwickau district
- Interactive map of Glauchau
- Location within Germany Location within Saxony
- Coordinates: 50°49′24″N 12°32′40″E
- Country: Germany
- State: Saxony
- District: Zwickau
- Subdivisions: 7

Government
  - Mayor (2022–29): Marcus Steinhart (CDU)

Area
  - Total: 51.62 km^{2} (19.93 sq mi)
- Elevation: 266 m (873 ft)

Population (2025-12-31)
  - Total: 21,341
  - Density: 413.4/km^{2} (1,071/sq mi)
- Time zone: UTC+01:00 (CET)
  - Summer (DST): UTC+02:00 (CEST)
- Postal codes: 08371
- Dialling codes: 03763
- Vehicle registration: Z, GC
- Website: www.glauchau.de

Glauchau (German pronunciation: [ˈɡlaʊxaʊ]; Upper Sorbian: Hłuchow, pronounced [ˈhwuxɔf]) is a town in the German federal state of Saxony, on the right bank of the Mulde, 7 miles north of Zwickau and 17 miles west of Chemnitz by rail (its train station is on the Dresden–Werdau line). It is part of the Zwickau district.

== History ==
Glauchau was founded by a colony of Sorbs and Wends, and belonged to the lords of Schönburg as early as the 12th century.

== Sights ==
Some portions of the extensive old castle date from the 12th century, and the Gottesacker church contains interesting antiquarian relics.

== Notable people ==
- Johann Pfeffinger (1493–1573), theologian and Protest reformer
- Georg Agricola (1494–1555), scholar and scientist
- Samuel von Pufendorf (1632–1694), jurist, economist and historian
- Ernst Friedrich Germar (1786–1853), professor of mineralogy, entomologist and local politician
- Julius Heinrich Petermann (1801–1876), Orientalist
- Ernst Kals (1905–1979), submarine commander
- Walter Schlesinger (1908–1984), historian
- Joachim, Count of Schönburg-Glauchau (1929–1998), politician, writer, Bundestag deputy of the CDU 1990–1994
- Dieter Erler (1939–1998), footballer
- Christine Spielberg (born 1941), discus thrower
- Torsten May (born 1969), boxer

== Twin towns – sister cities ==
Glauchau is twinned with:

- Grenay, France (1996)
- Iserlohn, Germany (1991)
- Jibou, Romania (2005)
- Lynchburg, United States (2007)
- Vermelles, France (1998)
- Zgierz, Poland (1996)

== Gallery ==
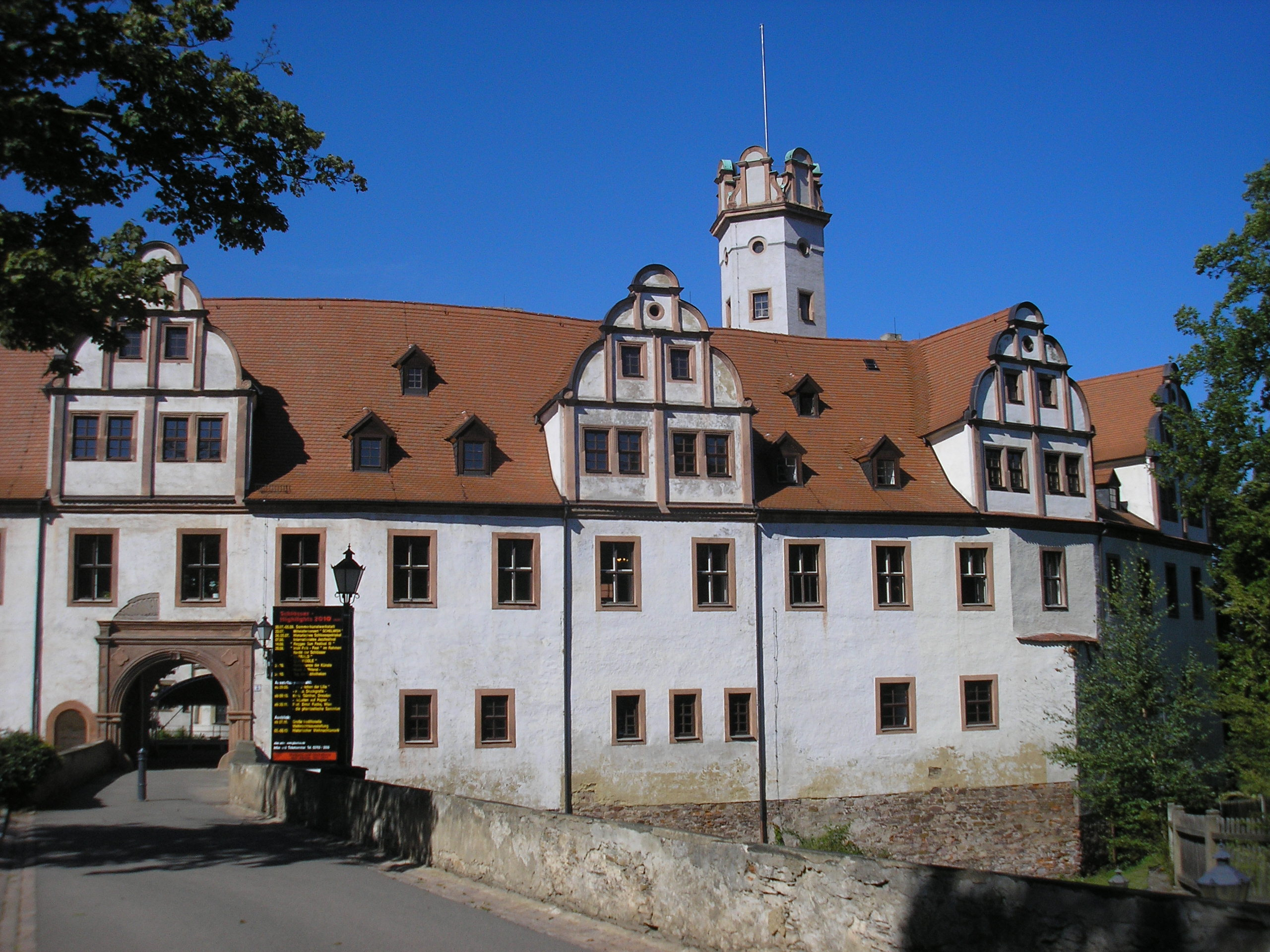
Forderglauchau Castle

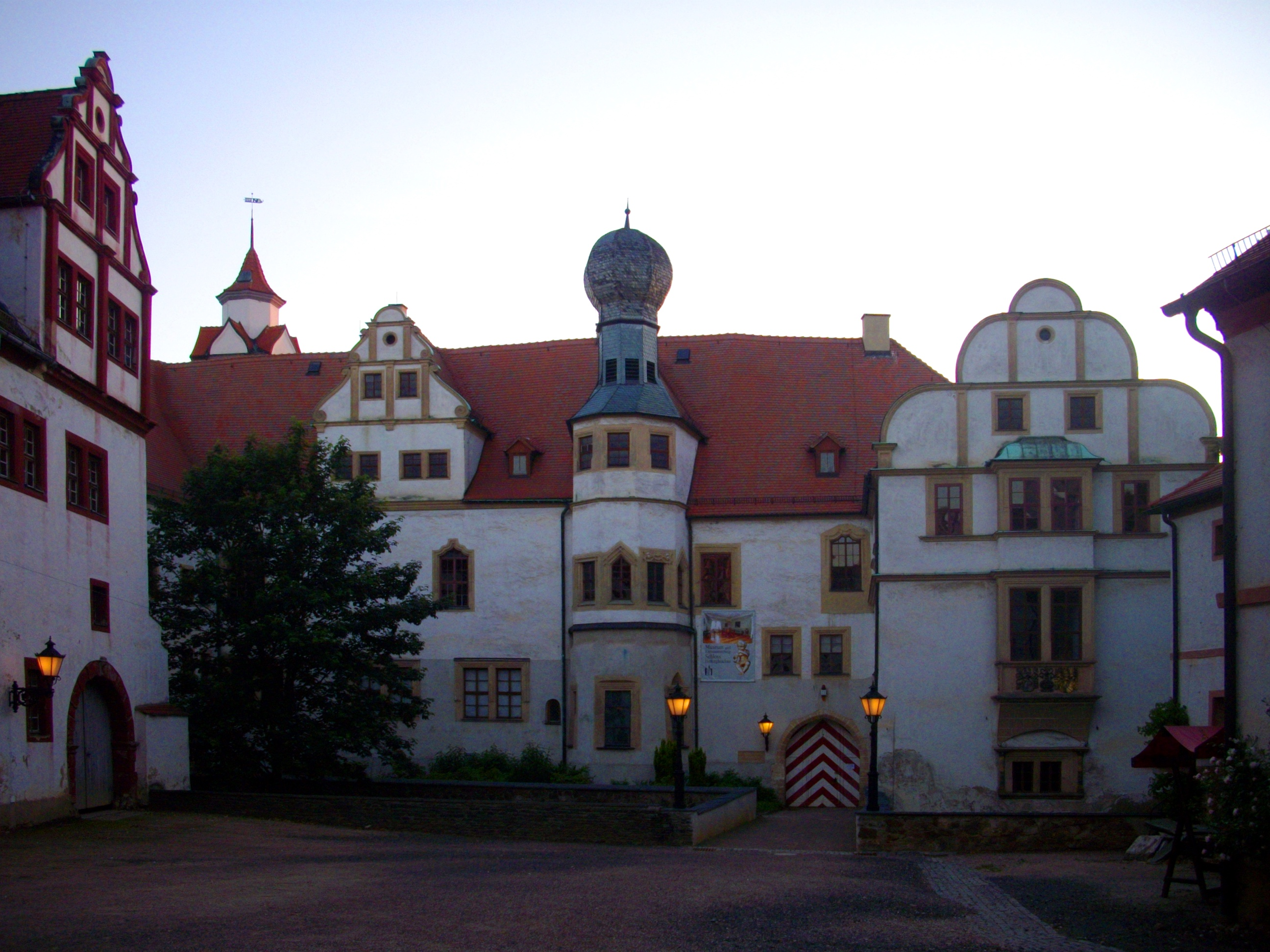
Hinterglauchau Castle

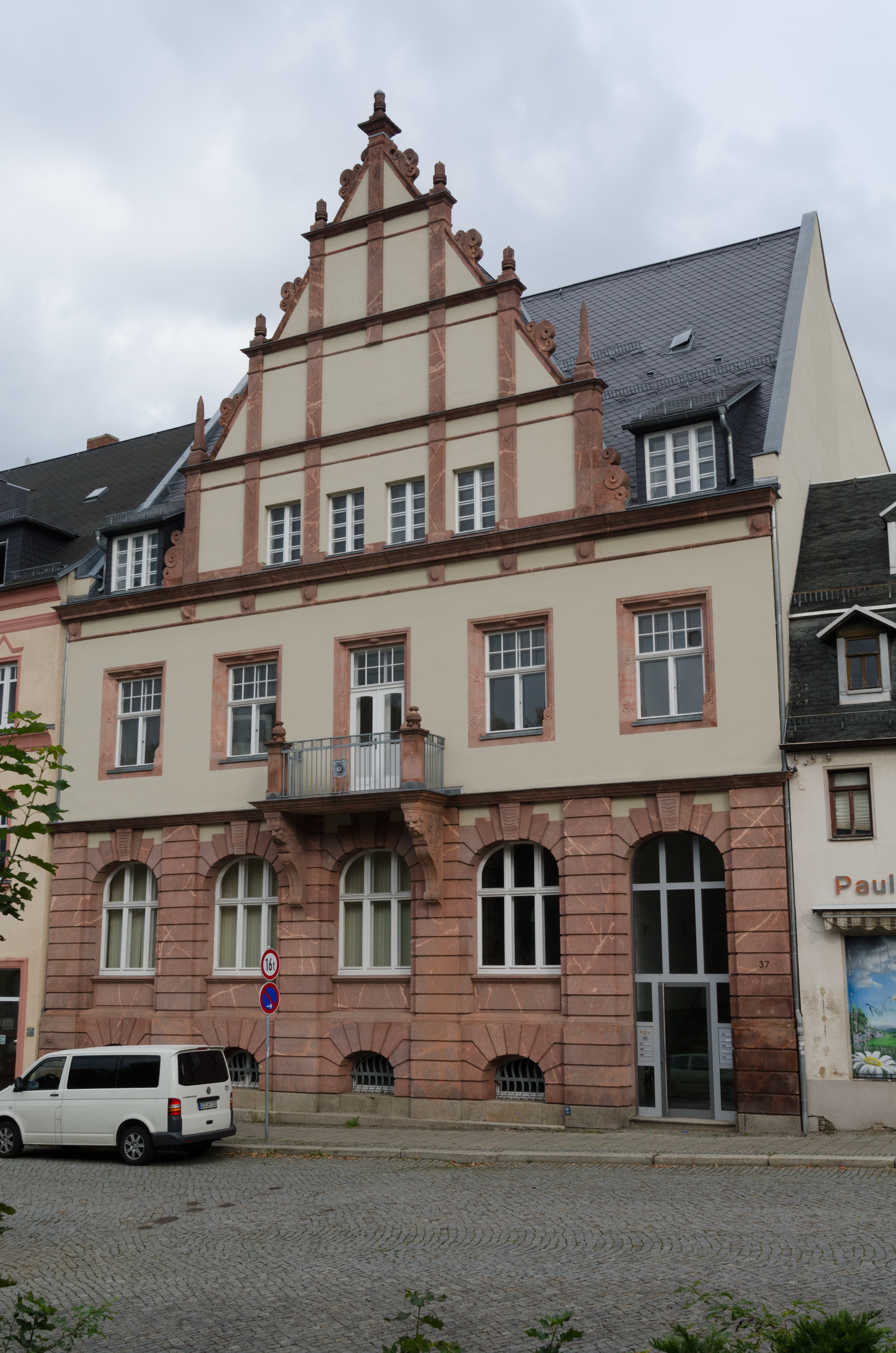
A house in Leipziger street

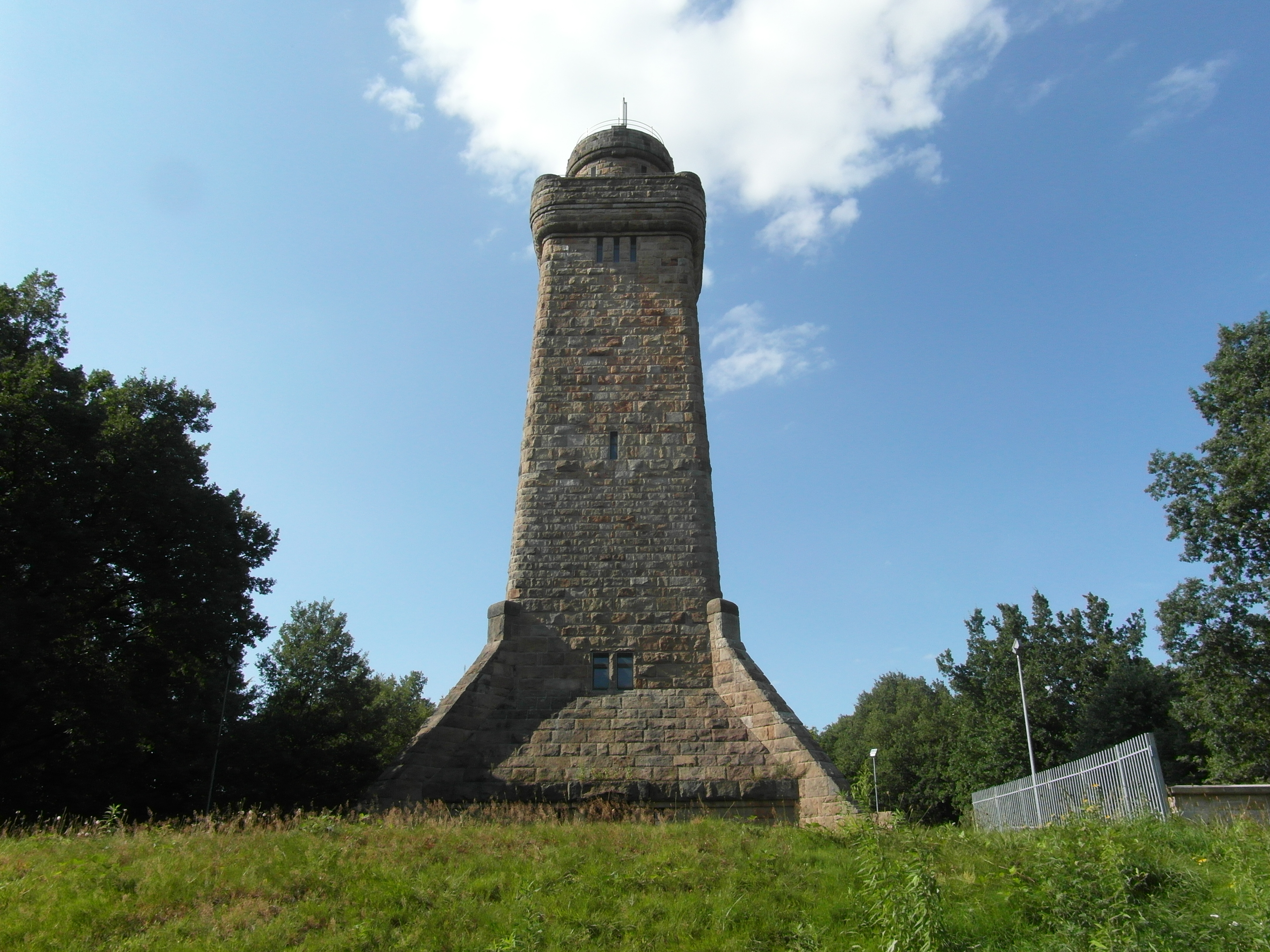
Bismarck tower

Map of Glauchau (1799)
