= Wilkau-Haßlau =

- Town
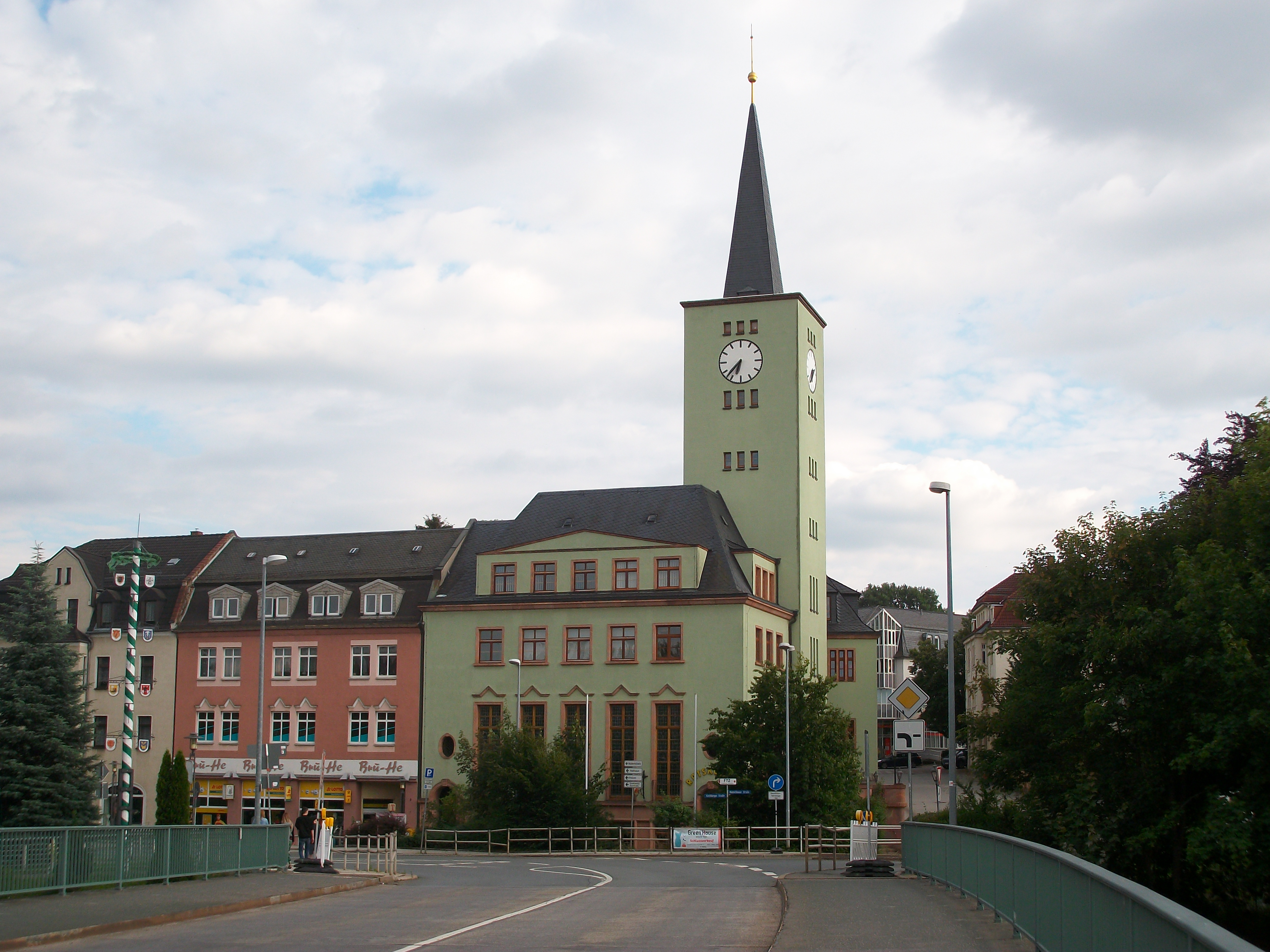
- Town hall

- Coat of arms

- Location of Wilkau-Haßlau within Zwickau district
- Interactive map of Wilkau-Haßlau
- Location within Germany Location within Saxony
- Coordinates: 50°40′N 12°31′E
- Country: Germany
- State: Saxony
- District: Zwickau

Government
  - Mayor (2019–26): Stefan Feustel (CDU)

Area
  - Total: 12.65 km^{2} (4.88 sq mi)
- Elevation: 280 m (920 ft)

Population (2025-12-31)
  - Total: 9,318
  - Density: 736.6/km^{2} (1,908/sq mi)
- Time zone: UTC+01:00 (CET)
  - Summer (DST): UTC+02:00 (CEST)
- Postal codes: 08112
- Dialling codes: 0375, 037602
- Vehicle registration: Z
- Website: www.wilkau-hasslau.de

Wilkau-Haßlau (German pronunciation: [ˈvɪlkaʊ ˈhaslaʊ]) is a town in the Zwickau district, in Saxony, Germany. It is situated on the river Zwickauer Mulde, about 6 km south of Zwickau.

== Geography ==
=== Location ===
The town lies at the foot of the Ore Mountains in a valley bowl, about 6 kilometers south of the town of Zwickau and is divided by the Zwickauer Mulde rivers and the Rödelbach stream. Left of the Mulde are the former parishes of Haara, Neuhaara, Culitzsch and Wilkau, right of the river are Oberhaßlau, Niederhaßlau, Silberstraße and Rosenthal, as well as Sandberg, only settled in recent decades, which was formed by the division of the parish of Bockwa.

=== Neighbouring municipalities ===
Its neighbouring municipalities are Hirschfeld and Reinsdorf and the towns of Kirchberg, Wildenfels and Zwickau in the district of Zwickau.

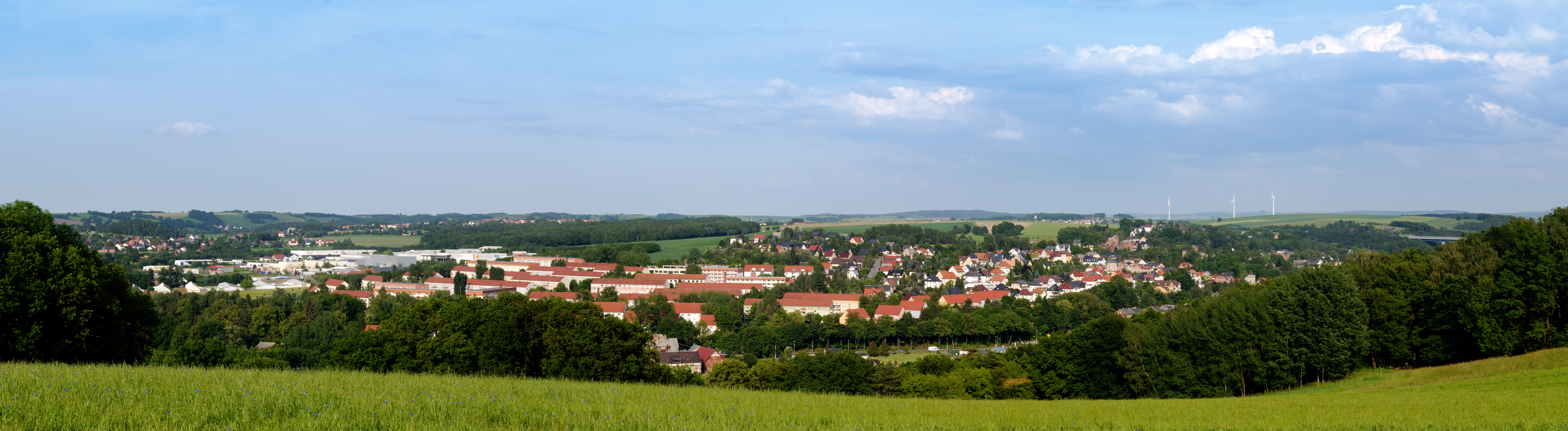
Wilkau-Haßlau
