= Silberstraße =

Silberstraße may refer to:

- Silver Road (German:Silberstraße), a tourist route in Saxony, Germany
- Silberstraße (Wilkau-Haßlau), a village in Saxony, Germany
