= De Haar =

De Haar is the name of several villages and hamlets in the Netherlands:

- De Haar (Coevorden), Drenthe
- De Haar (Hoogeveen), Drenthe
- De Haar (Assen), Drenthe
- De Haar (Groningen)
- De Haar (Gelderland)
- De Haar (Overijssel)
- Haarzuilens, Utrecht; formerly "De Haar"
  - Castle De Haar in Haarzuilens
