= Siege of Coevorden =

Siege of Coevorden may refer to:

- Siege of Coevorden (1592)
- Siege of Coevorden (1593)
