= Haar =

Haar may refer to:

- Haar (fog), fog or sea mist (Scottish English)
- Haar, Bavaria, a city near Munich, Germany
- Haar (Westphalia), a hill range in North Rhine-Westphalia, Germany

== People with the surname ==
- Alfréd Haar (1885–1933), Hungarian mathematician
- Jarrod Haar, New Zealand organisational psychology academic

== See also ==
- De Haar (disambiguation)
- Haar wavelet, the first wavelet
- Haar measure, a set-theoretic measure
- Haar-like feature, a technique in computer vision
- Haarr, people named Haarr
