= Silver Road =

Historical holiday route in Germany

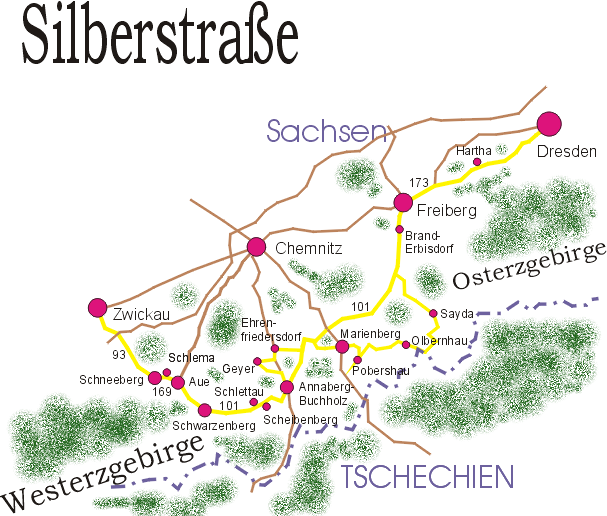
Map of the Silver Road

The 140-kilometre-long Silver Road (German: Silberstraße, pronounced [ˈzɪlbɐˌʃtʁaːsə]) is the first and longest holiday route in the German Free State of Saxony. Against the background of the importance of mining in the history of Saxony, the road links those sights and tourist attractions of the Ore Mountains and its foreland that relate to the centuries-old mining and smelting industries of the region.

== Background ==
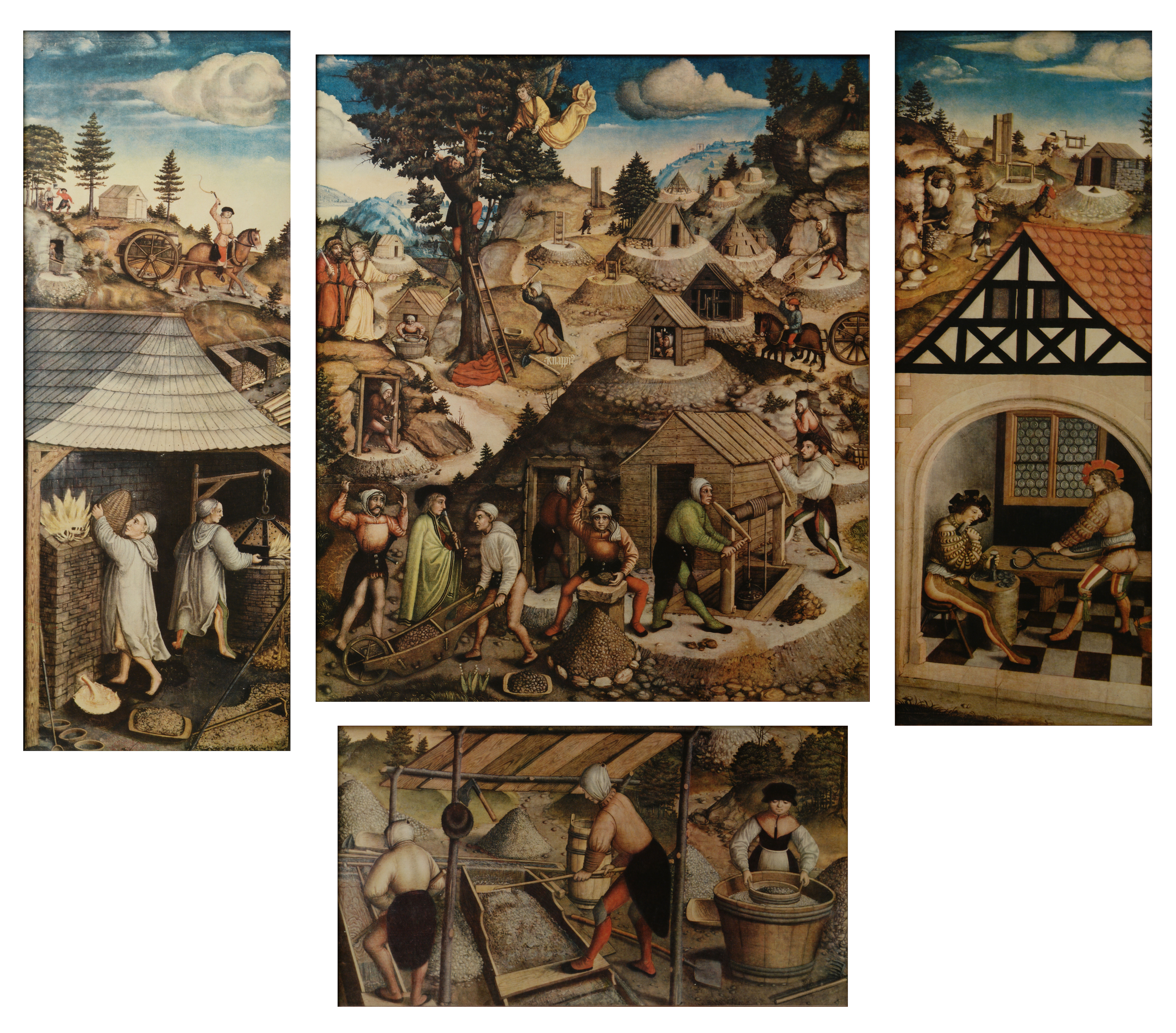
Mining altar in St. Anne's Church, Annaberg-Buchholz

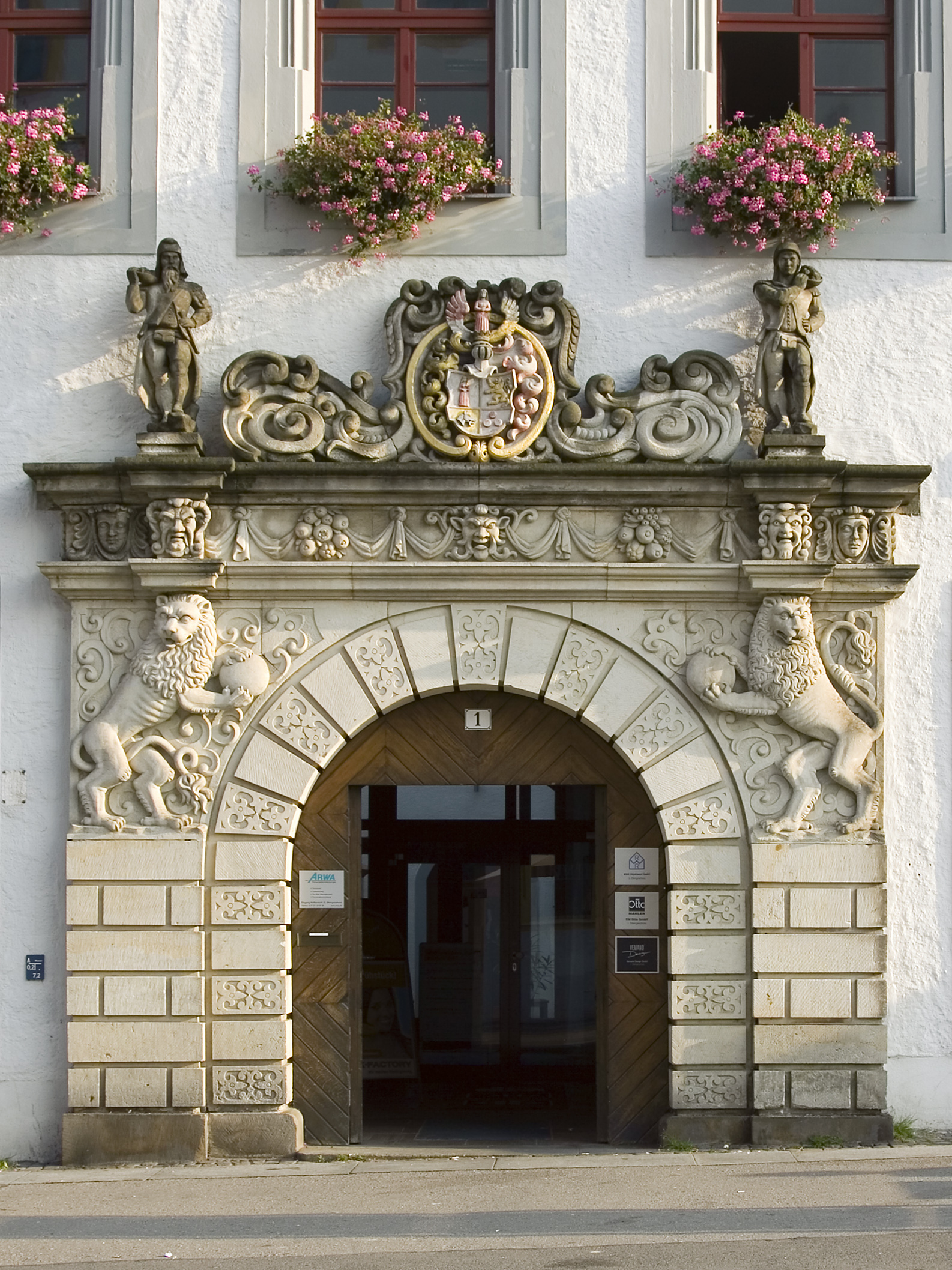
Portal in Freiberg

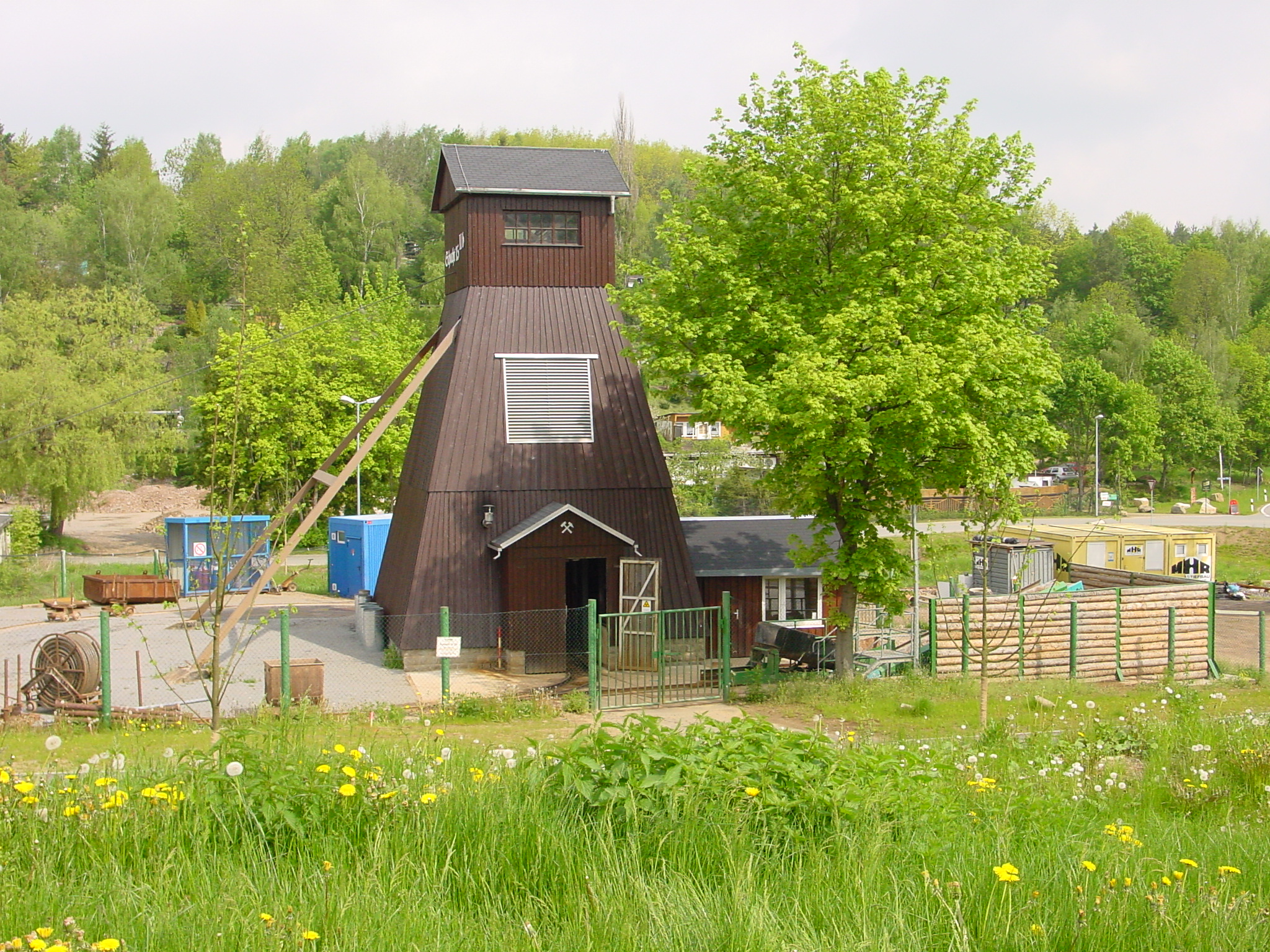
Visitor mine of Markus Semmler Stolln in Bad Schlema

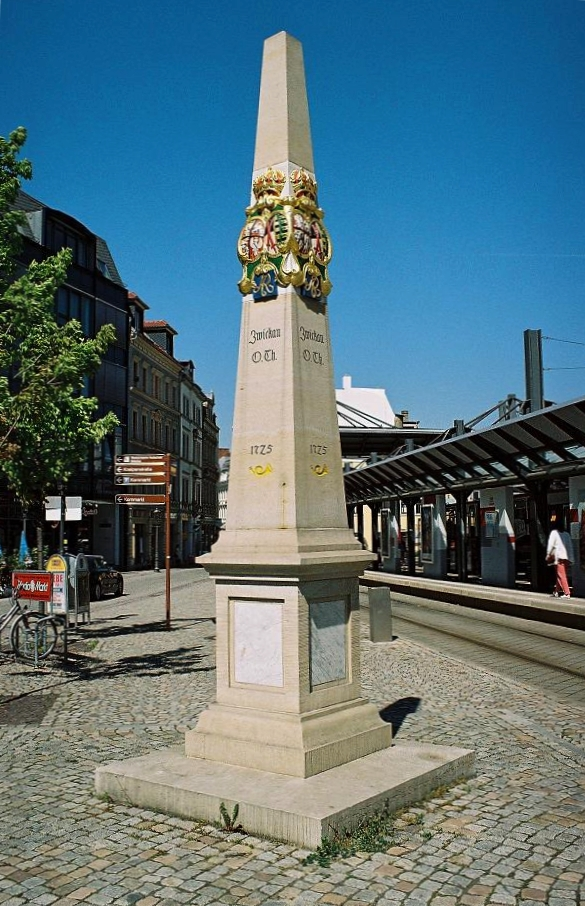
Post milestone at Zwickau, Obertor—start of the Silver Road

Mining in the Ore Mountains has a history reaching back more than 800 years. At the outset this was dominated especially by silver mining, its supplier industries and shareholders. Mines, smelters and mints emerged, which in turn gave rise to traditions and customs, many of which survive to the present day. Several technological monuments, especially show mines and hammer mills, that characterise the highlands and the way of life in the Ore Mountain region, led to the development of the tourist route.

The present day Silver Road recalls the historic ore transport routes—the Silver Wagon Way (Silberwagenweg) from Annaberg-Buchholz via Wolkenstein, Lengefeld and Brand-Erbisdorf to Freiberg and the old Silver Road (Silberstraße) from Scharfenberg to Freiberg. It symbolises the silver routes from the silver mines in the Ore Mountains to the ore preparation sites, and along the course of the historic Prince's Way through the Tharandt Forest to Dresden to the Grünes Gewölbe, the treasure house of the royal Wettin family.

== Route ==
Beginning in Zwickau the Silver Road runs through the mining town of Schneeberg, the towns of Aue, Schwarzenberg, the mining towns of Annaberg-Buchholz, Ehrenfriedersdorf, Wolkenstein, Marienberg, Lengefeld, Sayda and Brand-Erbisdorf to Freiberg and from thence continues to the Saxon state capital of Dresden.

The route coincides roughly with that of the B 93, B 169, B 101, B 171 and B 173 federal roads as well as the S 194 state road. Southeast of Zwickau, it runs through the eponymous village of Silberstraße. Between Annaberg and Lengefeld and between the Brand-Erbisdorf and Freiberg, it also follows in places the course of the so-called Silver Wagon Way (Silberwagenweg), an old post and trade route. Likewise, between Freiberg and Naundorf, it follow the route of the historic Silver Road (Silberstraße) that ran from Scharfenberg on the River Elbe to Freiberg, and in the direction of Dresden it also follows the old Prince's Way (Fürstenweg) through the Tharandt Forest. From Zwickau to Dresden, the Silver Road is accompanied by the Silver Road Cycle Path.

== Sights ==
The Silver Road opens up to the public the numerous physical relics of Saxony's mining past, including for example the Reiche Zeche and Alte Elisabeth Educational and Research Mine, the Dorfchemnitz Iron Hammer Mill and Frohnauer Hammer.

Many Late Gothic hall churches (e.g. St Wolfgang's, St Anne's, St Mary's, Freiberg Cathedral), Saxon Renaissance buildings and a great number of local churches with works of art in terms of architecture, painting, sculpture and church organ building (Gottfried Silbermann) demonstrate the wealth of the former mining region. In the old royal capital of Saxony, Dresden, the proceeds of the silver mining contributed to a significant proportion of the investment in the Dresden State Art Collections and in architectural monuments.

The Silver Road holiday route is a very good start to get to know the Ore Mountains. The road is signed with a silver "S" and, in places, is identical to the German Avenue Road.

Many of the events along the Silver Road offer an insight into miners' parades, Christmas traditions and folklore. In the fields of crafts and handicrafts, the region is particularly well known for its wood carving, bobbin lace and pewter as well as the manufacture of the world-renowned Christmas pyramids, nativity scenes, nutcrackers, smoking figures and other Ore Mountain folk art.

== See also ==
- Silver Way

== Literature ==
- Harry Beyrich: Eine Touristenstraße durch das Silberne Erzgebirge. In: Sächsische Heimatblätter, Heft 5/1991, pp. 316.
- Harry Beyrich: Die Erzgebirgische Silberstraße. In: Mitteilungen des Landesvereins Sächsischer Heimatschutz, Heft 1/1993, pp. 8–17.
- Tourismusverband Erzgebirge: Erlebnis Bergbau entlang der Silberstraße. Annaberg-Buchholz, 2007.
- Horst Ziethen: Entdeckungsreise durch das Erzgebirge. Eine idyllische Mittelgebirgsreise ins Weihnachtsland und entlang der Silberstraße. Ziethen-Panorama-Verlag, Bad Münstereifel, 2005, ISBN 3-934328-93-8.
