= Silver Route =

Silver Route may refer to the:

- Camino Real de Tierra Adentro, the Spanish silver road in Mexico and North America.
- Silver Road, a historical holiday route in Germany
- Vía de la Plata, an ancient commercial and pilgrimage road in Spain
