= Haara =

Haara may refer to:

== People with the surname ==
- Ben Te Haara (1932–2021), Māori Anglican bishop
- Heikki Haara (born 1982), Finnish former football player
- Magnus Haara (born 1972), Swedish politician
- Taito Haara (born 1942), Finnish weightlifter

== Other uses ==
- Muthina Haara, 1990 Indian film
- Haara Dil, 2018 Pakistani television series
- Kaun Jeeta Kaun Haara, 1987 Indian film
- Koi Jeeta Koi Haara, 1976 Bollywood drama film
- Haara Kotiya, 2017 Sri Lankan mystery thriller

== See also ==
- Hara
- Haar
