= Siege of Coevorden (1593) =

Part of the Eighty Years' War and the Anglo–Spanish War

Siege of Coevorden (1593–94)
- Part of the Eighty Years' War & the Anglo–Spanish War
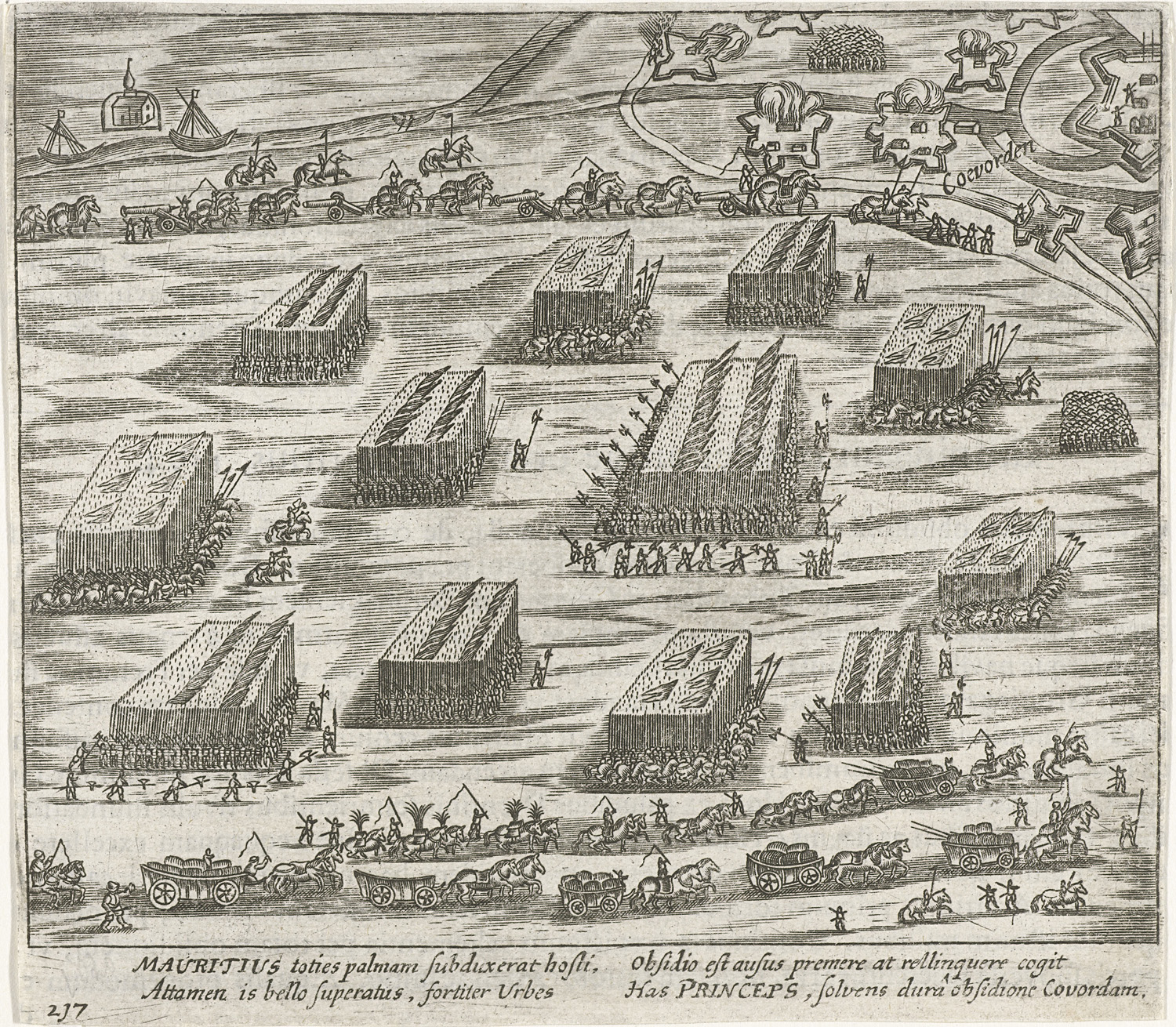
- Relief of Coevorden by Maurice of Orange, 1594
Date	28 October 1593 – 6 May 1594
Location	Coevorden; Present day the Netherlands
Result	Dutch and English victory

Belligerents
Dutch Republic; Kingdom of England	(Spain) Spanish Empire

Commanders and leaders
(Dutch Republic) Maurice of Orange (England) Francis Vere (Dutch Republic) Caspar van Eussum (Coevorden)	(Spain) Francisco Verdugo (Spain) Herman van den Bergh

Strength
12,000 infantry 2,000 cavalry	8,000

Casualties and losses
Light	Heavy

The siege of Coevorden was a thirty-one-week siege of the city of Coevorden in the province of Drenthe by the Spanish general Francisco Verdugo during the Eighty Years' War and the Anglo–Spanish War. The siege first commenced in October 1593, but winter and shortages of food and supplies forced the Spanish into winter quarters. The siege however recommenced in March 1594, but on May 6 Maurice of Orange arrived with an Anglo-Dutch army to relieve Coevorden, forcing the Spanish army under Francisco Verdugo to retreat.

== Background ==
The Spanish Army of Flanders had been hampered in its effort to overcome Dutch resistance. When the Spanish forces were committed in France to halt the collapse of the Catholic League; Dutch and English forces under the command of Maurice of Nassau and Francis Vere respectively went on the offensive. Maurice adopted the same tactics as the Duke of Parma, by creating defensible barriers and zones of control. This resulted in many towns and regions falling into Anglo-Dutch hands throughout the 1590s. The city of Coevorden was one of these towns and had been captured in September 1592 which thus cut off the Spaniards eastern supply line to Groningen. The following year the capture of Geertruidenberg cut off Groningen further. The Spanish Stadtholder in the region Francisco Verdugo noted that Coevorden was crucial to Spanish rule in the northern Netherlands. It was also important for the Spanish stranglehold in Drenthe therefore he was committed to retaking it. Beginning in 1593, Verdugo launched his campaign and struck from Groenlo and occupied the small town of Gramsbergen, building small forts and establishing positions in Emlichheim and Dalen.

Verdugo constructed a road through Drenthe into Bentheim and Schoonebeek.The construction of the road however was prevented further by William Louis, Count of Nassau at which point the road was destroyed and blocked off. At the same time in Coevorden the garrison there led by governor Caspar van Eussum made precautions and stocked up; ammunition and food were quickly despatched and brought into Coevorden for the anticipation of a Spanish siege.

== Campaign ==
=== First siege ===
Verdugo's forces marched to Coevorden via the Bruges Essche road in October 1593. The Spaniards thereon laid a dike via Klooster to De Haar establishing a tight blockade. Verdugo however was not familiar with the climate of Coevorden, and as well as a lack of fuel and food, disease took hold of the Spanish camp - many soldiers of which succumbed to. In addition, a great many deserted; one company shrank from 500 to 100 men. Soldiers who were looking for fuel and food then brought disease to the surrounding villages where whole families were infected and died. The garrison however was well supplied and the defences were strong - the blockade took no effect but cost Verdugo's force dearly.

Verdugo realised by November that he had neither the munitions nor provisions for a long siege. Winter was coming and Verdugo had no choice but to retire from the fortress, the States forces were aware of this, but thought it was unnecessary to interfere with the Spanish retirement. They too went into winter quarters.

=== Second siege ===
Although the Spanish went into winter quarters, a tight blockade was put on Coevorden. Despite this, supplies still managed to get through, as well as reinforcements.

In March 1594 Verdugo appeared before Coevorden with 8,000 troops, including 2,000 cavalry. Having surrounded the city, they demanded the surrender, but this was rejected by Van Eussum. He hoped for relief soon, but at the same time the Spanish dug siege positions and installed bastions around the key positions.

=== Relief ===
On hearing of the news of Verdugo's siege, Maurice with his force (which included twelve companies of English and ten Scots totalling 5,000 troops under Francis Vere) quickly moved from Zwolle and marched his force to Coevorden. Count William Louis, with his thirteen companies of Frisians, had fortified the area known as the Bourtange Marsh so that Maurice could move in quickly and take Verdugo at a disadvantage. William Louis soon joined Maurice and Vere on the road between Vecht and the Bourtange marsh totalling 9,600 soldiers and 1,900 cavalry.

Count Philip of Hohenlohe-Neuenstein was sent with twenty Dutch companies to cover the southern borders against Verdugo's army of reinforcements under Frederik and Herman van den Bergh of which neared 8,000 men. Meanwhile, Maurice's forces soon approached Coevorden and started to dig trenches in front of the Spanish force surrounding the city. Verdugo reconnoitred the position but found the Anglo-Dutch to be impregnable and established on his line of communications. He then called a council of war and decided that to remain would result in destruction and that to attack was suicidal.

On the night of May 7, the Spanish broke camp, burning everything they didn't need and retreated from the siege works. The siege of Coevorden had ended after thirty one weeks.

== Aftermath ==
Verdugo split his force up to confuse the Anglo-Dutch if they pursued; most of his force went to Groningen while the rest headed towards Oldenzaal over the Ems river to Spanish occupied Lingen.

After the relief of the city there were then two possibilities for Maurice; the immediate siege of Groningen or to drive the Spanish from the region of Twente. The Dutch rallied behind the latter plan, but William Louis and Vere thought that strategic sense was clear in the first plan. Despite heated debates, William Louis and Vere were overruled and Groningen was eventually chosen which would lead to its capture that year.

Coevorden would remain in Dutch hands for the rest of the war.

=== Legacy ===
The dike that the Spaniards constructed during the siege is still present, and is now called the Spanjaardsdijk.

== Bibliography ==
- Black, Jeremy (2005). European Warfare, 1494–1660 Warfare and History. Routledge. ISBN 978-1134477081.
- Fissel, Mark Charles (2001). English warfare, 1511–1642; Warfare and history. London: Routledge. ISBN 978-0415214810.
- Hagedorn, Bernhard (2012). Ostfrieslands Handel und Schifffahrt 1580–1648. Books on Demand. ISBN 978-3954271764.
- T.A. Morris (2002). Europe and England in the Sixteenth Century. Routledge. ISBN 978-1134748204.
- van Nimwegen, Olaf (2010). The Dutch Army and the Military Revolutions, 1588–1688 Volume 31 of Warfare in History Series. Boydell & Brewer. ISBN 978-1843835752.
