= Haarr =

Haarr is a Norwegian surname. Notable people with the surname include:

- Elisabeth Haarr (1945–2025), Norwegian artist
- Margrethe Haarr (born 1985), Norwegian politician
