= De Haar, Hoogeveen =

Populated place near Hoogeveen

De Haar
- Hamlet
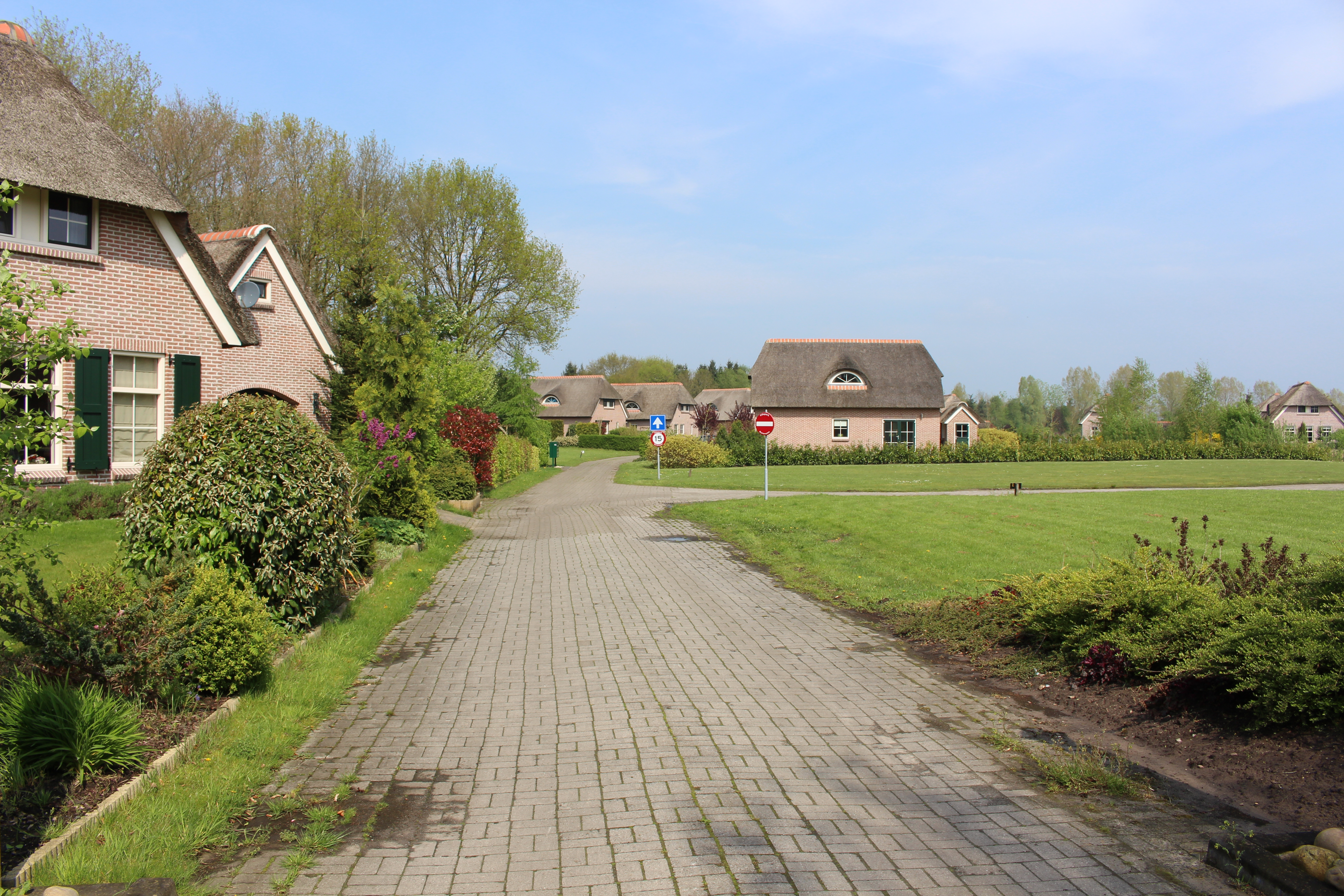
- Villa ward in De Haar

- Location in province of Drenthe in the Netherlands De Haar (Netherlands)
- Coordinates: 52.761°N 6.549°E
- Country: Netherlands
- Province: Drenthe
- Municipality: Hoogeveen
- Elevation: 15 m (49 ft)
- Time zone: UTC+1 (CET)
  - Summer (DST): UTC+2 (CEST)
- Postal code: 7936
- Dialing code: 0528

De Haar is a hamlet in the Dutch province of Drenthe. It is located in the municipality of Hoogeveen, about 7 km northeast of that town.

It was first mentioned in 1936 as Haar, and means "sandy ridge". It is considered part of Tiendeveen, and has about 85 houses.
