= Silberstraße (Wilkau-Haßlau) =

Parish in Saxony, Germany

Coordinates: 50°39′47″N 12°32′49″E

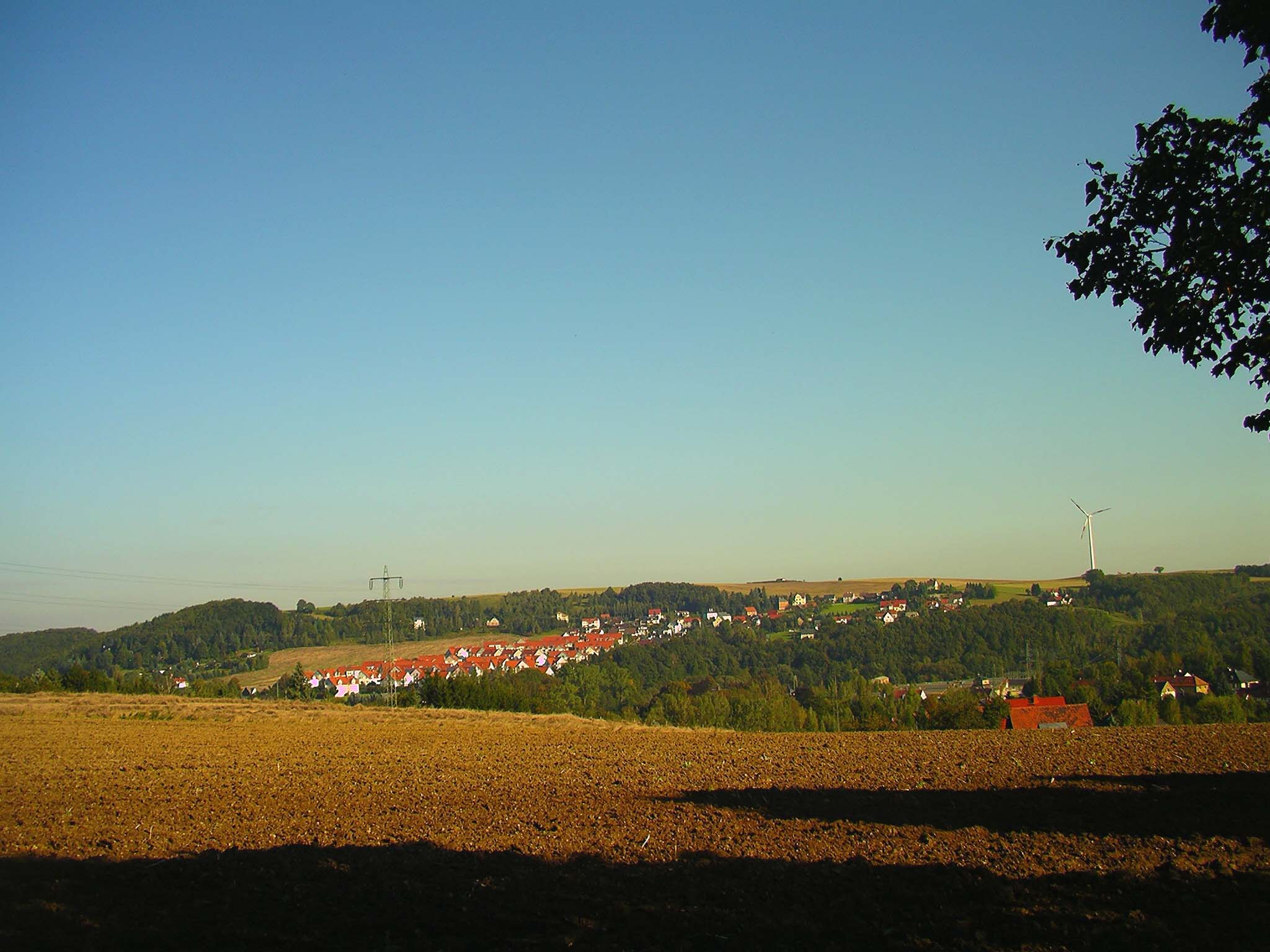
North view of Silberstraße

Silberstraße is a formerly independent parish in the German state of Saxony. Since 1999 it has been part of the borough of Wilkau-Haßlau, in the district of Zwickau. It has around 2,000 inhabitants and lies at an elevation of 340 m above sea level (NN). As well as the old village houses it also has a newly built residential area with modern housing units, large industrial estates with textile firms and agricultural concerns.

== Geography ==
=== Location ===
The village lies as the foot of the Ore Mountains in a valley basin, about 10 kilometres south of Zwickau and is divided by the Zwickauer Mulde river.

=== Neighbouring parishes ===
Its adjacent municipalities are Reinsdorf with the villages of Vielau and Friedrichsgrün, as well as the towns of Kirchberg and Wildenfels in the district of Zwickau.
