= Reinsdorf, Saxony =

Reinsdorf
- Municipality
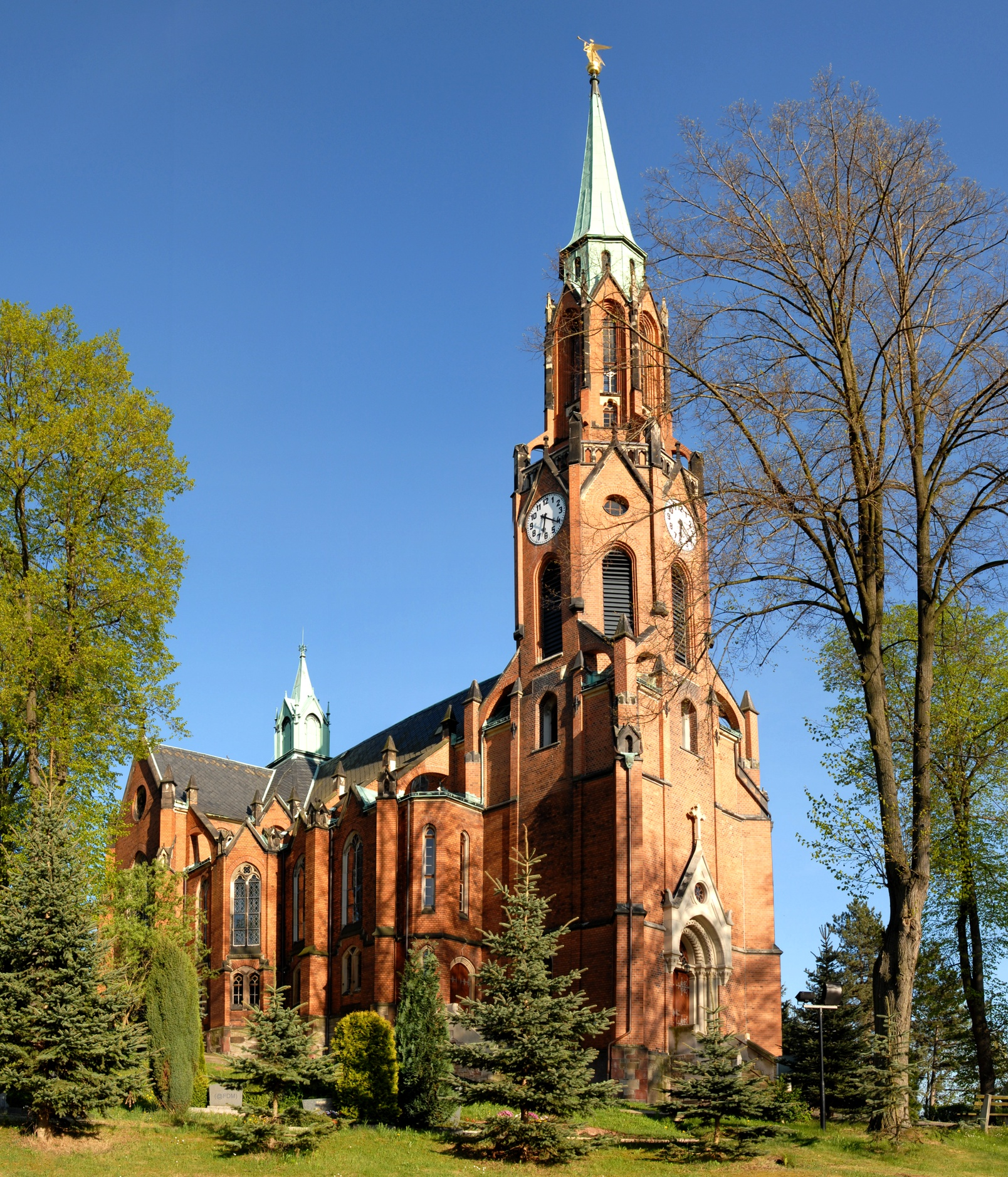
- Saint Jacob Church

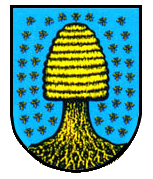
- Coat of arms

- Location of Reinsdorf within Zwickau district
- Interactive map of Reinsdorf
- Location within Germany Location within Saxony
- Coordinates: 50°41′51″N 12°33′32″E
- Country: Germany
- State: Saxony
- District: Zwickau
- Subdivisions: 3

Government
  - Mayor (2020–27): Steffen Ludwig (Ind.)

Area
  - Total: 21.25 km^{2} (8.20 sq mi)
- Elevation: 296–425 m (971–1,394 ft)

Population (2025-12-31)
  - Total: 6,962
  - Density: 327.6/km^{2} (848.5/sq mi)
- Time zone: UTC+01:00 (CET)
  - Summer (DST): UTC+02:00 (CEST)
- Postal codes: 08141
- Dialling codes: 0375
- Vehicle registration: Z
- Website: www.reinsdorf.de

Reinsdorf (German pronunciation: [ˈʁaɪnsdɔʁf]) is a municipality in the district Zwickau, in Saxony, Germany.
