= Tharandt Forest =

Coordinates: 50°57′32″N 13°29′50″E

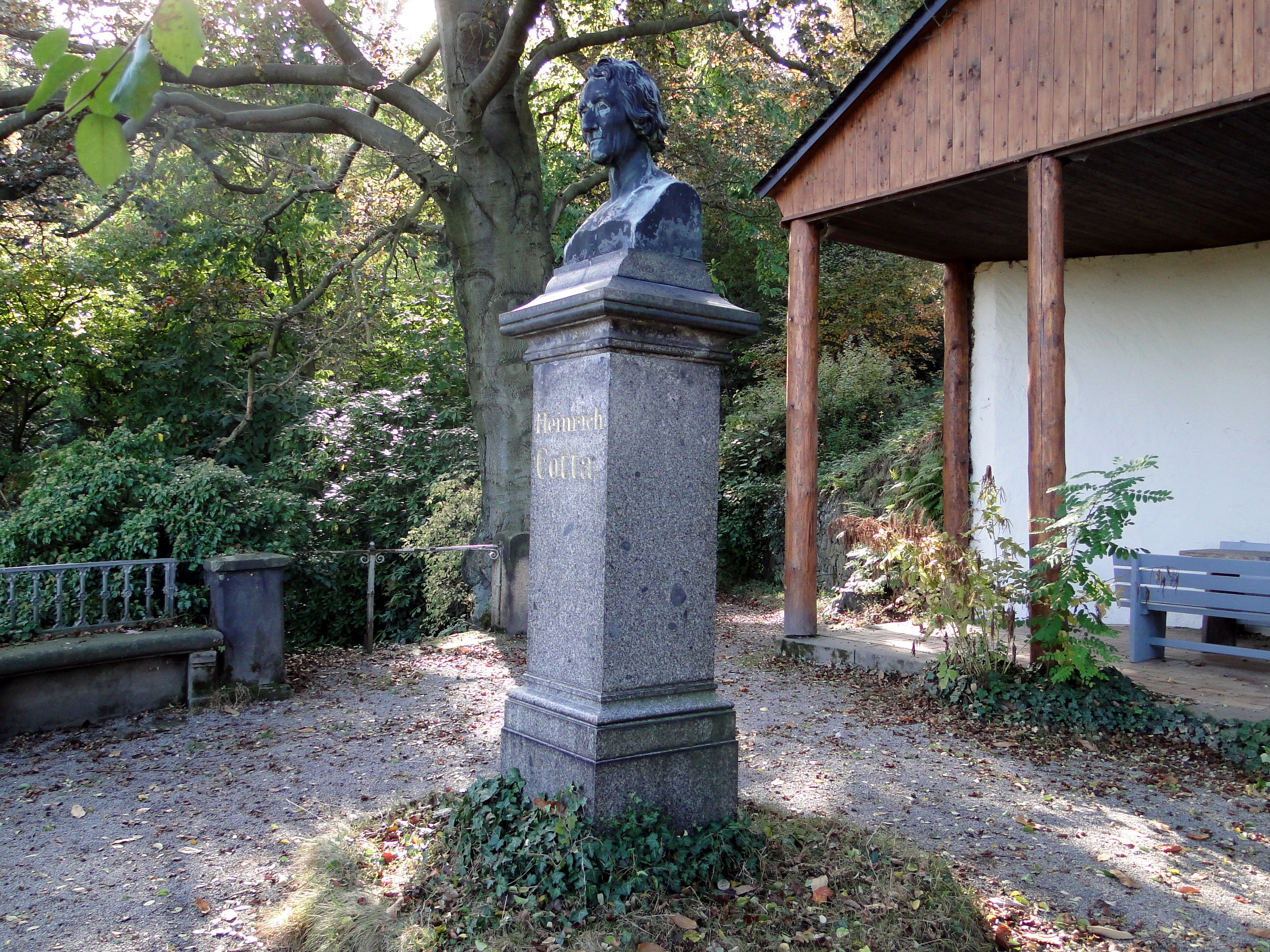
Bust of Heinrich Cotta, sponsor of the Tharandt Forest

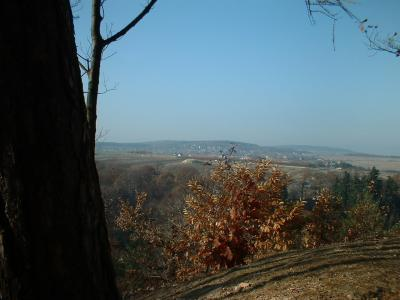
View from the Kienberg of Hartha and the Landberg

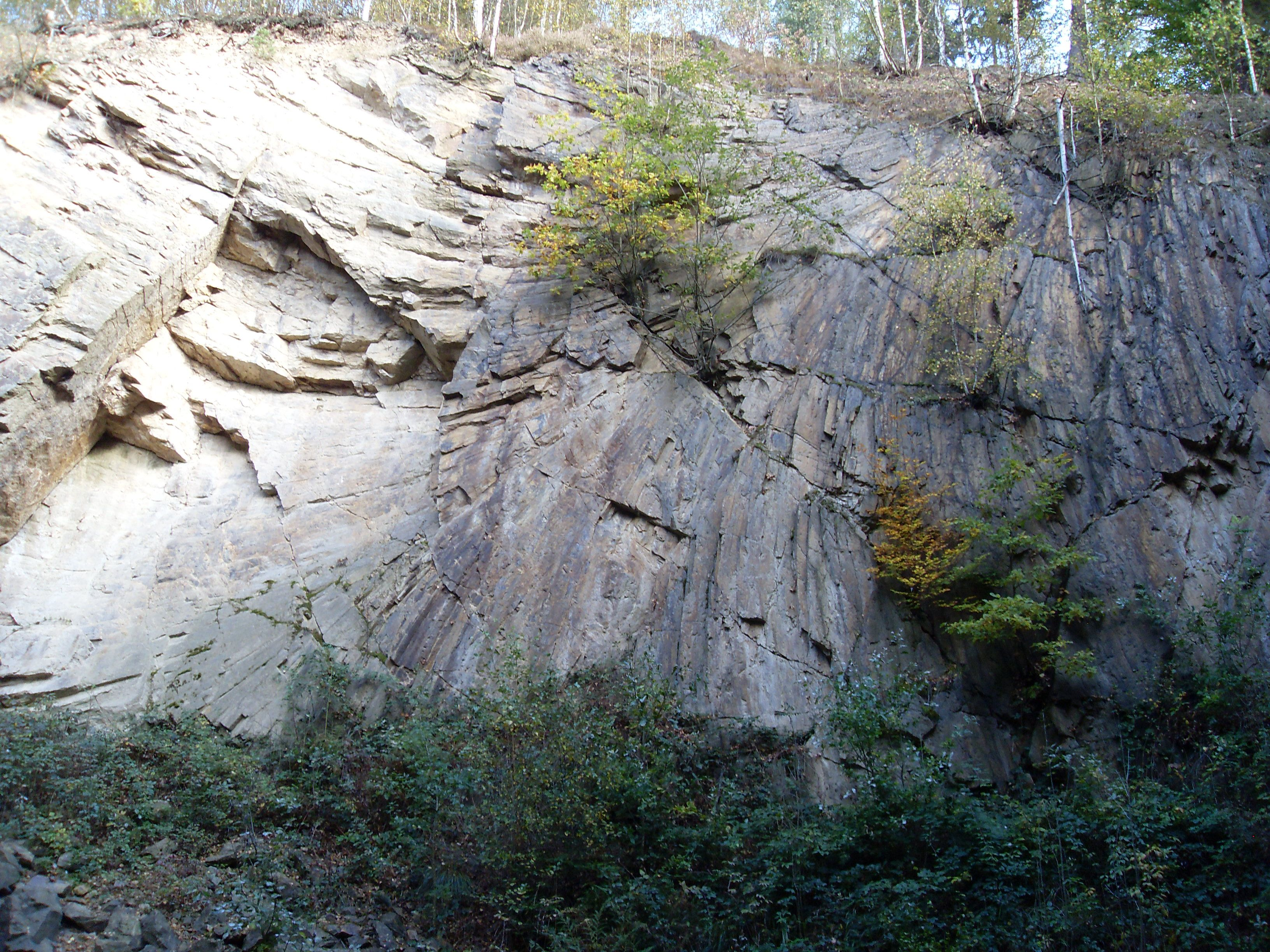
Porphyrfächer, geological outcrop near Mohorn-Grund

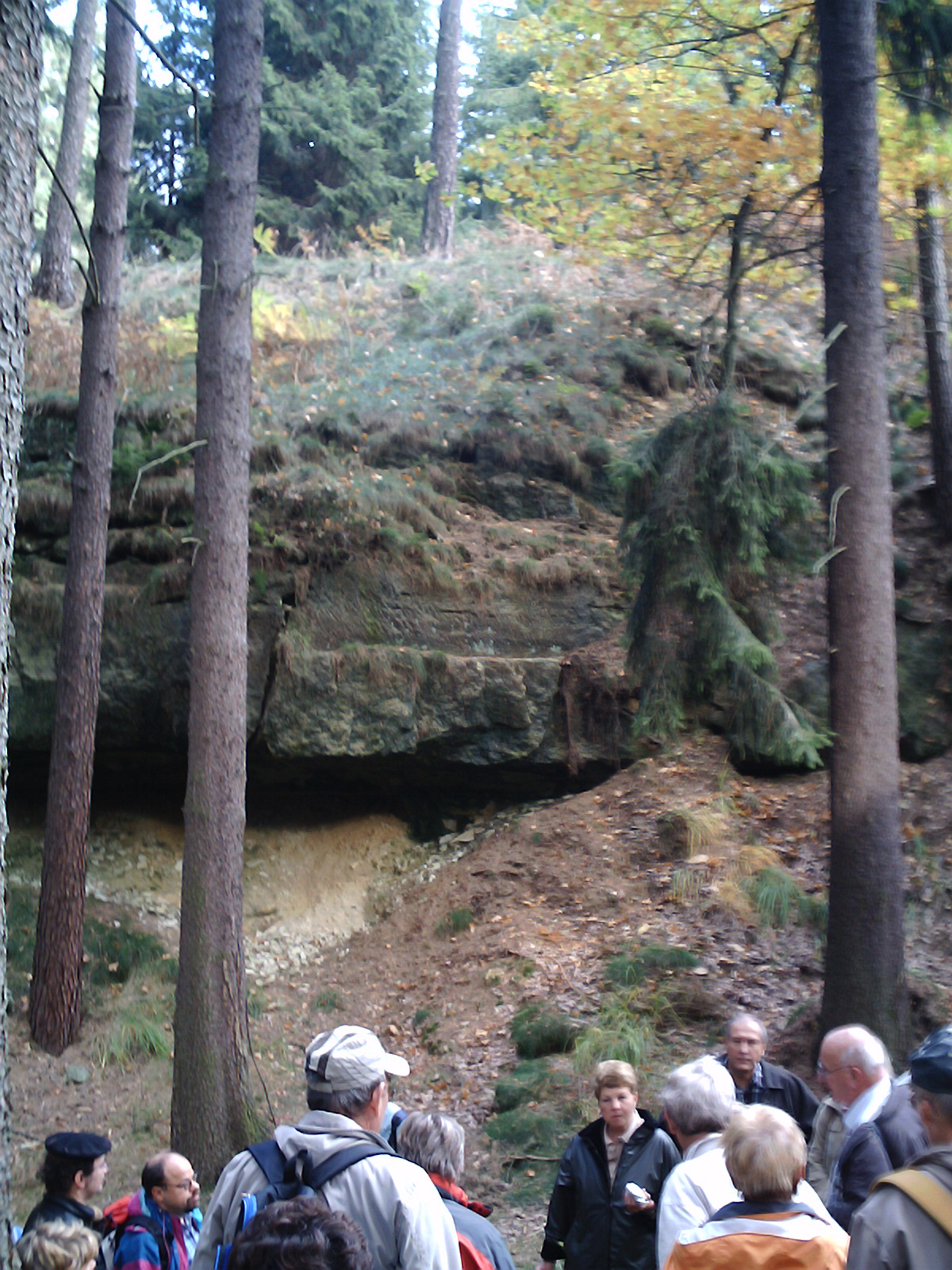
Sandstone faulting near Niederschöna

The Tharandt Forest (German: Tharandter Wald) is a landscape in the centre of the German Free State of Saxony and lies southwest of the forest town of Tharandt, south of the town of Wilsdruff, roughly between the cities of Freiberg and Dresden. Administratively it is fully part of the borough of Tharandt today and bears a legally-protected strapline with the text: Tharandter Wald – schönster Wald Sachsens ("Tharandt Forest - Saxony's most beautiful forest"), which goes back to the tourist advertisements of the 1920s.

== History ==
In the 12th century, the village of Warnsdorf existed for a short time in the middle of the forest by the water-rich Warnsdorf Spring of the Triebisch river. The foundations of a large Roman site from the 13th century were discovered in the neighbouring village of Grillenburg which, then as now, was completely surrounded by the forest. Several routes run through the forest, including the Princes' or Lords' Way. During the Early Modern Period the forest was a hunting ground for the territorial princes (Grillenburg Hunting Lodge) and was also a source of timber and charcoal for mining (charcoal burning) and the residence city of Dresden (timber rafting). Forest glassworks are also discernible near Hetzdorf (Glasergrund) and Hartha (Glasbruch). The beekeepers and forest keepers (collectively called Zeidler) that settled in Fördergersdorf and Hartha supplied honey and beeswax. And artificial ponds are still used today to farm fish.

In the early 18th century in the Tännichtgrund bottom near Naundorf in the Tharandt Forest was the hideaway of the notorious robber, Lips Tullian and his Black Guard (Schwarzen Garde). Tullian was feared throughout Saxony. His lair is stilled recalled by the Lips Tullian Rocks (Lips-Tullian-Felsen) named after him and the old Thieves' Chamber (Diebskammer).

Around 1800 the forest had been seriously reduced by logging and was reforested by Johann Heinrich Cotta on scientific principles. The Tharandt Forest thus became a model for the concept of sustainable forest management that was born out of necessity. This resulted in the formation of the forestry academy and the botanical forest gardens in Tharandt.

Map of Tharandt Forest (c. 1891)

From the 18th century the forest was used as a place of recreation by middle-class families, especially from Dresden. These included such well-known personalities from the sciences and arts as Heinrich Ernemann and Eva von der Osten, who established their summer residences here. During the Nazi era Saxony's Gauleiter and state huntsmaster, Martin Mutschmann, used the Grillenburg hunting lodge as the headquarters of the Saxon Hunting Court (Sächsischen Jägerhof). Its guest house, the Neues Jägerhaus, also used by him and acted during the GDR period as a VdN convalescent home, known as Elsa Fenske, for victims of fascism.

The entire forest was a recreation area for many years and was signed by volunteers from the Cultural Association of the GDR who also laid out a nature trail. As a contiguous and easily accessible natural region the Tharandt Forest continues to act as a recreation area for the population of the surrounding area and its visitors. There are educational trails and paths for hiking, riding and cycling. Coaches and sleds are permitted on several routes.

The region around the Tharandt Forest has been represented since 1997 by the Tharandt Forest Queen (Tharandter-Wald-Königin), a new one being appointed every two years and who is presented and crowned at the traditional choir gathering, the Chortreffen am Tharandter Wald by the Tharandt Forest Tourist Association (Verkehrs- und Verschönerungsverein "Tharandter Wald" e.V.).
