= Holy Way =

Coordinates: 50.9790°N 13.5278°E

The Holy Way (German: Heilige Weg) came about as a result of the canonization of Bishop Benno of Meissen. It led from Bohemia to Meissen and ran between Grillenburg and Wilsdruff in the present-day district of Sächsische Schweiz-Osterzgebirge in the opposite direction and parallel with the Saxon St. James' Way (Sächsischen Jakobsweg). Original sections of the route have survived, for example in the Tharandt Forest between Grillenburg and Spechtshausen.

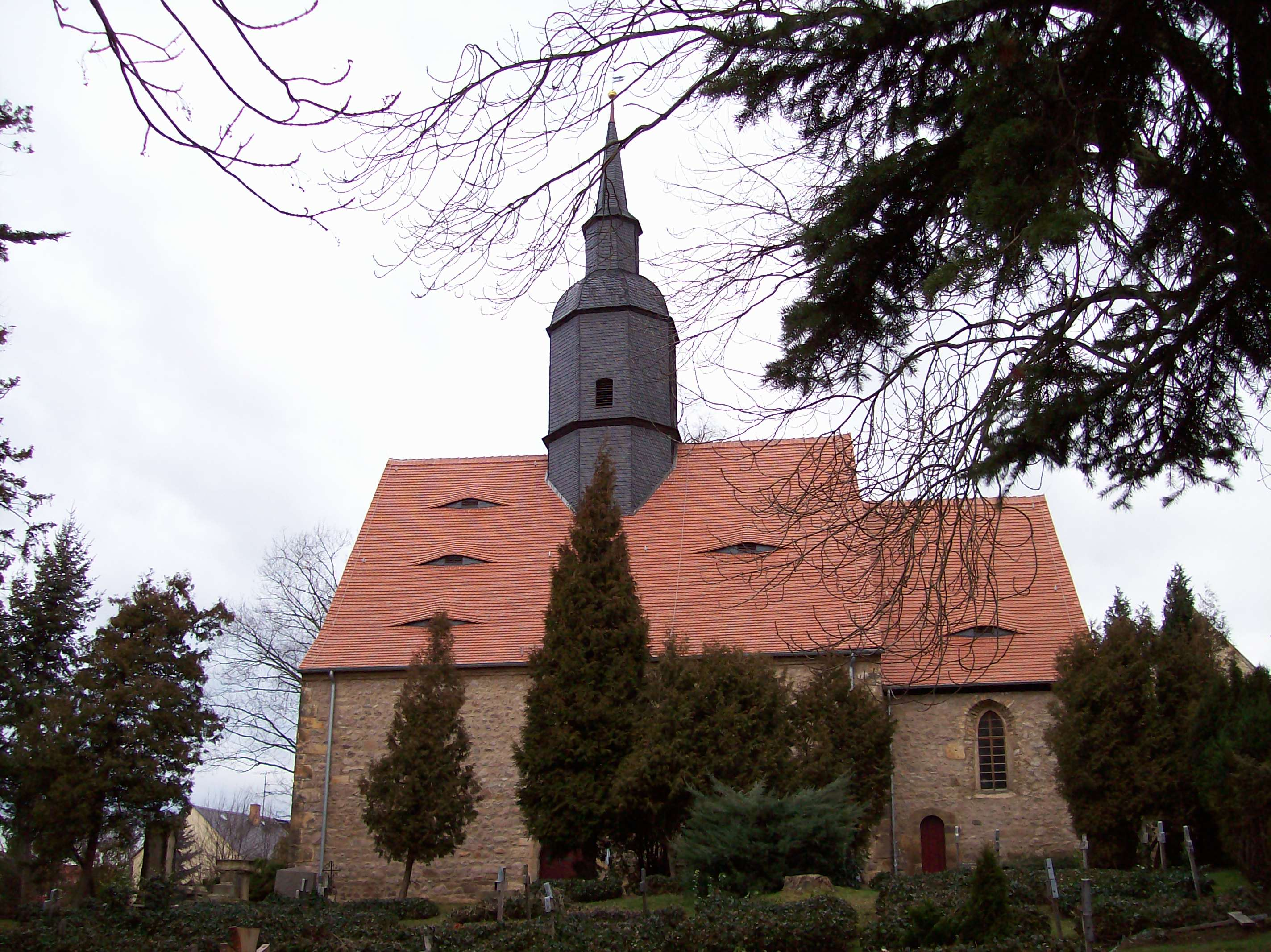
St. James' Church, Wilsdruff (today a motorway church) with memorial garden (Ehrenfriedhof)

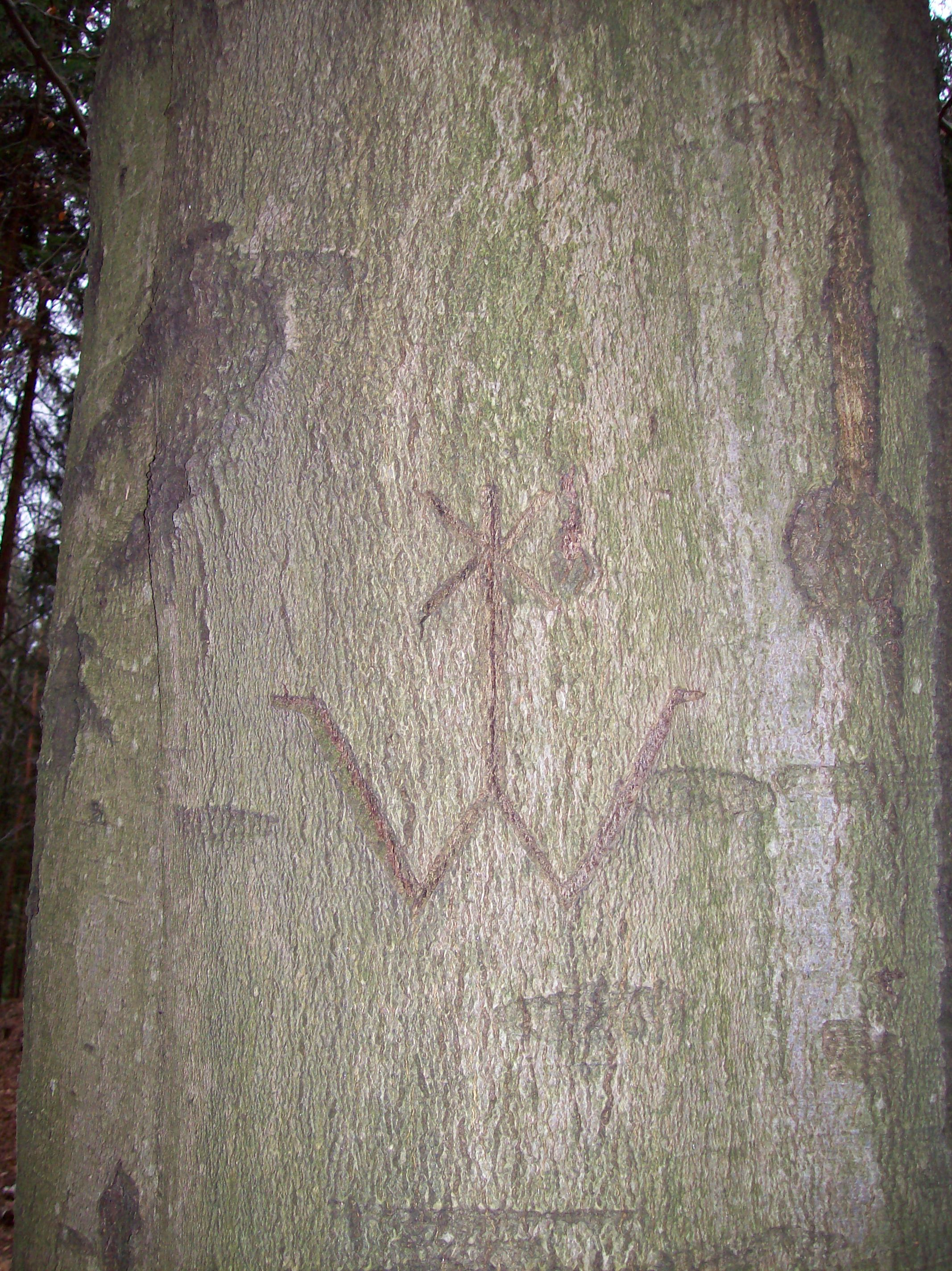
Reconstructed forest sign marking the Princes' or Lords' Way (Fürstenweg or Herrenweg) in the Tharandt Forest

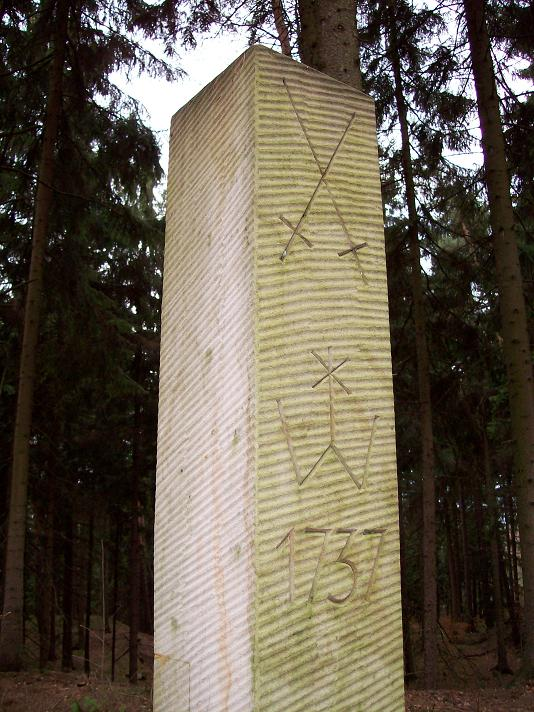
Hunters' column in the Tharandt Forest

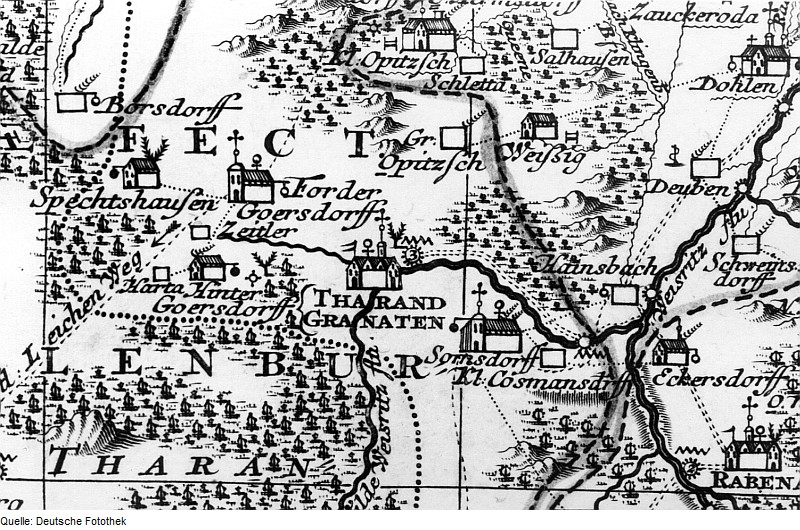
Leichen Weg via Forder Goersdorff, section of an 18th-century map

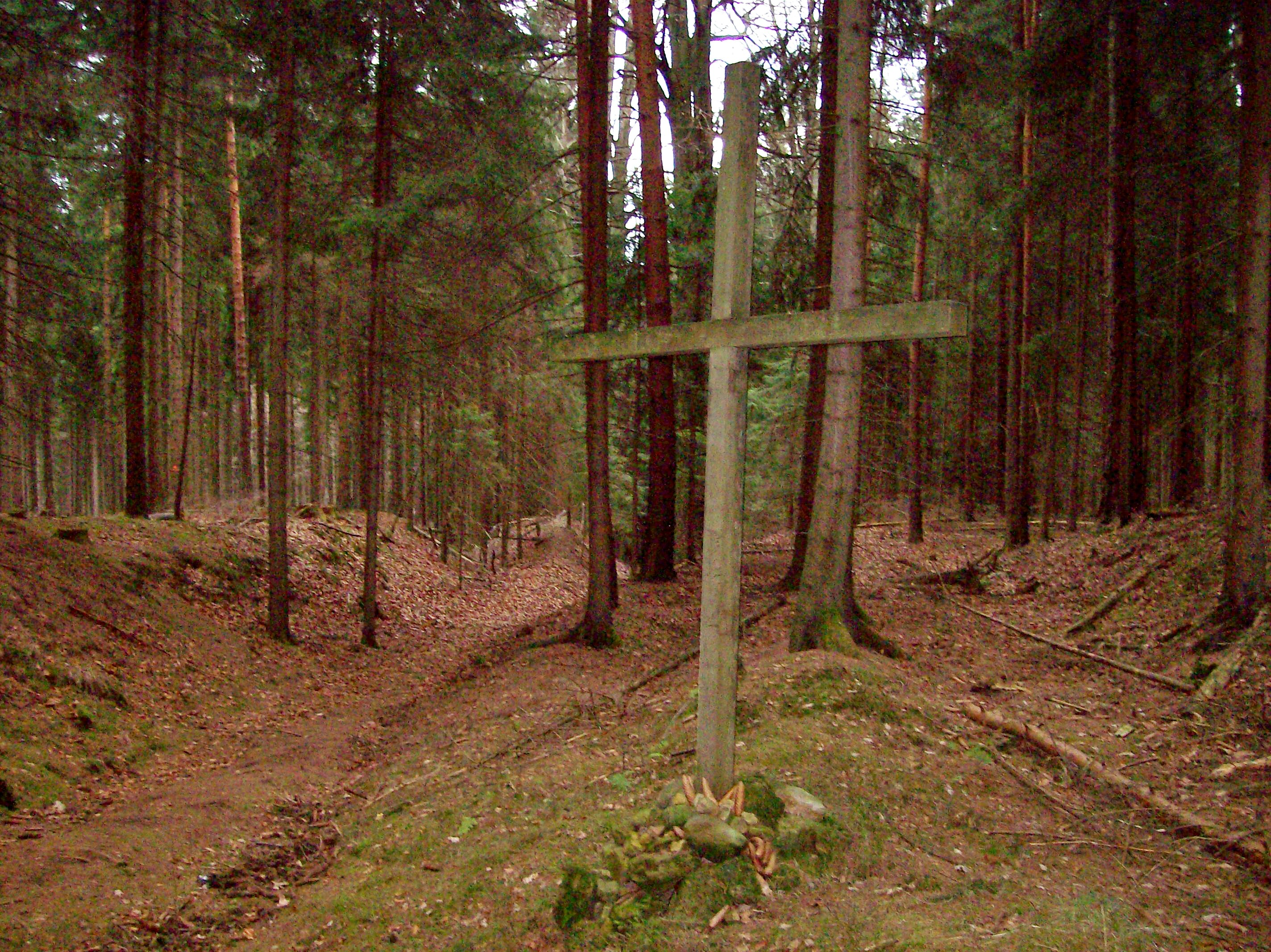
Pilgrim's cross in the Tharandt Forest

== Sources ==
- Kurt Osk. Lehm: Aus Vergangenheit und Gegenwart der bei Tharandt gelegenen Orte Hartha, Grillenburg, Fördergersdorf, Hintergersdorf, Spechtshausen und Porsdorf, Selbstverlag des Verfassers, 1904
- Walter Bachmann: Grillenburg, Mitteilungen des Landesvereines Sächsischer Heimatschutz, Heft 5–8, Band XXV, Dresden, 1936
- Kulturbund der DDR, Ortsgruppe Tharandt (pub.): Der Tharandter Wald, Forststadt Tharandt, Beiträge zur Heimatgeschichte, Heft 7, Tharandt, 1982
- Heinz Weise (ed.): Mark Meißen, F.A. Brockhaus Verlag, Leipzig, 1st ed., 1989
- Heinrich Magirius, Norbert Oelsner, Reinhard Spehr: Grillenburg, Landesamt für Denkmalpflege Sachsen, Arbeitsheft 10, Dresden, 2006, ISBN 978-3-937602-85-1

== Literature ==
- Renate Rettig: Der Jakobspilgerweg im Tharandter Wald..., Förderverein Gästeführer Tharandter Wald-Osterzgebirge e.V. (Hrsg.), Kurort Hartha 2010
- Historischer Pilger- und Jagdweg im Tharandter Wald, André Kaiser
- Stephan Klingbeil: Pilgerpfade sollen Tourismus ankurbeln, Sächsische Zeitung Freital, 9. Februar 2011, p. 14
- Peter Hertel: Die Muschel weist Pilgern den Weg, Freie Presse Freiberg, 2. Juli 2011; 10
- Peter Hertel: Wanderer wandeln auf heiligem Weg, Freie Presse Freiberg, 5. Juli 2011
- Iris Schmidt: Im Sinne der Muschel pilgern, Freitaler Wochenkurier, 20. Juli 2011, p. 2
- Ines Klein: Auf dem Weg zu sich selbst, Sächsische Zeitung Freital, 26. Juli 2011, p. 14
- Astrid Ring: Auf dem Pilgerweg ins Böhmische, Freie Presse Freiberg, 26. August 2011
