= De Haar, Coevorden =

De Haar
- Former village
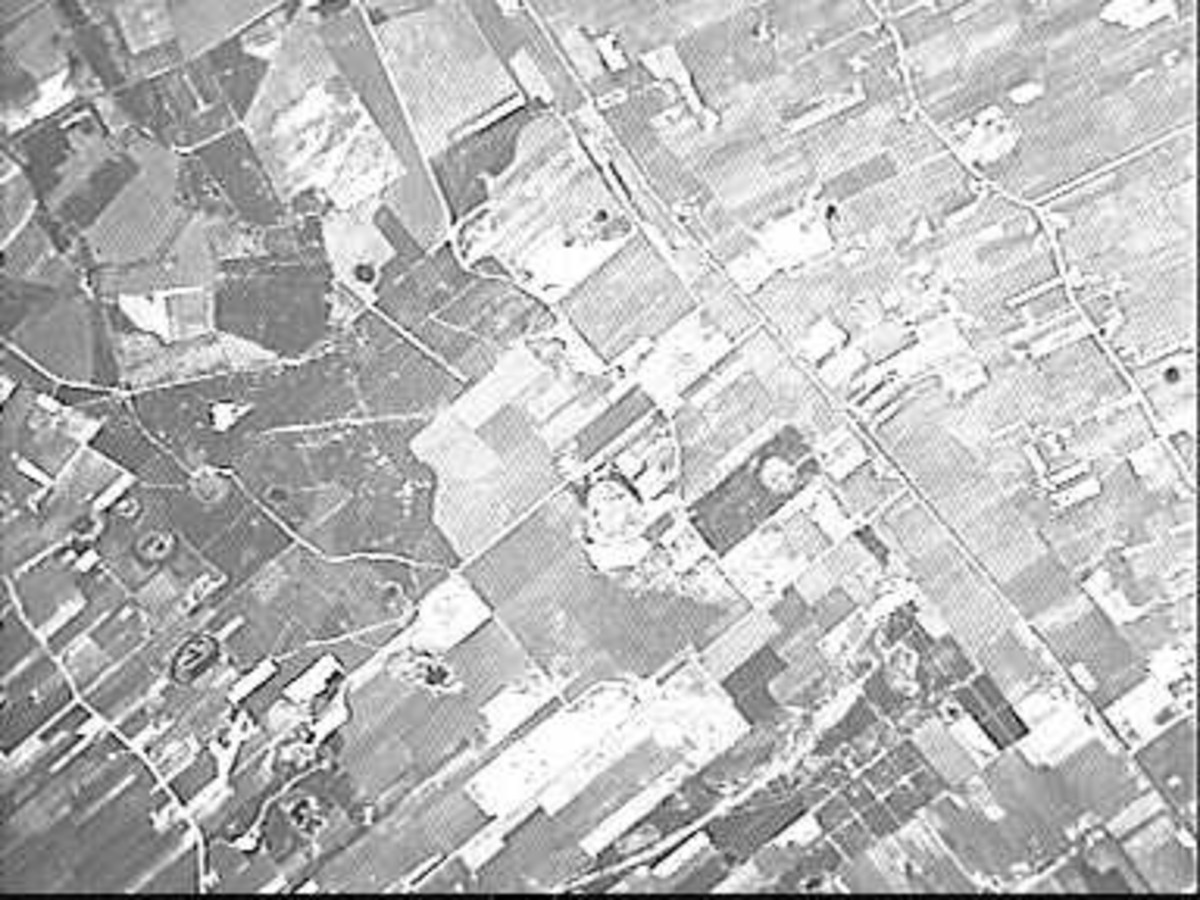
- Farm in Dalerveen
- Interactive map of De Haar
- Coordinates: 52°42′15″N 6°48′26″E
- Country: Netherlands
- Province: Drenthe
- Municipality: Coevorden

De Haar was a village in the Netherlands and part of the Coevorden municipality in Drenthe. In the 1940, De Haar and Dalerveen merged into a single village.
