= Georg Baselitz =

German artist (1938–2026)

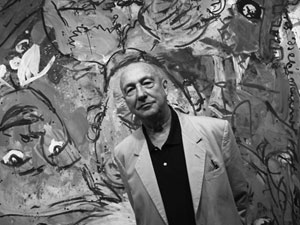
- Born: Hans-Georg Bruno Kern; 23 January 1938; Deutschbaselitz, Gau Saxony, Germany
- Died: 30 April 2026 (aged 88); Salzburg, Austria
- Known for: Painting, sculpture, graphic design
- Movement: Neo-expressionism
- Spouse: Johanna Elke Kretzschmar

Georg Baselitz (born Hans-Georg Bruno Kern; 23 January 1938 – 30 April 2026) was a German-Austrian painter, sculptor and graphic artist. In the 1960s he became well known for his figurative, expressive paintings. In 1969 he began painting his subjects upside down in an effort to overcome the representational, content-driven character of his earlier work and stress the artifice of painting, which would become a defining feature of his later work. Drawing from myriad influences, including Socialist Realism, Mannerism, and African sculpture, he developed his own, distinct artistic language.

Baselitz was born in Deutschbaselitz, Upper Lusatia, Germany. He grew up in the desolation and ruin of post-World War II East Germany, circumstances which informed his future work. After being rejected by East German artistic authorities for his experimental style, Baselitz moved to West Berlin in the early 1960s, where his paintings caused public scandal for their obscenity. This initial controversy jump-started his career in the west, which expanded from painting to printmaking, sculpture, and scenic design. Baselitz's oeuvre is defined by his rejection of order and challenging of conventional forms of perception. His work was well-received by critics and performed well at auction, but he gained a reputation for his outspokenness, particularly with regard to women artists.

== Background ==
Hans-Georg Bruno Kern was born on 23 January 1938, in Deutschbaselitz (now a part of Kamenz, Saxony), in what was later East Germany. His father was an elementary school teacher, and the family lived in the local school building.

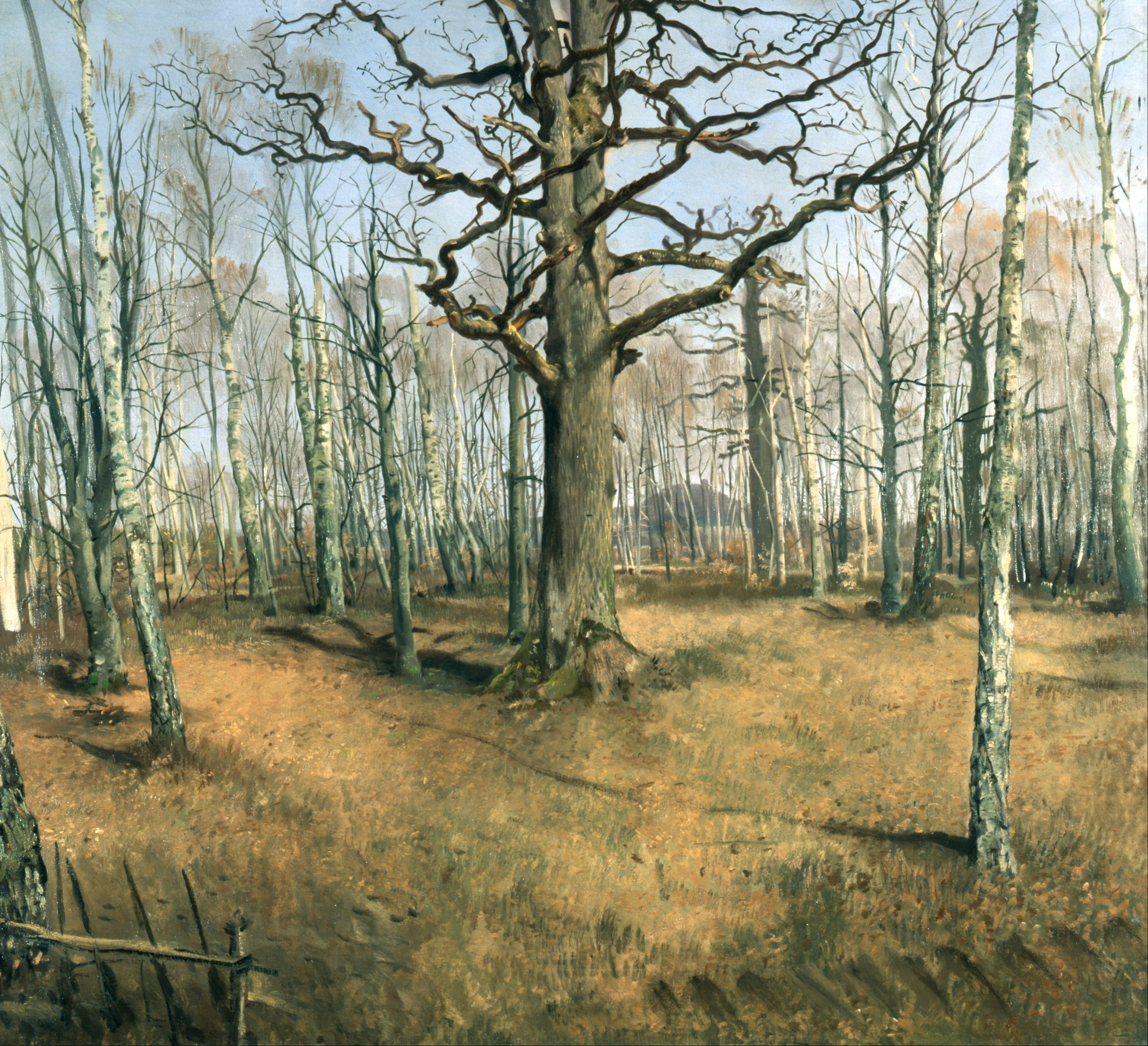
The works of Ferdinand von Rayski, especially Wermsdorfer Wald (1859), had a formative and lasting influence on Baselitz

Baselitz attended the local school in Kamenz. In its assembly hall hung a reproduction of the painting Wermsdorfer Wald (1859) by Louis-Ferdinand von Rayski, an artist whose grasp of realism was a formative influence on Baselitz. Baselitz also became interested in the writings of Jakob Böhme. By the age of 15, he had already painted portraits, religious subjects, still lifes, and landscapes, some in a futuristic style.

In 1955, he applied to study at the Kunstakademie in Dresden but was rejected. In 1956, he successfully enrolled at the Hochschule für Bildende und Angewandte Kunst in East Berlin. There he studied under professors Walter Womacka and Herbert Behrens-Hangeler and befriended Peter Graf and Ralf Winkler (later known as A. R. Penck). After two semesters, however, he was expelled for "sociopolitical immaturity" because he did not comply with the socialist ideas of the GDR.

In 1957, he resumed his studies at the Hochschule der Künste in West Berlin, where he settled down and met his future wife, Johanna Elke Kretzschmar. In 1961, he adopted the name of Georg Baselitz, after his birthplace. Also in 1961, he attended Hann Trier's master class and completed his studies the following year. Trier's classes were described as a creative environment largely dominated by the gestural abstraction of Tachism and Art Informel. At the Hochschule der Künste, Baselitz immersed himself in the theories of Ernst Wilhelm Nay, Wassily Kandinsky, and Kasimir Malevich. During this time he became friends with Eugen Schönebeck and Benjamin Katz. Art historian Andreas Franzke describes Baselitz's primary artistic influences at this time as Jackson Pollock and Philip Guston.

In 1961, he adopted the name Georg Baselitz as a tribute to his home town.

From 2013, he and his wife lived together in Salzburg, Austria, and both also obtained Austrian citizenship in 2015. He married Kretzschmar in 1962 and was the father of two sons, Daniel Blau and Anton Kern, both gallerists.

Baselitz died on 30 April 2026, at the age of 88.

== Work ==
=== 1957–1969 ===
Die Grosse Nacht im Eimer, 1962/63, Museum Ludwig, Cologne

At the turn of 1959 to 1960, Baselitz began to produce his first original works in a distinct style of his own, among them the Rayski-Head (Rayski-Kopf) series and the painting G. Head (G. Kopf).

In 1963, Baselitz's first solo exhibition in West Berlin, at Galerie Werner & Katz, caused a public scandal. Two of the pictures, The Big Night Down The Drain (Die große Nacht im Eimer) (1962/63) and The Naked Man (Der Nackte Mann) (1962), were seized two days after the opening of the show by the public prosecutor on the ground of their lewd and obscene content, after a friend of the gallerist Michael Werner had likely already reported the seizure via the German News Agency in the local newspaper B.Z. – a self-fulfilling prophecy and intentional scandal. The ensuing court case did not end until October 1965.

Baselitz spent the spring of 1964 at Schloss Wolfsburg and produced his first etchings in the printing shop there, which were exhibited later that year. Printmaking, a medium which he describes as having "symbolic power which has nothing to do with a painting", has since become an intrinsic part of his artistic repertoire. The next year, he won a six-month scholarship to study at the Villa Romana in Florence. While there, he studied mannerist graphics and produced the Animal Piece (Tierstück) pictures. In general, Baselitz's greatest inspiration stemmed from writers and artists such as Antonin Artaud, Samuel Beckett, Edvard Munch, Jean Dubuffet, and Willem de Kooning, as well as from the expressionist artist association Die Brücke.

==== Series of Heroes and Fractures ====
After returning from Florence to West Berlin, Baselitz created the series of Heroes (Helden, also known as Neue Typen), between 1965 and 1966, which includes, among others, the large-format composition The Great Friends (Die großen Freunde, Museum Ludwig, Cologne). These figures represent a metaphorical image of a man who, having neither nationality nor an affiliation to a place, throws the illusory and megalomaniacal ideals of the Third Reich and East Germany overboard with his desolate, broken, ragged appearance (for example, Rebel, held by the Tate Modern). Baselitz's Helden typically appear alone in a barren landscape with naked arms and legs, and hands opened in a summoning gesture. At times they bear attributes associated with the biography of the artist, who referred to his own childhood in the countryside and identified himself with all of them. Through early 1969, he produced further large-format pictures, such as Woodsmen (Waldarbeiter) as part of a group of pictures known as Fracture Pictures (Frakturbilder).

==== Inverted paintings ====
On the basis of his Fractures, Baselitz used a painting by Louis-Ferdinand von Rayski, Wermsdorf Woods (Wermsdorfer Wald), ca 1859, from his childhood at his elementary school as a model, in order to paint his first picture with an inverted motif: The Wood on Its Head (Der Wald auf dem Kopf) (1969). By inverting his paintings, the artist is able to attempt to emphasize the organisation of colours and form and confront the viewer with the picture's surface rather than the personal content of the image. In this sense, the paintings are empty and not subject to interpretation. Instead, one can only look at them.

In 2020, the Baselitz family donated six of Baselitz's inverted paintings to the Metropolitan Museum of Art, including his first painting of his wife Elke. In 2021, the Museum displayed them in Georg Baselitz: Pivotal Turn.

=== 1970–1975 ===
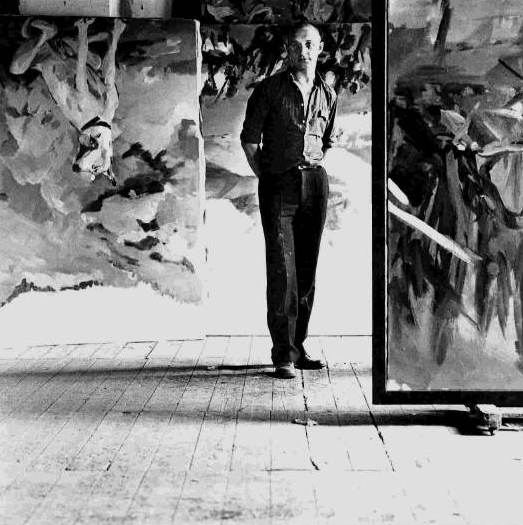
Georg Baselitz (photographed by Lothar Wolleh, 1971)

During the 1970s, Baselitz regularly exhibited at Munich's Galerie Heiner Friedrich. Most of the works he produced during this time were landscapes themed as pictures-within-a-picture. In 1970, at the Kunstmuseum Basel, Dieter Koepplin staged the first retrospective of drawings and graphic works by Baselitz. At the Galeriehaus in Cologne's Lindenstraße, Franz Dahlem put on the first exhibition of pictures with upside-down motifs. In 1971, the Baselitz family once again moved, relocating to Forst an der Weinstraße. He used the old village school as studio and started painting pictures featuring bird motifs. He exhibited several times in the next few years around Germany and also participated in the 1972 documenta 5 in Kassel, where again his work would generate harsh criticism. This same year he began using a fingerpainting technique. He painted landscapes until 1975, often based on motifs he would find in publications such as the ″Mitteilungen des Landesvereins Sächsischer Heimatschutz e. V.″. In 1975, the family moved to Derneburg, near Hildesheim. Baselitz visited New York for the first time and worked there for two weeks. He also visited Brazil, participating in the 13th Biennale in São Paulo.

=== 1976–1980 ===
In 1976, Baselitz rented a studio in Florence, which he used until 1981. In 1977, he began working on large-format linocuts. He began teaching at the Staatliche Akademie der Bildenden Künste in Karlsruhe, where he was appointed professor in 1978. From 1978 until 1980, he worked on diptychs using the tempera painting technique (combinations of motifs), multipart pictures (series of motifs), and large-format individual works such as The Gleaner (Die Ährenleserin), Rubble Woman (Trümmerfrau), Eagle (Adler), and Boy Reading (Der lesende Knabe). His works became more abstract, with scriptural elements predominating. In 1980, he showed a sculpture for the first time at the Venice Biennale.

=== 1981–1989 ===
In 1981, Baselitz set up an additional studio in Castiglion Fiorentino, near Arezzo, which he used until 1987. His work was exhibited in New York for the first time in 1981. By 1982, he began devoting more time to sculpture, in addition to several exhibitions. In 1983, he began using Christian motifs in much of his artwork, and completed the major composition Dinner in Dresden (Nachtessen in Dresden). In the same year, he took up a new professorship at the Hochschule der Künste Berlin. In 1986, in recognition of Baselitz's achievements, he was awarded the Goslarer Kaiserring by the city of Goslar. Through the 1980s, Baselitz's work was exhibited frequently in Germany. In 1989, the title Chevalier dans l'Ordre des Arts et des Lettres was conferred upon Baselitz by French Minister of Culture Jack Lang.

=== 1990–2009 ===
The first major exhibition of Baselitz's works in East Germany was staged at the Nationalgalerie im Alten Museum in Berlin in 1990. In 1992, he resigned from the Akademie der Künste in Berlin. In 1993, he designed the set for Harrison Birtwistle's opera Punch and Judy, staged under the direction of Pierre Audi at the Dutch Opera in Amsterdam. He also took part in the International Pavilion at the Venice Biennale with the Male Torso (Männlicher Torso) sculpture, accompanied by oversized drawings. In 1994, Baselitz designed a stamp for the French postal service. He also produced his first ground gold picture that year. In 1995, the first major retrospective of Baselitz's work in the U.S. was staged at the Solomon R. Guggenheim Museum in New York City. This retrospective was also exhibited in Washington, D.C., and Los Angeles. Throughout the 1990s, his work was exhibited frequently throughout Europe.

During this time, Baselitz lived and worked near Hildesheim (Schloß Derneburg), from 2006 on near Munich, and in Imperia in Italy.

His work was exhibited in London, at the Royal Academy of Arts in late 2007, and in the White Cube gallery in 2009.

=== 2010–2013 ===
From 21 November 2009 to 14 March 2010, the Museum Frieder Burda and Baden-Baden's Staatliche Kunsthalle exhibited a comprehensive survey of the artist, featuring approximately 140 works. Baselitz. A Retrospective was presented at the two neighbouring museums, with the Museum Frieder Burda displaying 50 years of painting and the Staatliche Kunsthalle 30 years of sculpture.

In a 2013 interview, Baselitz was quoted as saying, "women don't paint very well. It's a fact. There are, of course, exceptions." Citing the comparative lack of commercial success of work by women painters in the most expensive markets as proof, he stated, "Women simply don't pass the test. (...) The market test, the value test".

Baselitz's statements elicited rebuttals from art critics like Sarah Thornton, author of Seven Days in the Art World, who countered, "[t]he market gets it wrong all the time. To see the market as a mark of quality is going down a delusional path. I'm shocked Baselitz does. His work doesn't go for so much." The record then for a painting by Baselitz was £3.2 million, while the record for a painting by Yayoi Kusama, a female artist, was £3.8 million.

=== 2014–2026 ===
Baselitz was an active, yet controversial artist and highly critical of German politics. Over the years, Baselitz worked on a series of quiet portraits of both him and his wife, Elke, painted with dark washes of blue and black, somber tones that point to a meditation on mortality and ageing.

For Baselitz's 80th birthday on 23 January 2018, several retrospectives were held in his honour; for instance at Pinakothek der Moderne in Munich, Fondation Beyeler and Kunstmuseum in Basel, as well as in the U.S. at the Hirshhorn Museum in Washington, D.C. With over 100 works highlighting six decades, the Hirshhorn's exhibition was the first major U.S. retrospective of work by Baselitz in more than 20 years.

Devotion, an exhibition of paintings and works on paper by Baselitz inspired by self-portraits of artists he admired and or was influenced by, was exhibited at Gagosian Gallery in New York in early 2019. The same year, Alan Cristea Gallery also published a series of 32 etchings by the artist of the same title.

In 2019 a retrospective curated by Kosme de Barañano was held at the Gallerie dell'Accademia in Venice to coincide with the 58th Venice Biennale, the first exhibition by a living artist in the museum gallery. He also curated a special exhibition celebrating the life and work of his friend and fellow artist, Emilio Vedova, at the Fondazione Emilio e Annabianca Vedova, entitled Vedova di/by Baselitz. In October 2021 a major retrospective of Baselitz's opened at the Centre Pompidou in Paris, including paintings, sculptures, drawings, and prints, as well as display cases with archival and documentary material. The exhibition was the last one curated by Bernard Blistène as the director of the museum. From 13 September 2024 to 16 March 2025, Georg Baselitz: The Last Decade at the Sakıp Sabancı Museum in Istanbul brought together paintings and sculptures produced during the preceding ten years.

In 2026, White Cube hosted Back Again, one of the final exhibitions conceived by Baselitz before his death. The solo show brought together recurring motifs from his sixty-year career, including eagles, hero figures and portraits of his wife, Elke Kretzschmar. Reviewing the exhibition, art critic Eddy Frankel noted that due to physical limitations, Baselitz painted these final works from a wheeled chair using a brush attached to a pole, leaving visible tracks across the canvases placed on the floor.

== Style ==
In the 1970s, Baselitz became famous for his upside-down images. He is seen as a revolutionary painter as he draws the viewer's attention to his works by making them think and sparking their interest. The subjects of the paintings do not seem to be as significant as the work's visual insight. In his artmaking after the 1970s, Baselitz varied his aesthetic creation, ranging from layering substances to his style itself. Then from the 1990s on, he focused more on lucidity and smooth changes. His drawings and paintings from the final decade show the artist revisiting, correcting, and varying his earlier work. His self-reflection can be seen as going hand in hand with an insouciant and surprisingly unfettered graphic style.

== Controversy ==
Baselitz's disparaging remarks about women artists earned him a reputation as a sexist, and he was accused of reinforcing gender bias in the art world.

== Art market ==
Baselitz's highest selling painting currently is Mit Roter Fahne (With Red Flag) (1965), which sold for £7,471,250 (US$9,099,982), at Sotheby's London on 8 March 2017.

The highest selling sculpture by the artist to date is Dresdner Frauen – Besuch aus Prag (Women of Dresden – Visit from Prague) (1990), a work of tempera on ash wood which sold for $11,240,000, at Sotheby's New York City on 19 May 2022.

== Honours and awards ==
- 1965: Villa Romana Prize
- 1968: ars viva prize of the Cultural Committee of German Business
- 1984–92: Member of the Academy of the Arts, Berlin
- 1986: Goslarer Kaiserring
- 1987: Chevalier de l'Ordre des Arts et des Lettres
- 1992: Officier de l'Ordre des Arts et des Lettres
- 1999: Honorary member at the Royal Academy of Arts, London
- 1999: Art Prize Rhenus Mönchengladbach
- 2000: Honorary professor at the Jan Matejko Academy of Fine Arts, Kraków
- 2001: Julio González Prize Valencia
- 2002: Commandeur de l'Ordre des Arts et des Lettres
- 2003: Lower Saxony State Prize
- 2004: Praemium Imperiale
- 2004: Honorary Professor at the Accademia delle Arti del Disegno in Florence
- 2005: Austrian Decoration for Science and Art
- 2006: Honorary Citizen of the city of Imperia
- 2008: B.Z. Culture Prize
- 2009–21: Full member of the Bavarian Academy of Fine Arts
- 2009: Cologne-Fine-Art Award of the Association of German Galleries and Editions
- 2012: Chevalier de la Légion d'Honneur
- 2019: Foreign associate member Académie des Beaux-Arts

== Bibliography ==
- Georg Baselitz: Collected Writings and Interviews, edited by Detlev Gretenkort. Ridinghouse, London 2010. ISBN 978-1-909932-61-6.
- Georg Baselitz. Bilder, die den Kopf verdrehen. Seemann, Leipzig 2004. ISBN 978-3-86502-089-5.
- Georg Baselitz. Paintings 1962–2001, edited by Detlev Gretenkort, mit einem Essay von Michael Auping, Milano 2002.
- Georg Baselitz. Retrospektive 1964–1991, edited by Siegfried Gohr. Hirmer, Munich 1992. ISBN 978-3-7774-5830-4.
- "Ich will es noch einmal schaffen"—Interview with Georg Baselitz, in art magazin 3/2006, pp. 36–43.
- Christian Malycha, Das Motiv ohne Inhalt. Malerei bei Georg Baselitz 1959–1969. Bielefeld 2008. Kerber Artbooks. ISBN 978-3-86678-131-3.

== See also ==
- List of German painters
