= Frankenhausen =

Frankenhausen is a German-language place name that may refer to the following:

- Bad Frankenhausen, Thuringia

- Battle of Frankenhausen

- Frankenhausen in Crimmitschau, Free State of Saxony

- Frankenhausen Abbey

- Frankenhausen in Mühltal, Hesse
- Frankenhausen in Grebenstein, Hesse

== See also ==
- Frankhauser
