= Rayski =

Rayksi is a Polish surname. Notable people with the surname include:

- Adam Rayski (1913–2008), Franco-Polish journalist and Resistance leader
- Ferdinand von Rayski (1806–1890), German painter
- Ludomił Rayski (1892–1977), Polish Air Force general
