= Storl =

Storl and Störl are surnames of German origin. Notable people with the surnames include:

- Dennis Störl (born 1979), German ski jumper
- David Storl (born 1990), German shot putter
- Wolf-Dieter Storl (born 1942), German cultural anthropologist
