= Frankhauser (surname) =

Frankhauser is a German language habitational surname for someone from any of several places named Frankenhausen. Notable people with the name include:

- Barry L. Frankhauser, Australian archaeologist
- Jenny Frankhauser (born 1992), German reality TV participant and singer
- Roy Frankhauser (1939–2009), American Nazi Party member
- William H. Frankhauser (1863–1921), Michigan republican
