= Die große Nacht im Eimer =

Painting by Georg Baselitz

- Artist: Georg Baselitz
- Year: 1962–63
- Medium: oil on canvas
- Dimensions: 250 cm × 180 cm (98 in × 71 in)
- Location: Museum Ludwig, Cologne

Die große Nacht im Eimer (The Big Night Down the Drain) is an oil on canvas painting by the German painter Georg Baselitz. It was painted in 1962–1963 and is now held in the Museum Ludwig in Cologne.

== Description and analysis ==
The painting provocatively depicts a masturbating figure. His facial features are hardly recognizable and he seems to be bare-chested and wearing shorts. The background of the painting is entirely dark. An object not easily identifiable stands behind the figure. One interpretation is that the painting shows a boy after masturbating, while another is that it depicts a hideous dwarf (with Hitler hairdo) with a penis of grotesque size. In both cases, the focus of the painting is sex, and Baselitz's primary objective was to shock his audience. Baselitz said he used the erect organ "as an aggressive act or shock", and it was with attitude the genitals represent that was offensive. It was a caricature to remind the Germans of World War II.

The art historian Klaus Gallwitz described the motif: “The figure, whose physique is reminiscent of a boy, stands with legs apart and holds an oversized phallus in his left hand. He looks past the viewer.” The slender figure stands in extreme contrast to the overemphasized masculinity: “The shape of the face, like the upper body covered with informal brush strokes, has no other physiognomic features apart from the eyes and a large ear.” In the same year, Baselitz created another painting of sexual content with the same title (oil on canvas, 180 × 165 cm), now in a private collection. Here the motif shows the figure with its head and phallus lowered, in a broken depiction of sexuality. There is also a study for the current painting, named The Great Night (pencil and watercolor, 63 × 48 cm, private collection).

The paintings come from the early phase of Baselitz' work from 1960 to 1963, when the artist was working on Antonin Artaud. In this phase, he created paintings "that reveal a morbid curiosity about 'feverful openings' and 'corpus cavernosum'". The subjects remain in the paintings without context and convey states of their dissolution in color and painterly conception. Baselitz himself called his color tones "mashed" and later explained this early phase in his works as "puberty mud".

In October 1963, the work, as well as the painting Der nackte Mann, shown in the West Berlin gallery Werner & Katz, was seized by the public prosecutor's office because of immorality. The criminal proceedings ended in 1965 with the return of the pictures.

Baselitz painted a second version of the painting entitled The Big Night Down the Drain (remix), in 2005.
