= Rebel (Baselitz) =

Painting by Georg Baselitz

- Artist: Georg Baselitz
- Year: 1965
- Medium: oil on canvas
- Dimensions: 167.2 cm × 130.2 cm (65.8 in × 51.3 in)
- Location: Tate Modern; London

Rebel (German: Rebell) is an oil on canvas painting by German artist Georg Baselitz, created in 1965. The painting has the dimensions of 162.7 cm by 130.2 cm and is held at the Tate Modern, in London.

== Description and analysis ==
The painting belongs to a series that Baselitz did in the 1960s depicting male characters, who tend to dominate the space of the canvas, representing archetypes, like heroes and rebels. They are related often to the recent or current situation of Germany. This figure seems inspired by the recent events of World War II, is possibly a soldier, and is shown wounded, bloody and limping, even with a smile on his face. His body appears strangely almost transparent, as it offers a glimpse of his viscous entrails. As a reference to a war, the character holds in one hand the pole of a flag, or perhaps a paintbrush, while his other hand is bandaged. The background is entirely dark, while a burning house is seen in the distance.

Baselitz's depiction appears inspired by his childhood memories of the war, while his style bears references to German Romantic depiction of heroes and heroism, and to German Expressionist denunciation of the cruelty of wars.

According to Gunter Gercken the character is "a peaceful fighter, a green hero, a partisan against war, armed not with a machine gun but with a paintbrush and palette". Instead of a hero of the past it represents a wounded and dishevelled anti-hero of his time.
