= Adolf Paul Schulze =

19th-century German merchant and amateur optical scientist

Adolf Paul Schulze FRSE FRMS
- Born: 8 October 1840; Crimmitschau, Saxony
- Died: 3 January 1891 (aged 50); Glasgow, Scotland
- Education: Chemnitz Polytechnic
- Occupations: merchant, amateur optical scientist
- Known for: created the firm Schulze, Paton & Co
- Spouse: Joanna Miller
- Children: at least 6
- Parents: Adolph Schulze (father); Othilie Jeannette Streit (mother)

Adolf Paul Schulze FRSE FRMS (1840–1891) was a 19th-century German merchant and amateur optical scientist who settled in Scotland. He created the firm Schulze, Paton & Co. He was an expert on microscopes and microphotography and jointly founded the Scottish Microscopical Society. In business he was known as Paul Schulze and in microscopy he was known as Adolf or Adolph Schulze.

== Life ==
He was born in Crimmitschau in Saxony (now south-east Germany) on 8 October 1840, the son of Adolph Schulze (1808–1868) and his wife, Othilie Jeannette Streit. He was educated at the Burgerschule in Crimmitschau then at Zwickau. He studied engineering at Chemnitz Polytechnic.

He moved to England in 1861 and in 1866 joined his brother in a yarn business in Manchester. He moved to Glasgow in 1867 setting up premises at 79 Glassford Street but still giving his address as 38 Chorlton Street in Manchester.

By 1875 he had moved to larger premises at 223 George Street but is still listed as living in Manchester but now at 19 Greenwood Street. In 1879 he joined the Glasgow Natural History Society. He disappears from Glasgow in the early 1880s and reappears living at 2 Doune Gardens in 1885.

In 1887 he was elected a Fellow of the Royal Society of Edinburgh for his contributions to scientific observations. His proposers were William Thomson, Lord Kelvin, John Gray McKendrick, William Dittmar and James Thomson Bottomley.

His company Schulze, Paton & Co, yarn agents and merchants, were based at 9 Cochrane Street in Glasgow's Merchant City from around 1887. His partner was Walter R. Paton. The company also acted as agents for a Viennese and Sicilian Association based at the same address.

He lived at 2 Doune Gardens near the River Kelvin in the Kelvinside district of Glasgow.

He died on 3 January 1891 in Glasgow aged 50.

== Publications ==
- On Microscopy and Microscopic Illumination (1875)

== Family ==
He married Joanna Miller (probably from Manchester), and they had at least six children, including Arthur Paul Schulze (later known as Arthur Paul Miller) (1875–1944).

His son Paul Guido Schulze took over his position in his company on his death.
