= Blankenhain (Crimmitschau) =

- Village of Crimmitschau
- Interactive map of Blankenhain
- Location within Germany Location within Saxony
- Coordinates: 50°47′52″N 12°17′9″E
- Country: Germany
- State: Saxony
- District: Zwickau
- Town: Crimmitschau

Area
  - Total: 11.43 km^{2} (4.41 sq mi)
- Elevation: 331 m (1,086 ft)

Population (2018)
  - Total: 911
  - Density: 79.7/km^{2} (206/sq mi)
- Time zone: UTC+01:00 (CET)
  - Summer (DST): UTC+02:00 (CEST)
- Postal codes: 08451
- Dialling codes: 03762

Blankenhain (German pronunciation: [ˈblaŋkn̩ˌhaɪn]) is a village in Crimmitschau, district of Zwickau, Saxony. Its area is 11.43 km^{2} (4.41 sq mi) and its population is 911 including Großpillingsdorf (2018). The Blankenhain Castle is located in the village.
