= Blankenhain Castle =

Coordinates: 50°48′00″N 12°17′04″E

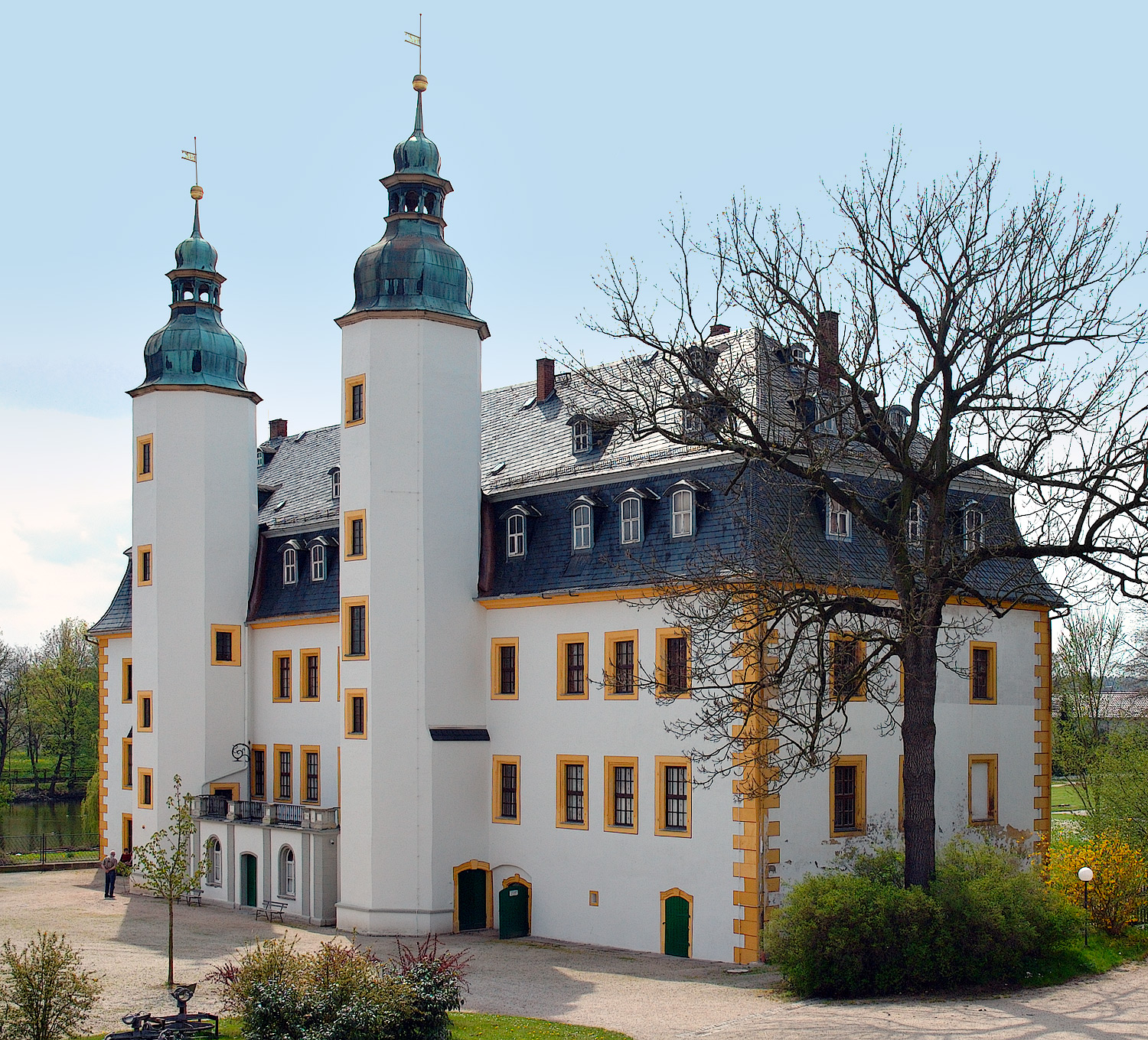
The main castle building.

Blankenhain Castle (German: Schloss Blankenhain) is a large castle in Blankenhain near Crimmitschau, in the district of Zwickau in Saxony, Germany.

The castle dates back to the 12th century. It is first documented in 1423 as Wasserburg. Half of it burned down in 1661 and was rebuilt in 1699 (some sources say 1700). In 1765 the castle acquired its current Baroque appearance with mansard roof and domed towers. After World War II, the Soviet regime ordered the castle destroyed, but it was saved by the intervention of courageous locals. Since 1981, the castle and the surrounding land have been developed as an open-air museum of agriculture and rural life in central Germany between 1890 and 1990. The museum covers 11 hectares, including 60 buildings.

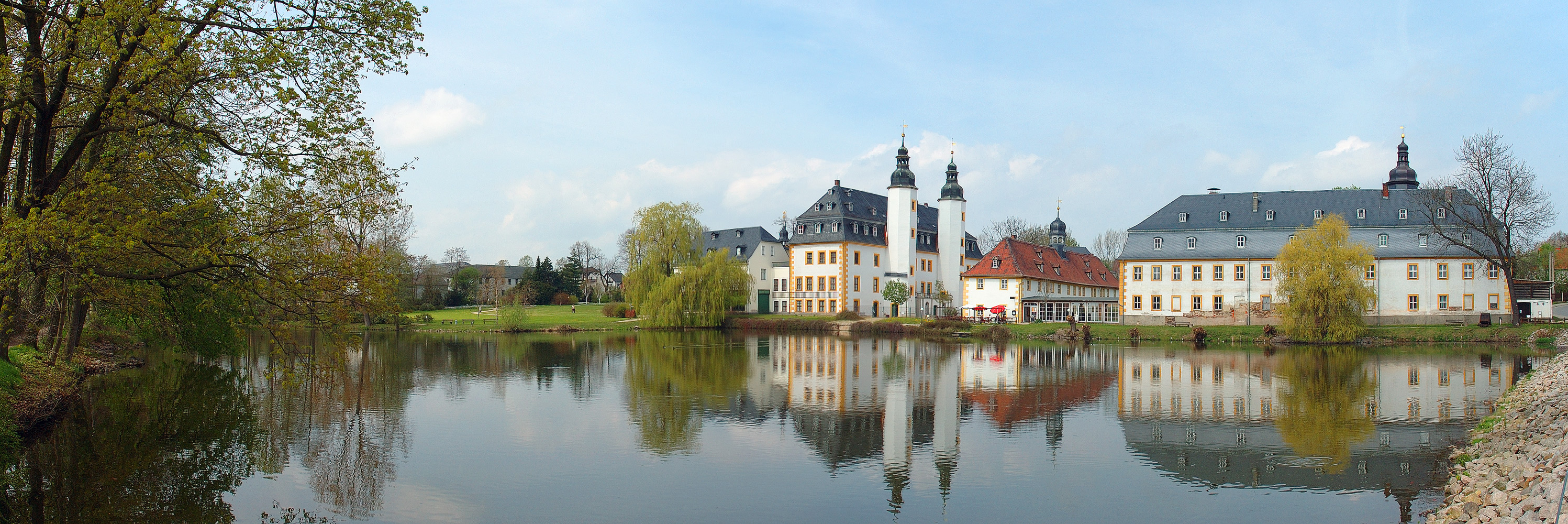
Blankenhain Castle panorama
