= Crimmitschau =

Town in Saxony, Germany

- Town
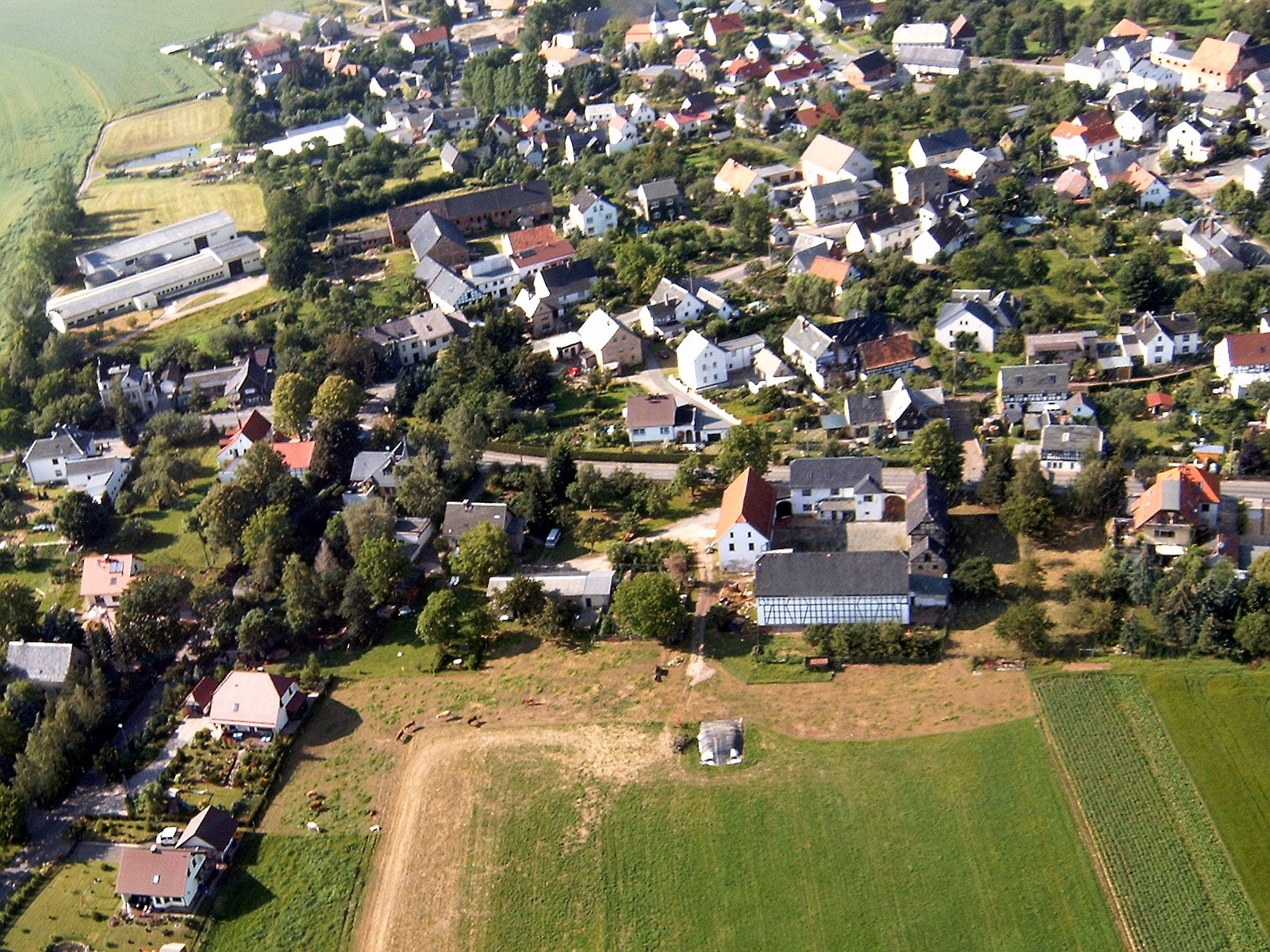
- June 2004 aerial photograph of Mannichswalde, which is part of Crimmitschau,

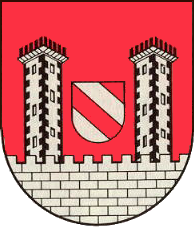
- Coat of arms

- Location of Crimmitschau within Zwickau district
- Interactive map of Crimmitschau
- Location within Germany Location within Saxony
- Coordinates: 50°49′5″N 12°23′15″E
- Country: Germany
- State: Saxony
- District: Zwickau
- Subdivisions: 13

Government
  - Mayor (2017–24): André Raphael (CDU)

Area
  - Total: 61.15 km^{2} (23.61 sq mi)
- Elevation: 273 m (896 ft)

Population (2025-12-31)
  - Total: 17,820
  - Density: 291.4/km^{2} (754.8/sq mi)
- Time zone: UTC+01:00 (CET)
  - Summer (DST): UTC+02:00 (CEST)
- Postal codes: 08451
- Dialling codes: 03762
- Vehicle registration: Z
- Website: www.crimmitschau.de

Crimmitschau (German pronunciation: [ˈkʁɪmɪtʃaʊ]) is a town in the district of Zwickau in Saxony, Germany.

== Geography ==
Crimmitschau lies on the river Pleiße in the northern foothills of the Ore Mountains.

=== Neighboring municipalities ===
Adjacent communities include: Zwickau, Dennheritz, Neukirchen, Meerane, and Langenbernsdorf in Landkreis of Zwickau; Heyersdorf, Jonaswalde, Ponitz and Thonhausen in Thuringian Landkreis of Altenburger Land; as well as Braunichswalde, Rückersdorf, and Seelingstädt in Thuringia in Landkreis of Greiz.

=== Municipality subdivisions ===
The town Crimmitschau consists of Crimmitschau proper and the following five Ortschaften (localities), each containing several Ortsteile or divisions:

- Blankenhain (incl. Großpillingsdorf)
- Frankenhausen (incl. Gösau and Gosel)
- Langenreinsdorf
- Lauenhain
- Mannichswalde

The Ortsteile Rudelswalde and Gablenz are not part of an Ortschaft.

== History ==
In the course of German eastward expansion, the city of Crimmitschau and a castle of the same name (now called the Schweinsburg) were established from around 1170 to 1200 as an organized German colony. The settlement's existence is first documented in 1212. In 1414 Crimmitschau received town privileges from Markgraf Wilhelm II.

On 15 March 1844, Crimmitschau was connected to the German rail network (on the Leipzig–Hof railway, which was later extended to Bavaria). Its current station was opened in 1873

Around the turn of the century, Crimmitschau was the site of a large concentrated textile industry, and was called "The City of 100 chimneys" (Stadt der 100 Schornsteine).

From August 22, 1903, to January 18, 1904, it was the site of one of the largest and longest strikes in the German Empire, which affected the entire nation.

In 1944, some Crimmitschau property was bombed by Allied Forces.

At the end of the 1980s, a great part of the old and inner cities were torn down and replaced with prefabricated concrete buildings. Similar plans existed for the southern suburb, but were not put in place after the regime change in 1990.

== Population ==
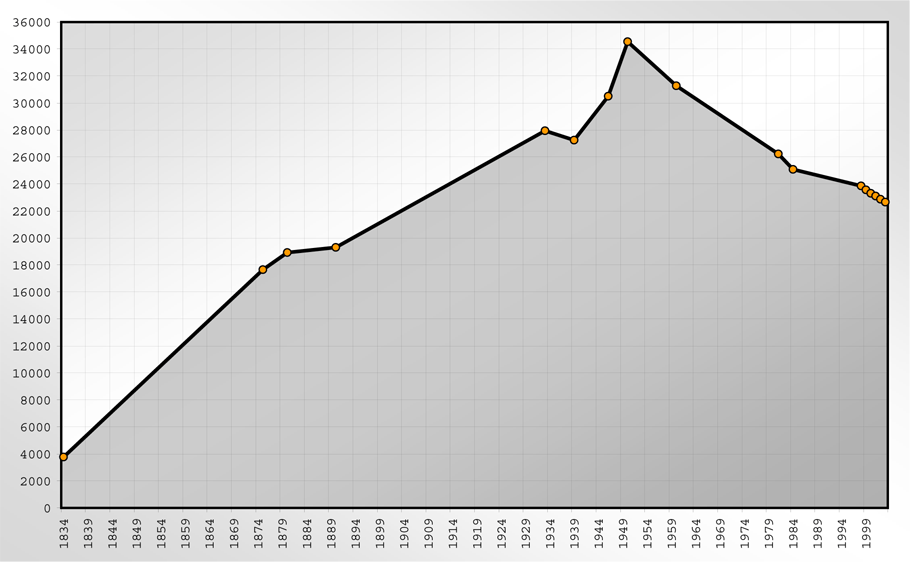
Population of Crimmitschau

Year	Population
1834	3,767
1875	17,649
1880	18,925
1890	19,300
1933	27,938
1939	27,247
1946	30,504
1950	34,541
1960	31,279
1981	26,229
1984	25,086

Year	Population
1995	23,888
1997	23,420
1999	23,570
2000	23,305
2002	22,874
2004	22,528
2006	21,953
2008	21.080
2009	20.833
2010	20.901

=== Religion ===
Even though a majority of the people in Crimmitschau are not affiliated with any religion, there are some Protestant parishes and even a Catholic parish, belonging to the Diocese of Dresden-Meissen. The most important churches are: St. Laurentius-Kirche, Johanniskirche, and the Lutherkirche.

== Twin towns – sister cities ==
Crimmitschau is twinned with:

- Bystřice nad Pernštejnem, Czech Republic
- Wiehl, Germany

== Sights ==
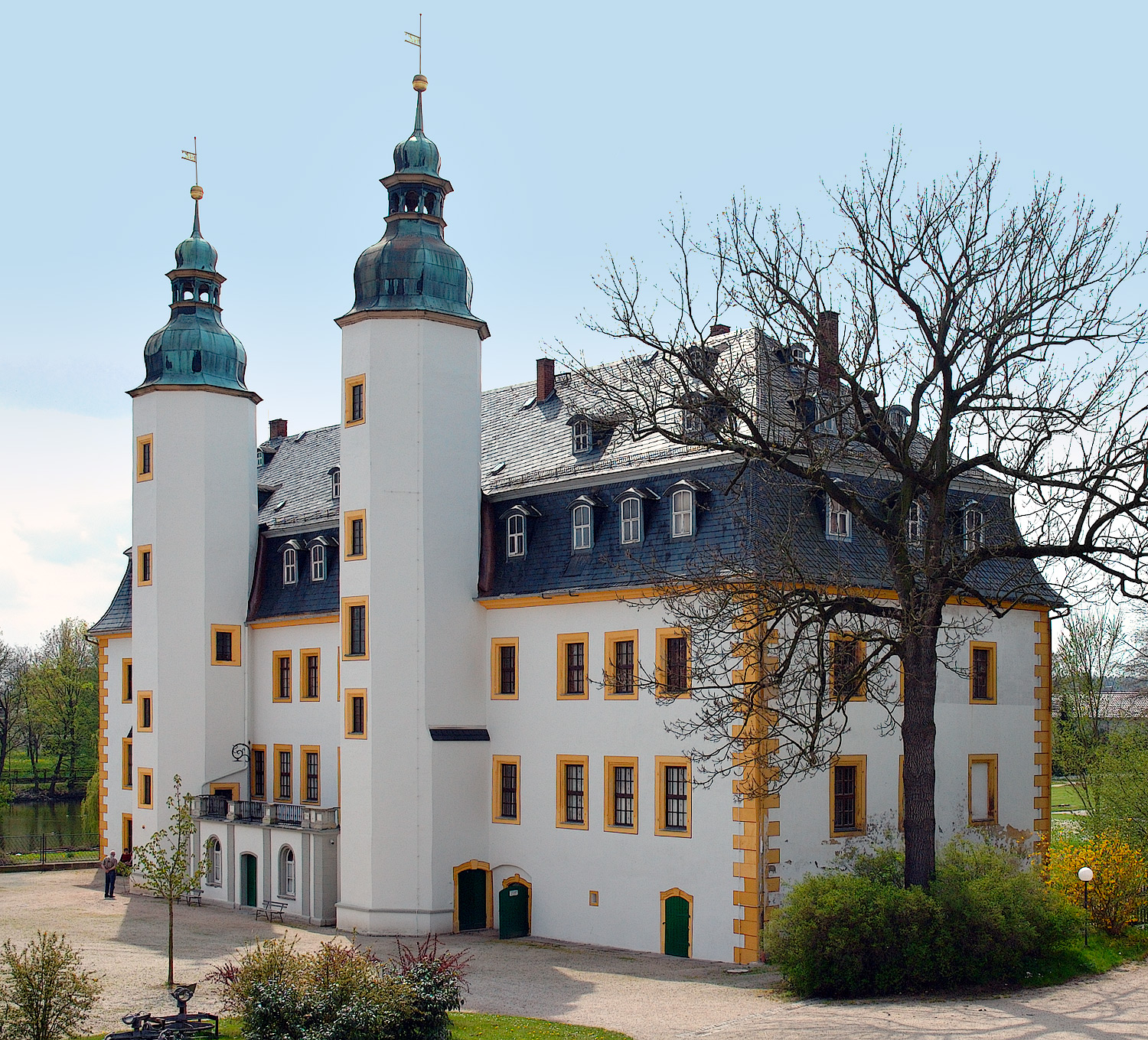
Blankenhain Castle

Landmarks include the town hall, the late Gothic parish church of Saint Laurentius (Saint Lawrence)(1513), with its star and cross ribbed arches, the former Cistercian nunnery of Frankenhausen Abbey (founded around 1290) in the district of Frankenhausen and the open-air museum of Blankenhain Castle located at the castle of the same name.

=== Museums ===
- Western Saxon Textile Museum, which is located in a fully functional textile factory, former known as "Gebrüder Pfau KG"
- The Agricultural and Open-Air Museum of Schloss Blankenhain

=== Parks ===
- The Zöffelpark, which was built in the pre-war period and named after Emil Oskar Zöffel, an important textile manufacturer and Philanthropist in the history of the city.
- The Bismarck-Hain, a former cemetery, named after Reichskanzler Otto von Bismarck. This park was known as Friedenspark (Peace-park) during GDR-times.
- The Sahnpark, located north of the city center, is the largest park in Crimmitschau and harbours an old open-air bath, an animal park and the stadium of ETC Crimmitschau.

== Sport ==
Crimmitschau has a well-known ice hockey club, the ETC Crimmitschau, which plays in the second highest German league. The city also has a soccer team, FC Crimmitschau and an American Football Team, the Tornados Crimmitschau.

== Business and infrastructure ==
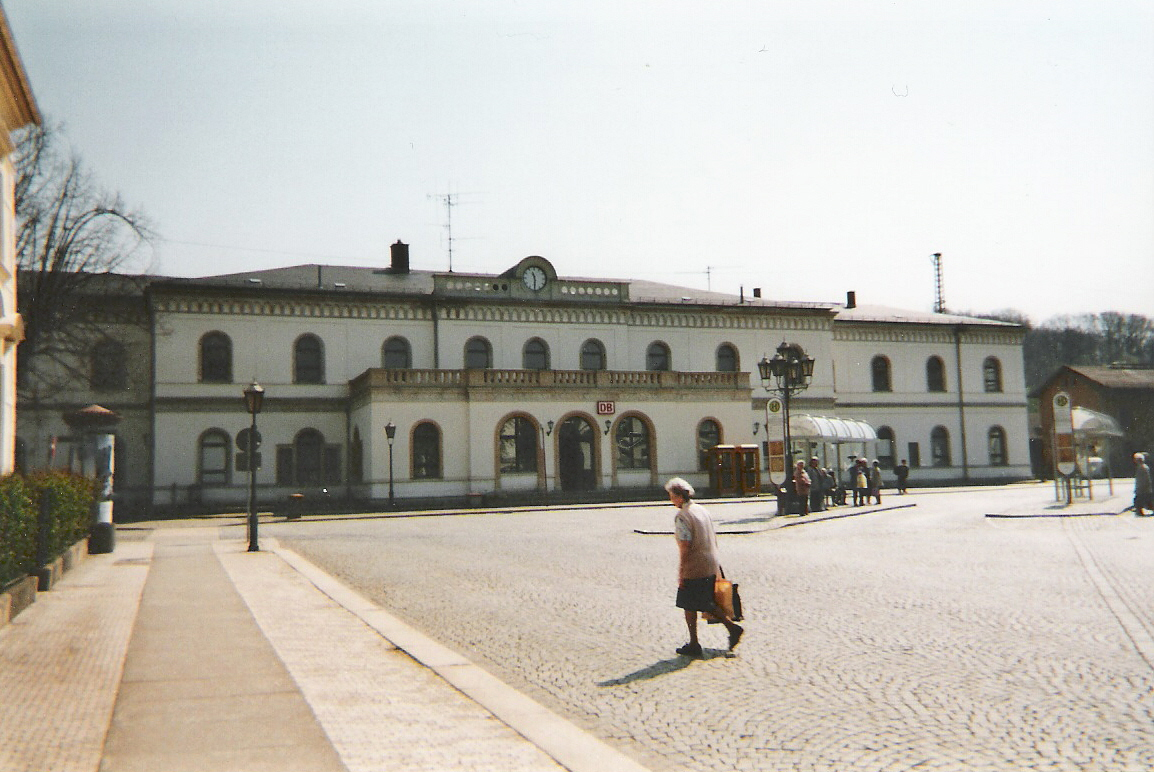
Crimmitschau station

Crimmitschau lies directly at the Autobahn A4 and can be reached through the exits Schmölln and Meerane. Deutsche Bahn provides connections from Crimmitschau station to Zwickau, Leipzig, Hof.

=== Education ===
There are three elementary schools, two secondary schools, a gymnasium, and a special education school in Crimmitschau.

== Notable people ==
- Julius Motteler (1838–1907), Reichstag deputy, co-founder of the Social Democratic Party of Germany
- Adolf Paul Schulze (1840–1891), emigrated to Scotland and became a successful merchant and noted microscopist
- Heinrich Mauersberger (1909–1982), engineer and inventor in the textile industry
- Helmut Bräutigam (1914–1942), composer
- Gerhard Zwerenz (1925–2015), writer and former Bundestag deputy
- Peter Graf (born 1937), painter
- Wolf-Dieter Storl (born 1942), ethnobotanist and author
- Klaus Gruner (born 1954), handball player, Olympic champion 1980
- Udo Kießling (born 1955), ice hockey player
- Gabi Zange (born 1961), speed skater

=== Honorary citizen ===
- 1895: Otto von Bismarck, chancellor of the Reich
- 1984: Walter Richter, gardener
