= Peter Graf (painter) =

German painter

- Born: June 4th 1937; Crimmitschau, Germany
- Spouse: 2 sons
- Children: Karen Graf

Peter Graf (born June 4, 1937 in Crimmitschau) is a German painter. He won the Hans-Theo-Richter-Preis of the Sächsische Akademie der Künste in 2001.

== See also ==
- List of German painters
