= Frankenhausen Abbey =

Former Cistercian abbey in Saxony

Coordinates: 50.8422°N 12.3945°E

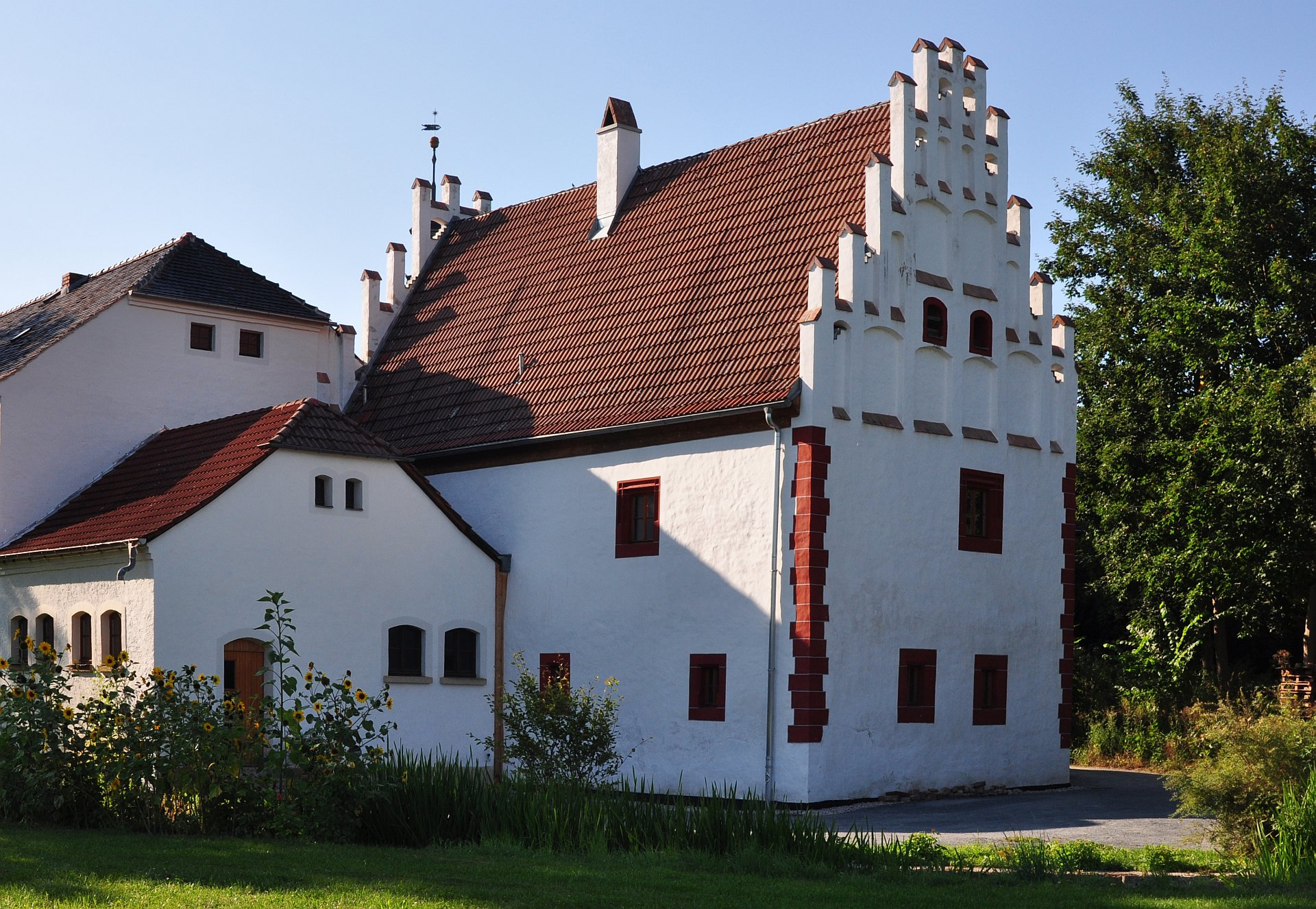
Remains of the abbey buildings - school

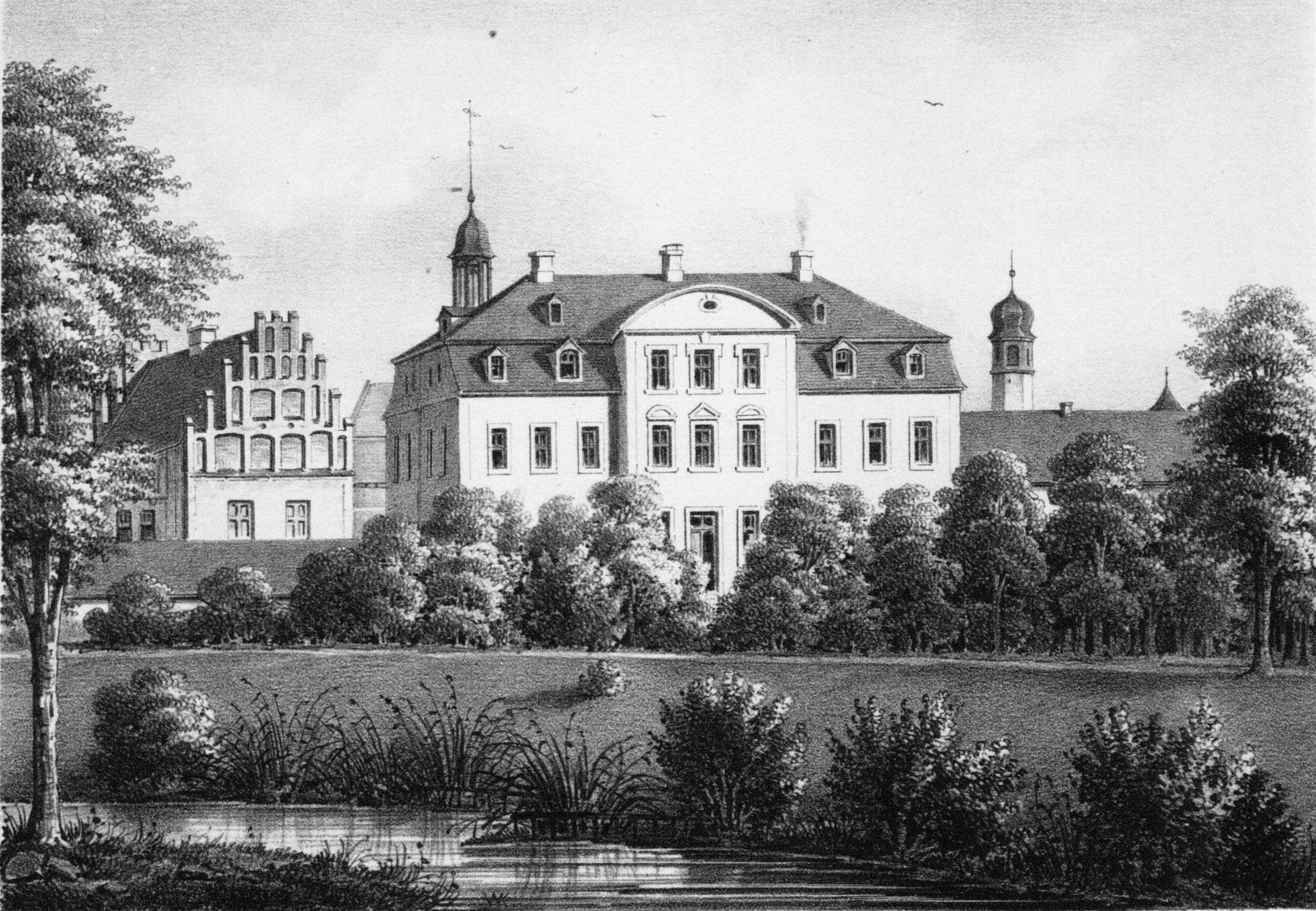
The abbey site in about 1800, showing the country house built in 1741 and demolished in 1948, with the Pleiße in the foreground

Frankenhausen Abbey (German: Zisterzienserinnenkloster Frankenhausen) was a Cistercian nunnery which existed between the 13th and the 16th centuries, located initially in Grünberg in Ponitz, Thuringia, and then from 1292 in Frankenhausen in Crimmitschau, Saxony, Germany.

== History ==
The nunnery, dedicated to Saint George, was established by 1260 in Grünberg. In 1276 it was given the ruined castle in Frankenhausen for its site; after the necessary works the nuns made the move in 1292. In 1410 the abbey was rebuilt after being destroyed by fire. It was dissolved in 1529 in the course of the Protestant Reformation and finally emptied of nuns in 1543.

After some centuries as an estate in private ownership the site was severely damaged in the years immediately after 1945 during land reforms in East Germany. Since 1990 the remaining structures have been under the care of the Landesverein Sächsischer Heimatschutz, who have successfully undertaken their restoration as historical monuments. These are the school, the vault of the widows' house, the tower of the prior's house and the "Kellerberghaus".

== Bibliography ==
- Gereon Christoph Maria Becking: Zisterzienserklöster in Europa, Kartensammlung. Lukas Verlag, Berlin 2000 ISBN 3931836444 p. 55 A.
- Sebastian Brunner (ed.): Ein Cistercienserbuch. Woerl, Wien 1881/Salzwasser, Paderborn 2013, p. 624.
- Bernard Peugniez: Guide Routier de l’Europe Cistercienne. Editions du Signe, Strasbourg 2012, p. 477.
- Peter Pfister: Klosterführer aller Zisterzienserklöster im deutschsprachigen Raum. 2nd edition, Kunstverlag Josef Fink, Lindenberg 1998, p. 434.
- Thomas Sterba: Herders Neues Klösterlexikon. Freiburg im Breisgau 2010, pp. 200f.
- Harm Wiemann: Geschichte des Zisterzienser-Nonnenklosters Frankenhausen bei Crimmitschau. Raab, Crimmitschau 1938.
