= Wolf-Dieter Storl =

German-American cultural anthropologist, ethnobotanist and book author

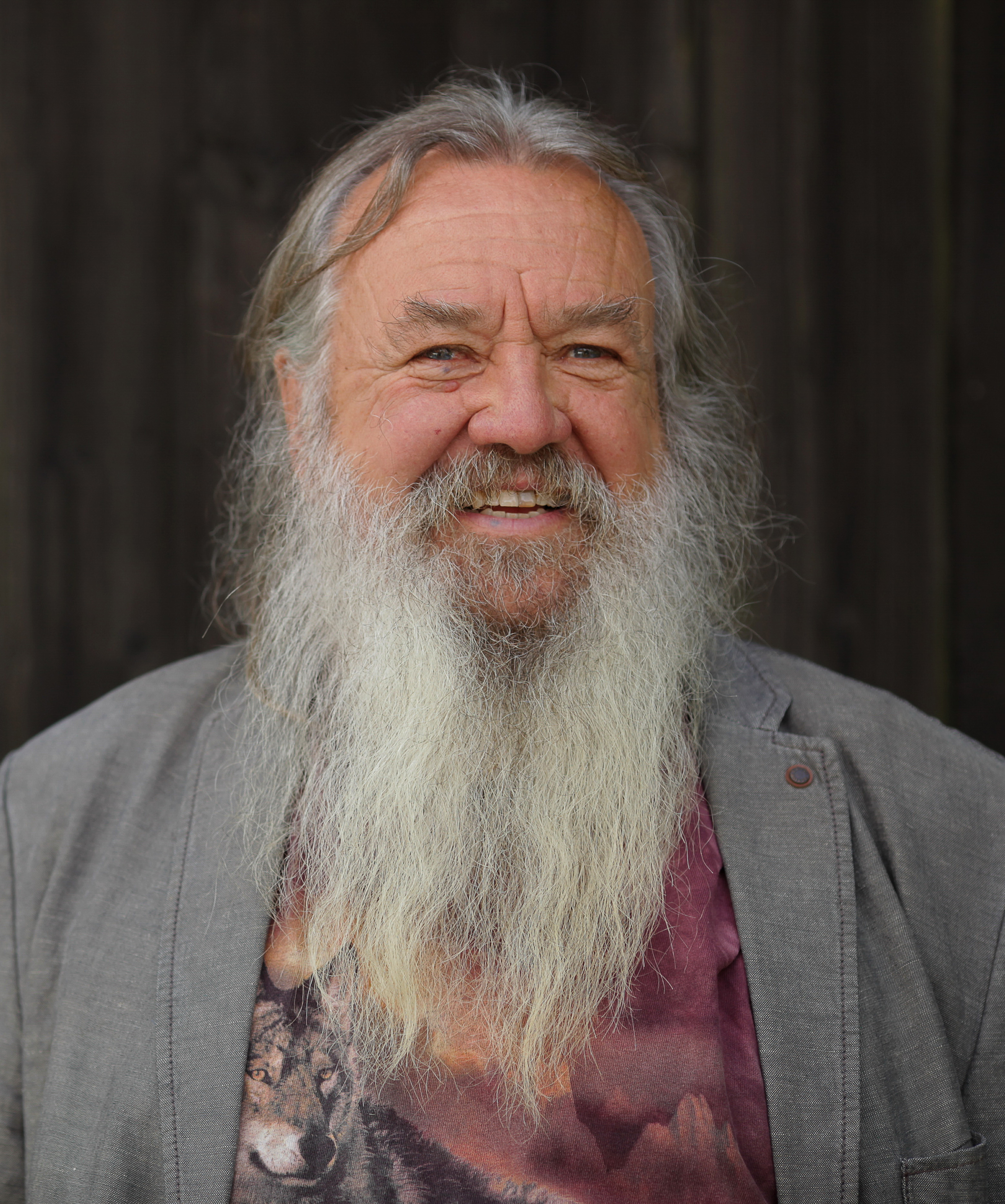
- Storl in 2016
- Born: October 1, 1942 (age 83); Crimmitschau, Saxony, Germany
- Occupations: Cultural anthropologist; Ethnobotanist; Book author
- Children: 2
- Website: Personal website (in German)

Wolf-Dieter Storl (born October 1, 1942) is a German-American cultural anthropologist, ethnobotanist and book author who promotes anthroposophy and esoteric ideas.

== Life ==
Wolf-Dieter Storl was born on October 1, 1942, in Crimmitschau, Saxony, Germany.

He grew up in Germany. At the age of eleven, in 1951, Storl immigrated to the United States with his parents and lived in rural Ohio until his studies. There, he became interested in nature, forests and plants.

Storl is married to an American from Wyoming. They have a son and a daughter. The family lives on a remote farm in the western part of the Allgäu. The courtyard is a former knight's seat built in 1188 and hidden in the forest.

== Criticism ==
Storl's support for curing Lyme disease with naturopathy, which he presents in his book Borreliose natürlich heilen (Cure Lyme disease naturally) – a disease Storl himself states to suffer from – attracted some criticism.

Storl's views on the climate crisis in an interview on the website KenFM has been met with criticism.

== Publications ==
=== Books ===
- Der Garten als Mikrokosmos. Biologische Naturgeheimnisse als Weg zur besseren Ernte. 2. Auflage. Verlag Hermann Bauer, Freiburg im Breisgau 1988, ISBN 3-7626-0353-7.
- with M. Scheffer: Die Seelenpflanzen des Edward Bach. 3. Auflage. Hugendubel, 1995, ISBN 3-88034-821-9.
- Von Heilkräutern und Pflanzengottheiten. Aurum, Braunschweig 1997, ISBN 3-591-08344-5.
- Kräuterkunde. Aurum, Braunschweig 1996, ISBN 3-591-08372-0.
- Götterpflanze Bilsenkraut. Nachtschatten Verlag, Solothurn 2000, ISBN 3-907080-63-7.
- Heilkräuter und Zauberpflanzen zwischen Haustür und Gartentor. AT-Verlag, Aarau (Schweiz) 2000, ISBN 3-85502-556-8.
- Pflanzendevas. AT-Verlag, Aarau 2002, ISBN 3-85502-763-3.
- with Claudia Müller-Ebeling, Christian Rätsch: Hexenmedizin. AT-Verlag, Aarau 1998, ISBN 3-85502-601-7.
- Pflanzen der Kelten. Heilkunde, Pflanzenzauber, Baumkalender. AT-Verlag, Aarau 2000, ISBN 3-85502-705-6.
- SHIVA. Der wilde, gütige Gott. KOHA, Burgrain, ISBN 3-929512-90-4.
- Bom Shiva. Der ekstatische Gott des Ganjas. Nachtschatten Verlag, Solothurn 2003, ISBN 3-03788-114-3.
- Ich bin ein Teil des Waldes. „Der Schamane aus dem Allgäu“ erzählt seine Lebensgeschichte. Franckh-Kosmos, Stuttgart, ISBN 3-440-09548-7.
- Naturrituale. Mit schamanischen Ritualen zu den eigenen Wurzeln finden. AT-Verlag, Aarau, ISBN 3-85502-964-4.
- Der Bär. Krafttier der Schamanen und Heiler. AT-Verlag, Baden/ München 2013, ISBN 978-3-03800-245-1.
- with Paul Silas Pfyl: Bekannte und vergessene Gemüse. AT-Verlag, Aarau 2002, ISBN 3-85502-808-7.
- Streifzüge am Rande Midgards. Geschichten aus meinem Leben. KOHA, Burgrain 2006, ISBN 3-936862-86-9.
- Borreliose natürlich heilen. AT-Verlag, Aarau 2007, ISBN 978-3-03800-360-1.
- Die Seele der Pflanzen. Botschaften und Heilkräfte aus dem Reich der Kräuter. Franckh-Kosmos, Stuttgart 2009, ISBN 978-3-440-11565-7.
- Mit Pflanzen verbunden. Meine Erlebnisse mit Heilkräutern und Zauberpflanzen. Wilhelm Heyne Verlag, München 2009, ISBN 978-3-453-70100-7.
- Erkenne dich selbst in der Natur. Gespräche unter dem Regenbogen aufgezeichnet von Rébecca Kunz. AT-Verlag, Baden/ München 2011, ISBN 978-3-03800-457-8.
- Wandernde Pflanzen. Neophyten die stillen Eroberer. Ethnobotanik, Heilkunde und Anwendungen. AT-Verlag, Aarau 2012, ISBN 978-3-03800-680-0.
- with Mechthild Scheffer: Die Seelenpflanzen des Edward Bach. Neue Einsichten in die Bach-Blütentherapie. Aurum in J. Kamphausen Verlag, Bielefeld 2012, ISBN 978-3-89901-655-0.
- Der Selbstversorger. Gräfe und Unzer Verlag, München 2013, ISBN 978-3-8338-2657-3.
- Die alte Göttin und ihre Pflanzen. Wie wir durch Märchen zu unserer Urspiritualität finden. Kailash, München 2014, ISBN 978-3-424-63080-0.
- Ur-Medizin. Die wahren Ursprünge unserer Volksheilkunde. AT-Verlag, Aarau/ München 2015, ISBN 978-3-03800-872-9.
- Der Selbstversorger. Mein Gartenjahr. Gräfe und Unzer, München 2016, ISBN 978-3-8338-5165-0.
- Mein amerikanischer Kulturschock: Meine Jugend unter Hillbillies, Blumenkindern und Rednecks. Kailash, München 2017, ISBN 978-3-424-63154-8.
- Die „Unkräuter“ in meinem Garten. 21 Pflanzenpersönlichkeiten erkennen & nutzen. Gräfe und Unzer, München 2018, ISBN 978-3-8338-6349-3.
- Wolfsmedizin: Eine Reise zu den Pflanzenheilkundigen in der Mongolei und Sibirien AT-Verlag, Aarau/ München 2018, ISBN 978-3-03800-058-7
- Wir sind Geschöpfe des Waldes: Warum wir untrennbar mit den Bäumen verbunden sind. Gräfe und Unzer, München 2019, ISBN 978-3-8338-6669-2.
- "Vom rechten Umgang mit heilenden Pflanzen", Bauer Verlag, Freiburg 1986, ISBN 3 7626 0303 0

=== Videos ===
- Rückkehr an den Ganges DVD, KOHA, 2013, ISBN 978-3-86728-215-4.
- Heilkräuter – Eine Wanderung auf den Spuren heimischer Pflanzen DVD, Neue Weltsicht, Potsdam 2012, EAN 4260155680977.
- Die lebendigen Götter! Eine Reise durch die mythische Welt DVD, Neue Weltsicht, Potsdam 2012, EAN 4260155680878.
- Das seelische Wesen der Pflanzen DVD, Neue Weltsicht, Potsdam 2011, EAN 4260155680311.
- Vergessenes Pflanzenwissen alter Kulturen DVD, Neue Weltsicht, Potsdam 2011, EAN 4260155680229.
- Heiler am Wegesrand. Kräuter- und Pflanzenwissen. DVD, Aurum, Braunschweig 2008, ISBN 978-3-89901-147-0.
