= Ferdinand von Rayski =

German artist

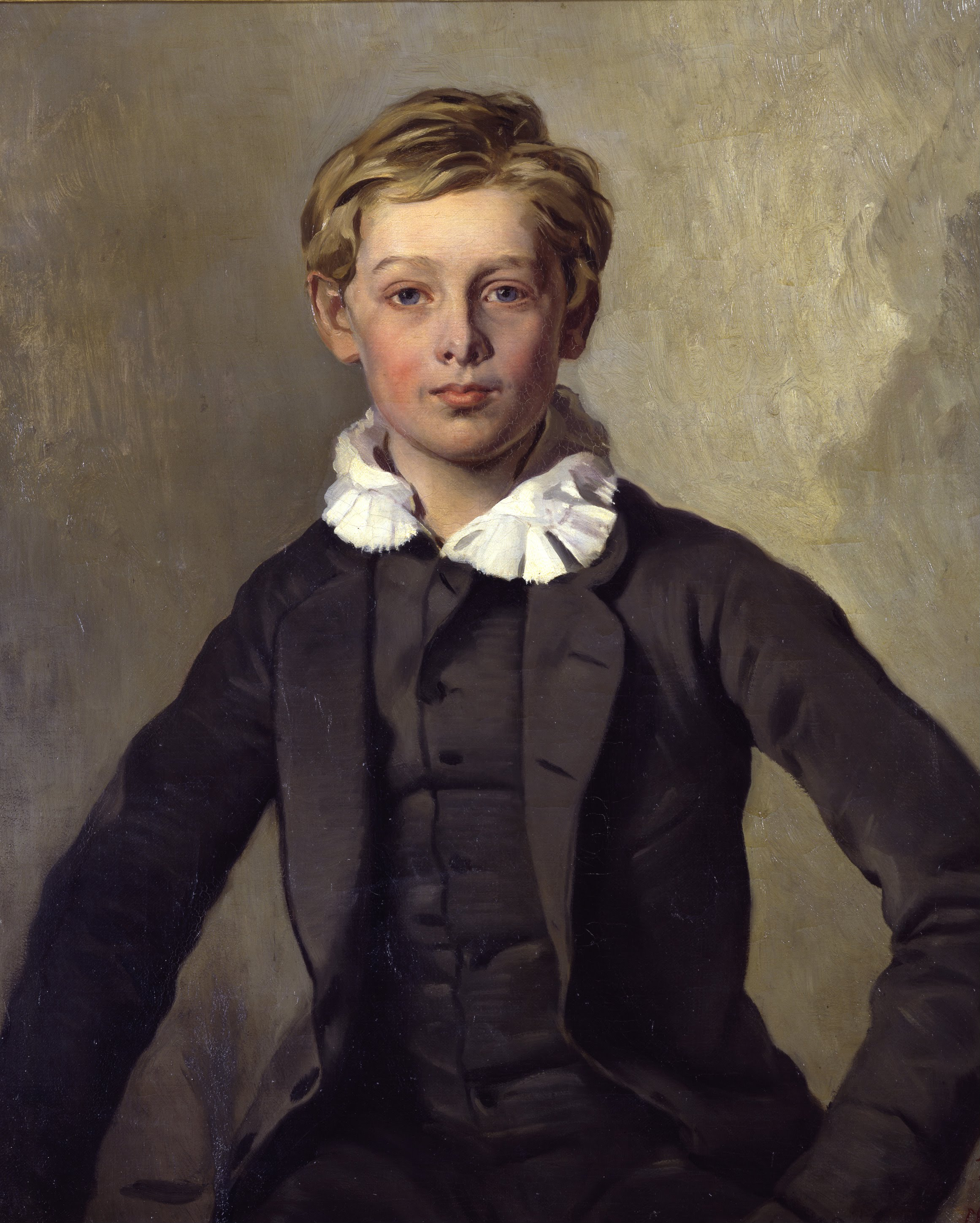
Count Haubold von Einsiedel, 1855

Louis Ferdinand von Rayski (1806–1890) was a German artist noted for portraits and landscapes. He is seen as the forerunner of Impressionism in Germany.

== Life ==
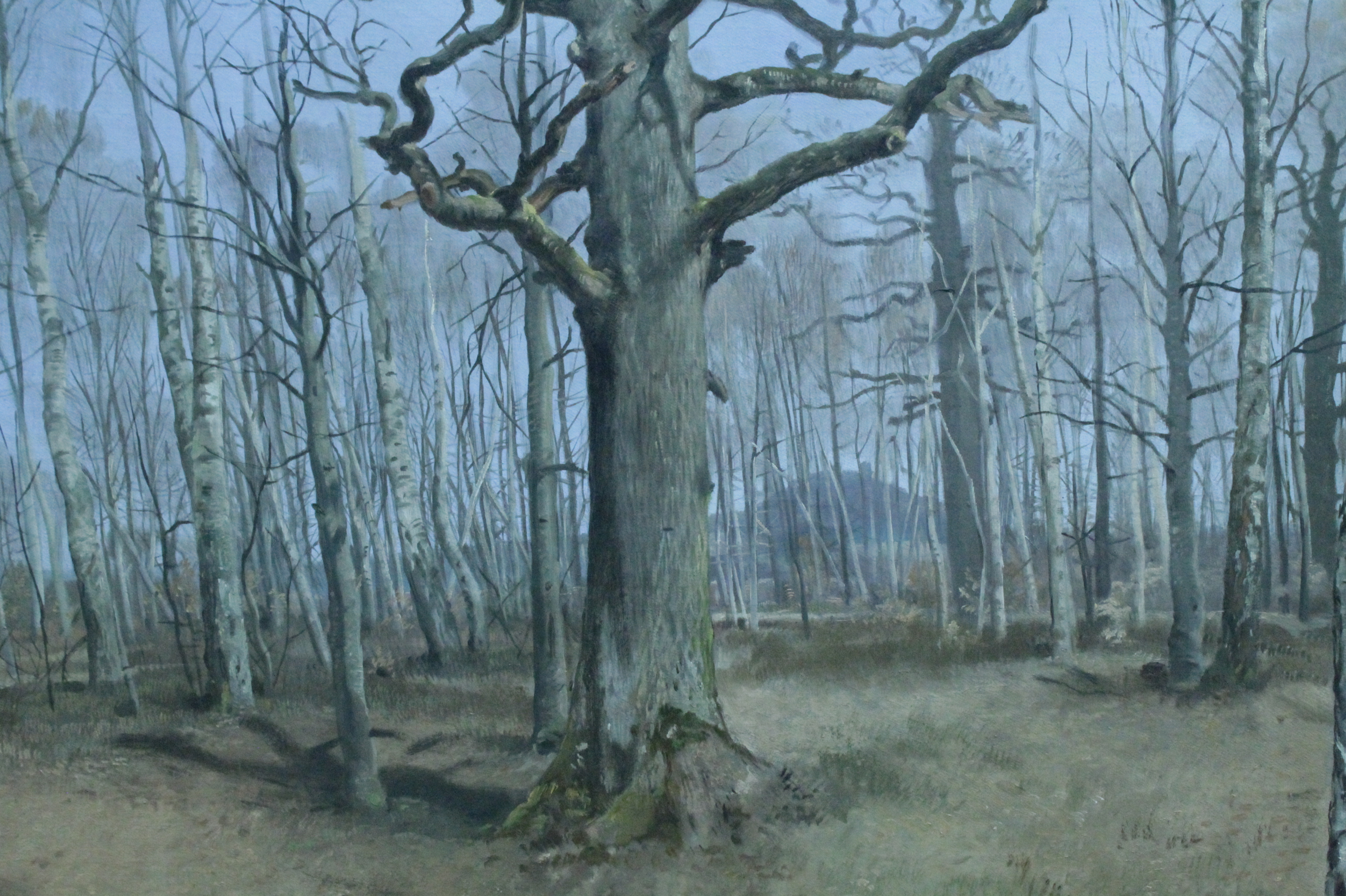
Wermsdorf Forest by Ferdinand von Rayski, Albertinum, Dresden

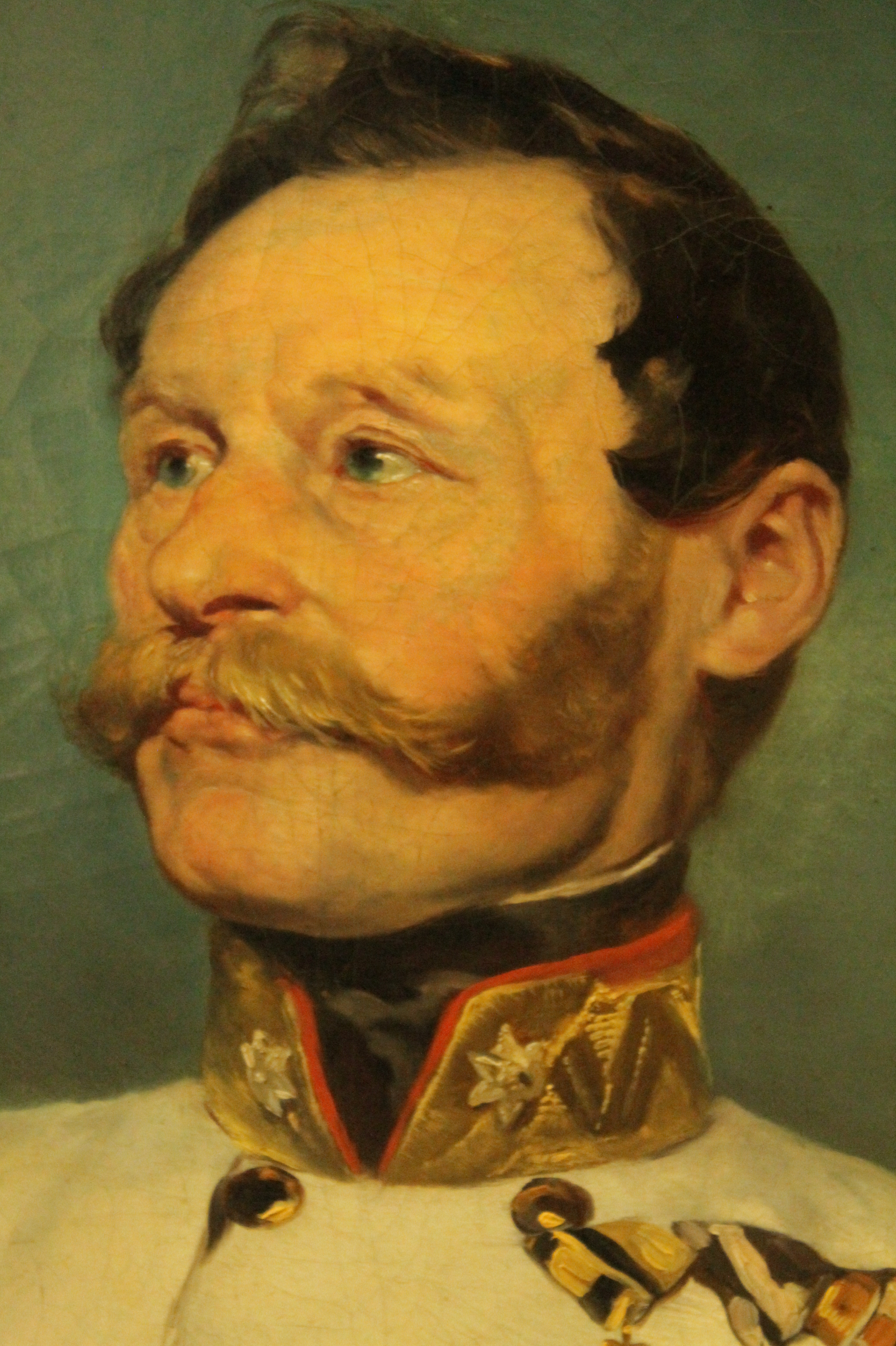
Major Leo von Rayski in 1857 (detail) (probably the artist's cousin) by Ferdinand von Rayski, Albertinum, Dresden

Von Rayski was born on 23 October 1806 in Pegau in Saxony into an aristocratic Rayski von Dubnitz family. He was son of Johann Karl Rayski von Dubnitz (1763-1813) and Sophie Eleonore Henriette Sichart von Sichartshoff (1776-1859).

From 1816 to 1821 he studied drawing under Traugott Faber at the Freimaurerinstitut in Dresden and from 1823 to 1825 studied at Dresden Academy of Fine Arts in Dresden. He began his career as a professional artist in 1829, painting portraits of his noble relatives in Hannover and Silesia. From 1831 to 1834 he lived in Dresden, where he received numerous portrait commissions. He traveled to Paris in 1834–35, and was influenced by the works of Delacroix, Géricault and Gros. Rayski gained a reputation as a distinguished portrait painter, but also produced animal and hunting scenes, as well as, yet less frequently, military, historical and mythological paintings.

He lived in Dresden from 1840 until his death on his 84th birthday in 1890. He is buried with his family in the Trinitatisfriedhof to the north-east of the city centre.

== Recognition ==
Rayskistrasse in Dresden is named after him.

== Gallery ==
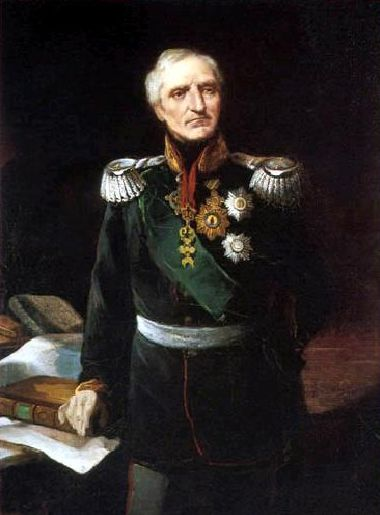
Portrait of King John of Saxony, 1870

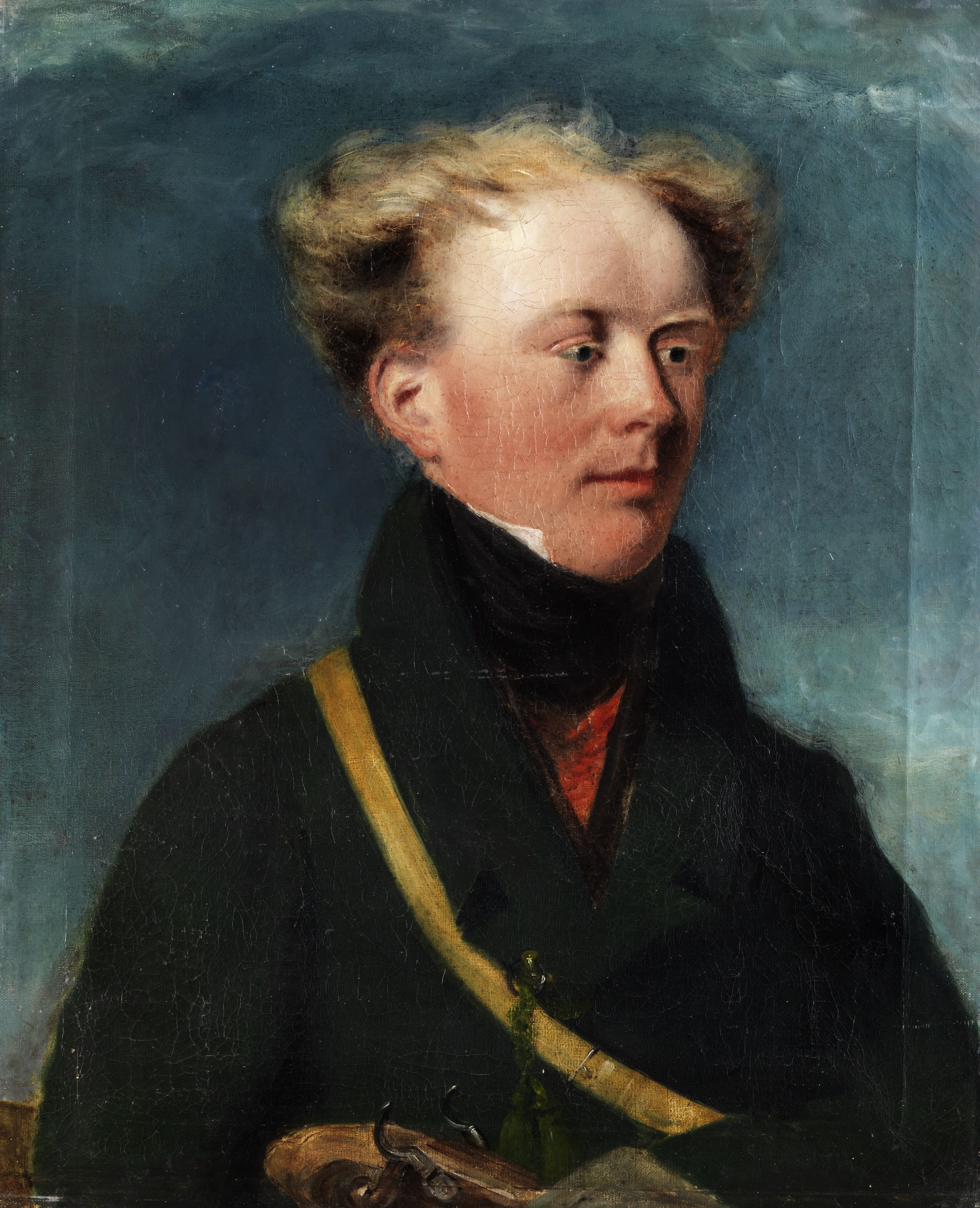
Eugen von Bardeleben, before 1884

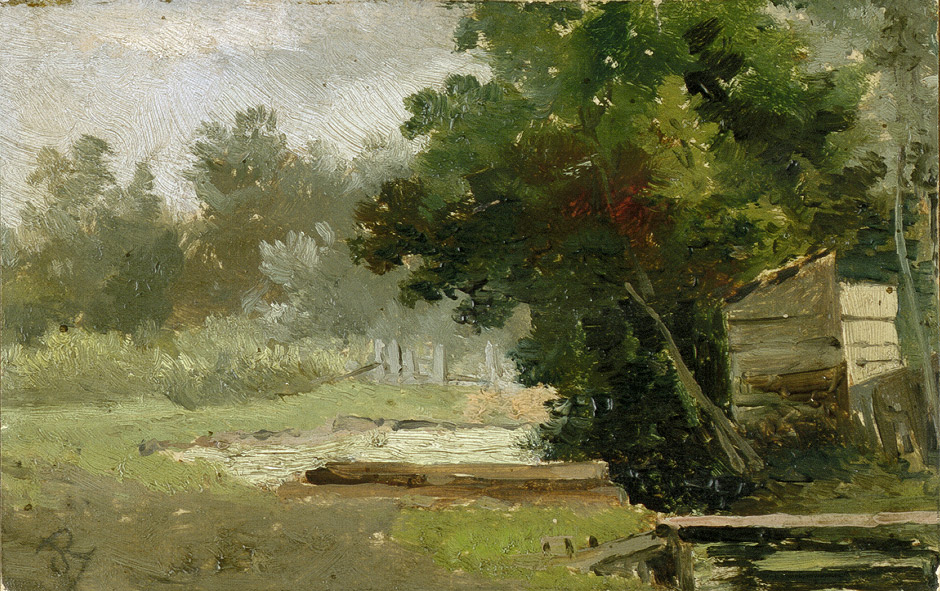
Landscape

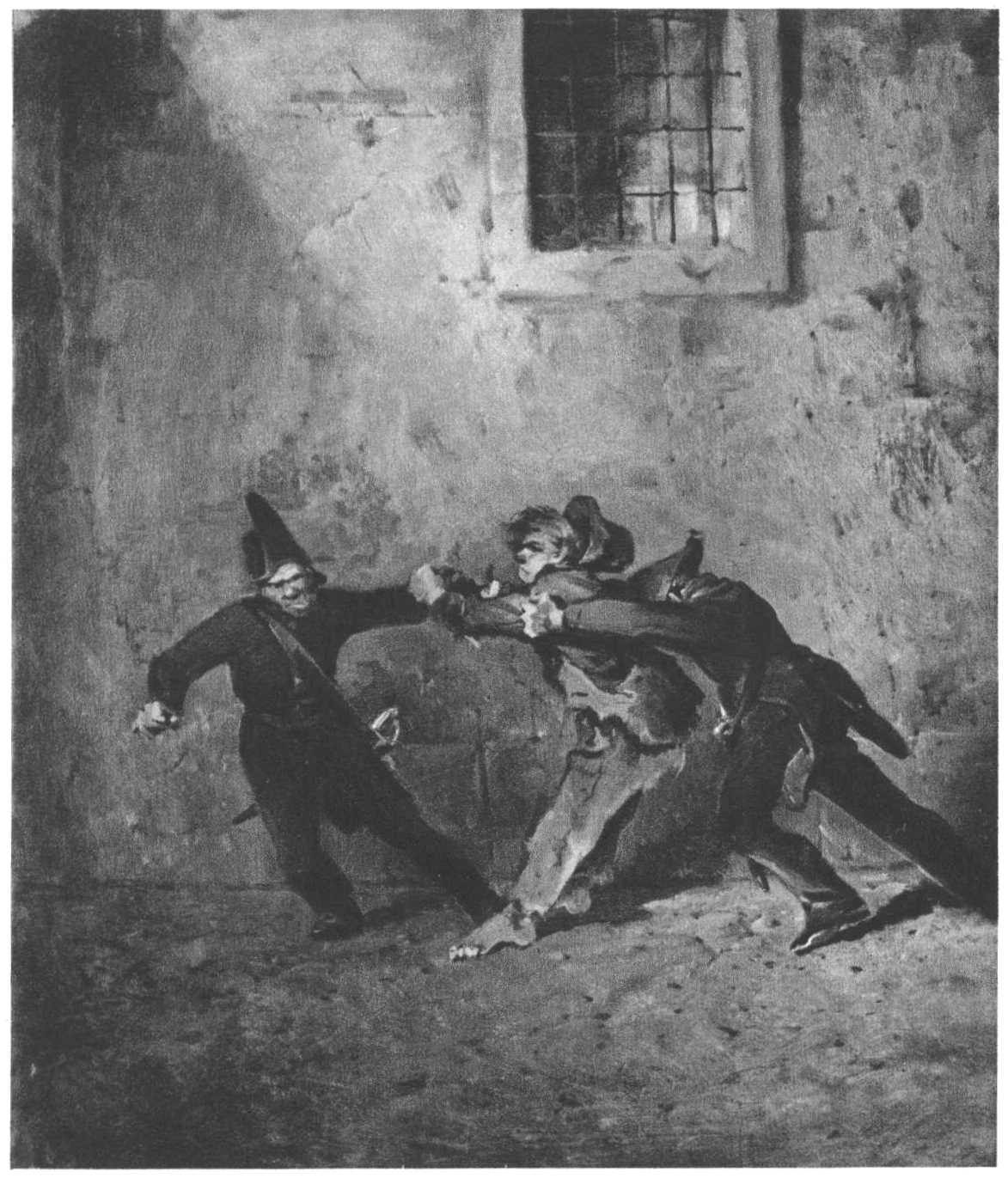
Der Strolch
