= Langheinrich =

Langheinrich is a German surname. Notable people with the surname include:

- Paul Langheinrich (1895–1979), German genealogist
- Ulf Langheinrich (born 1960), German visual artist and composer
