= Zwickau =

Town in Saxony, Germany

- Town
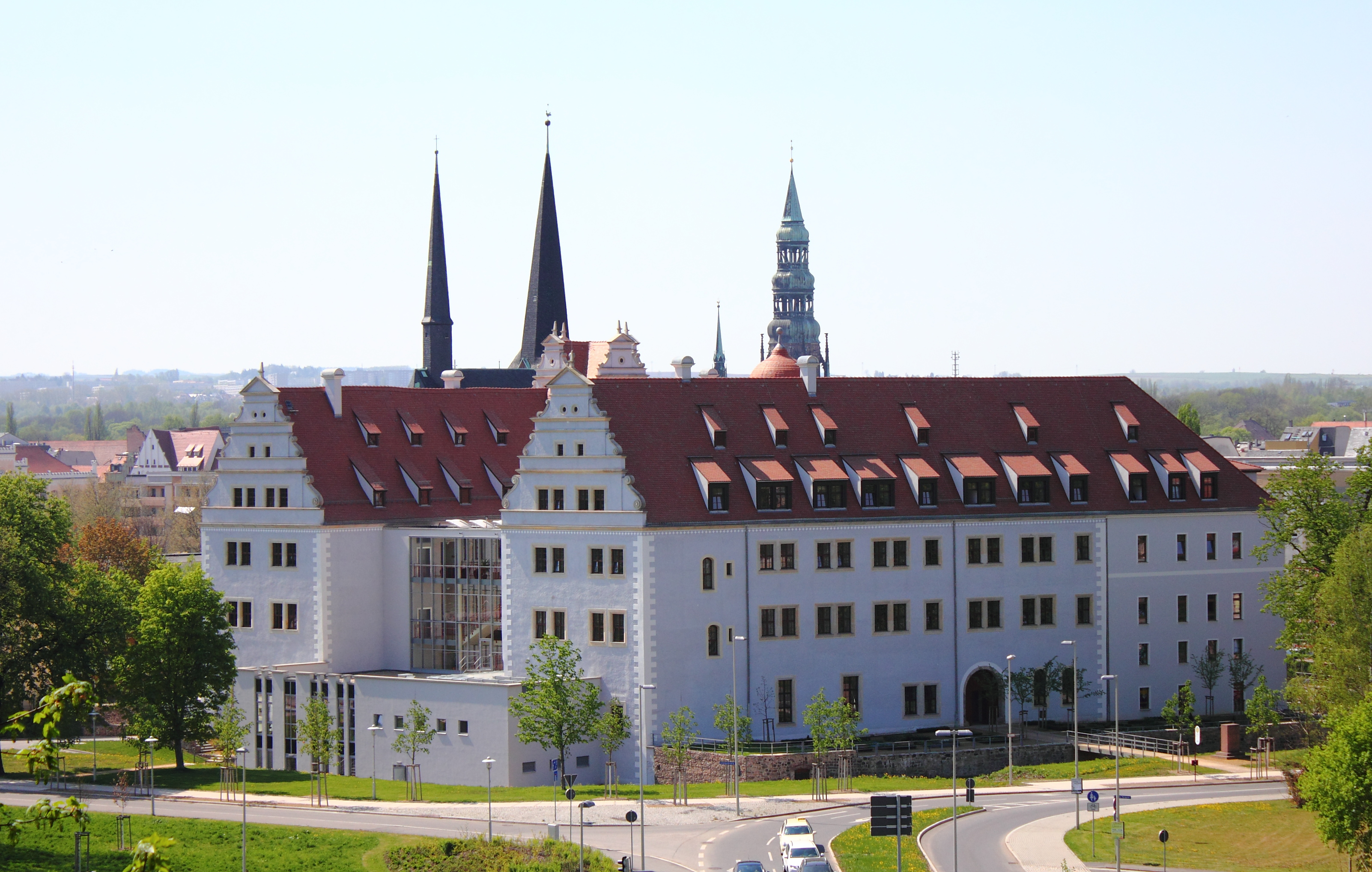
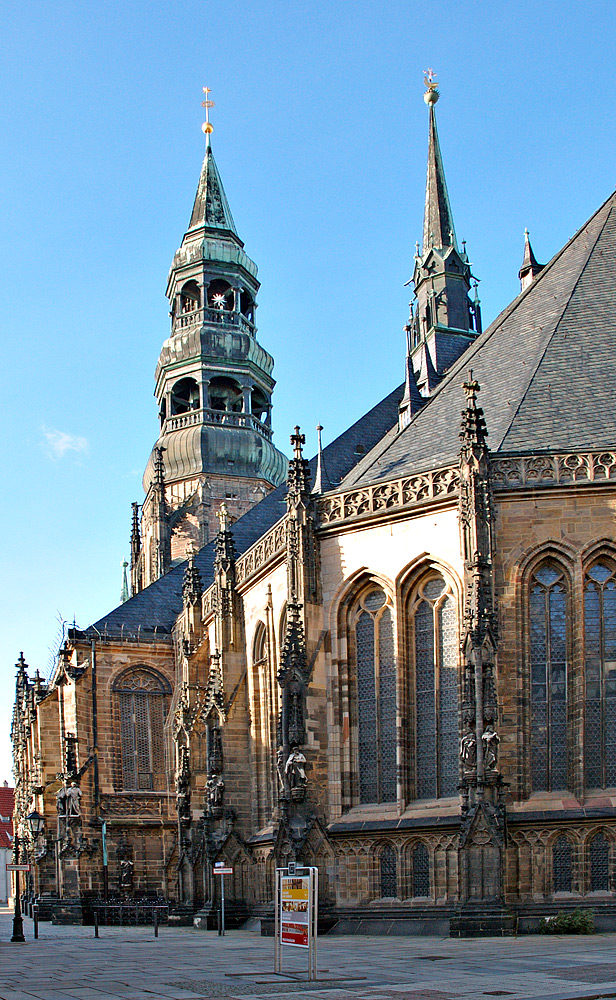
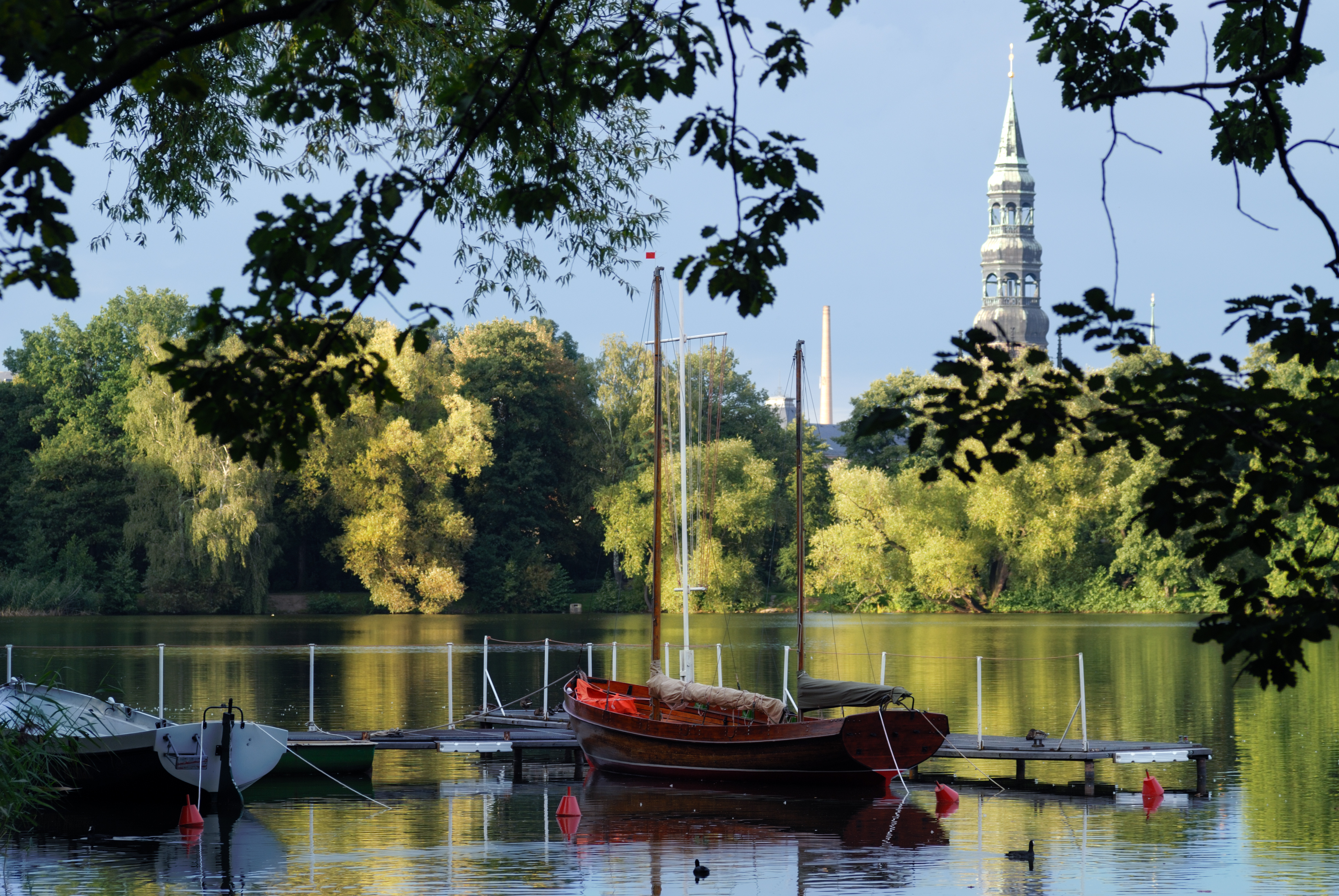
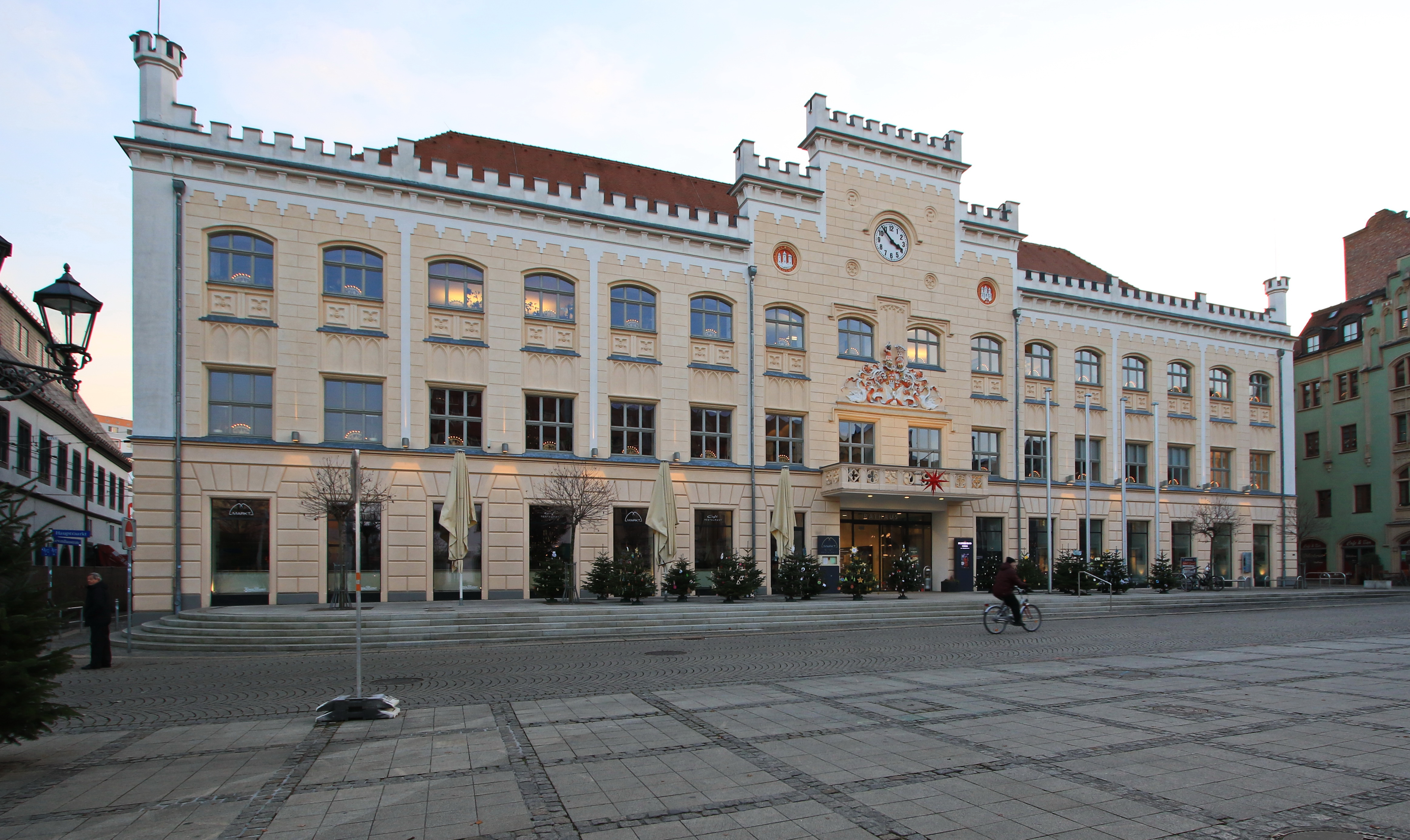
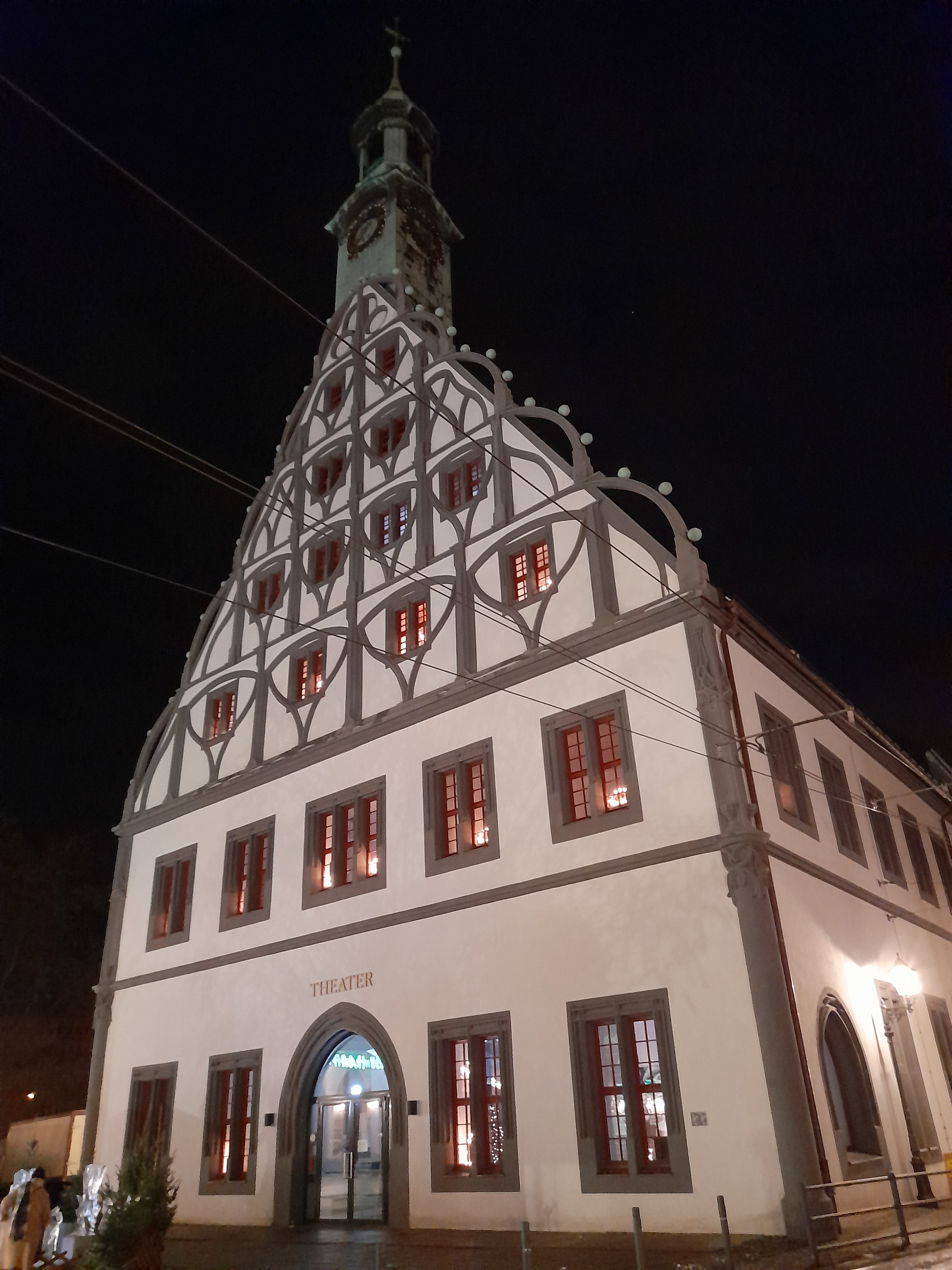
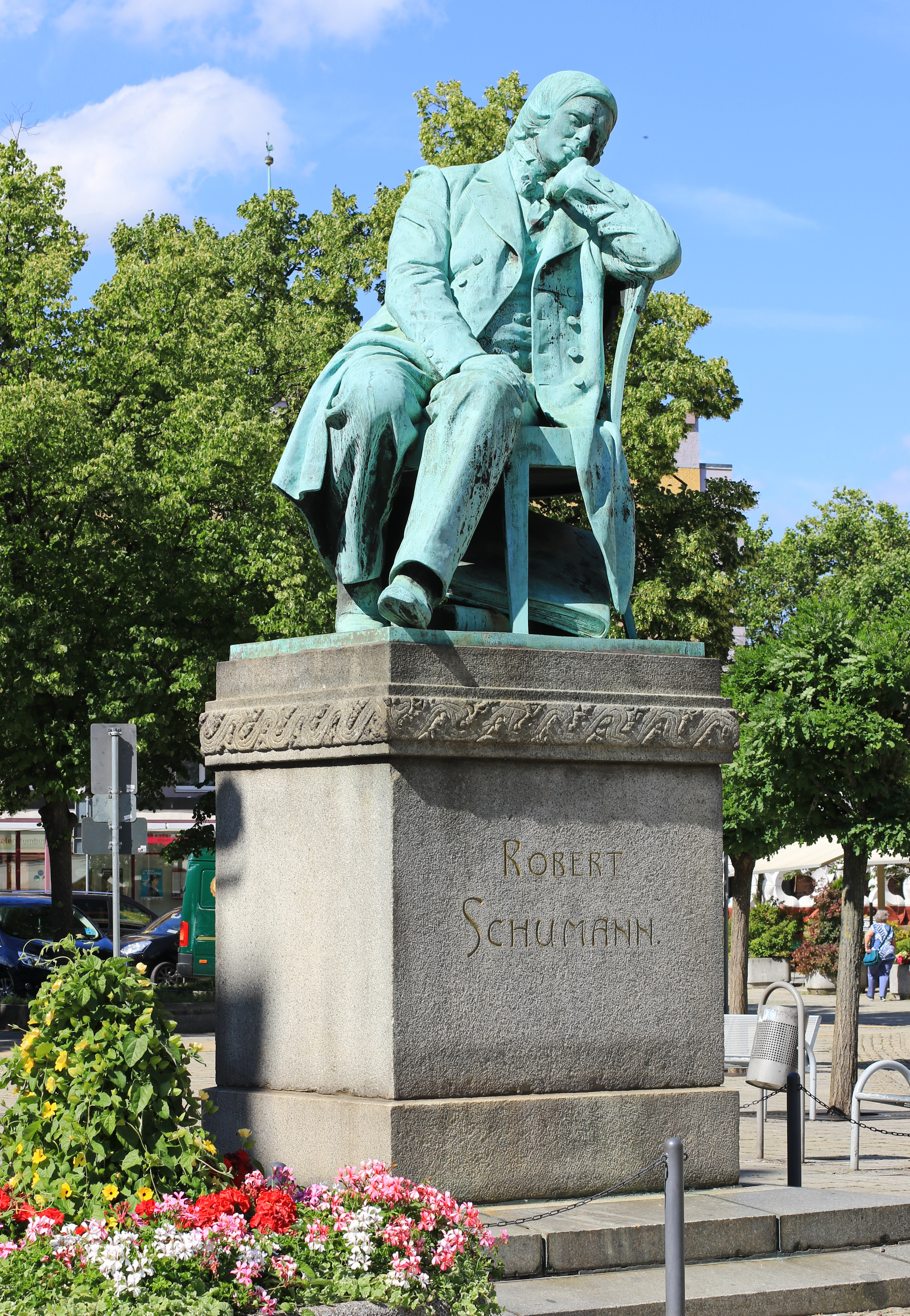
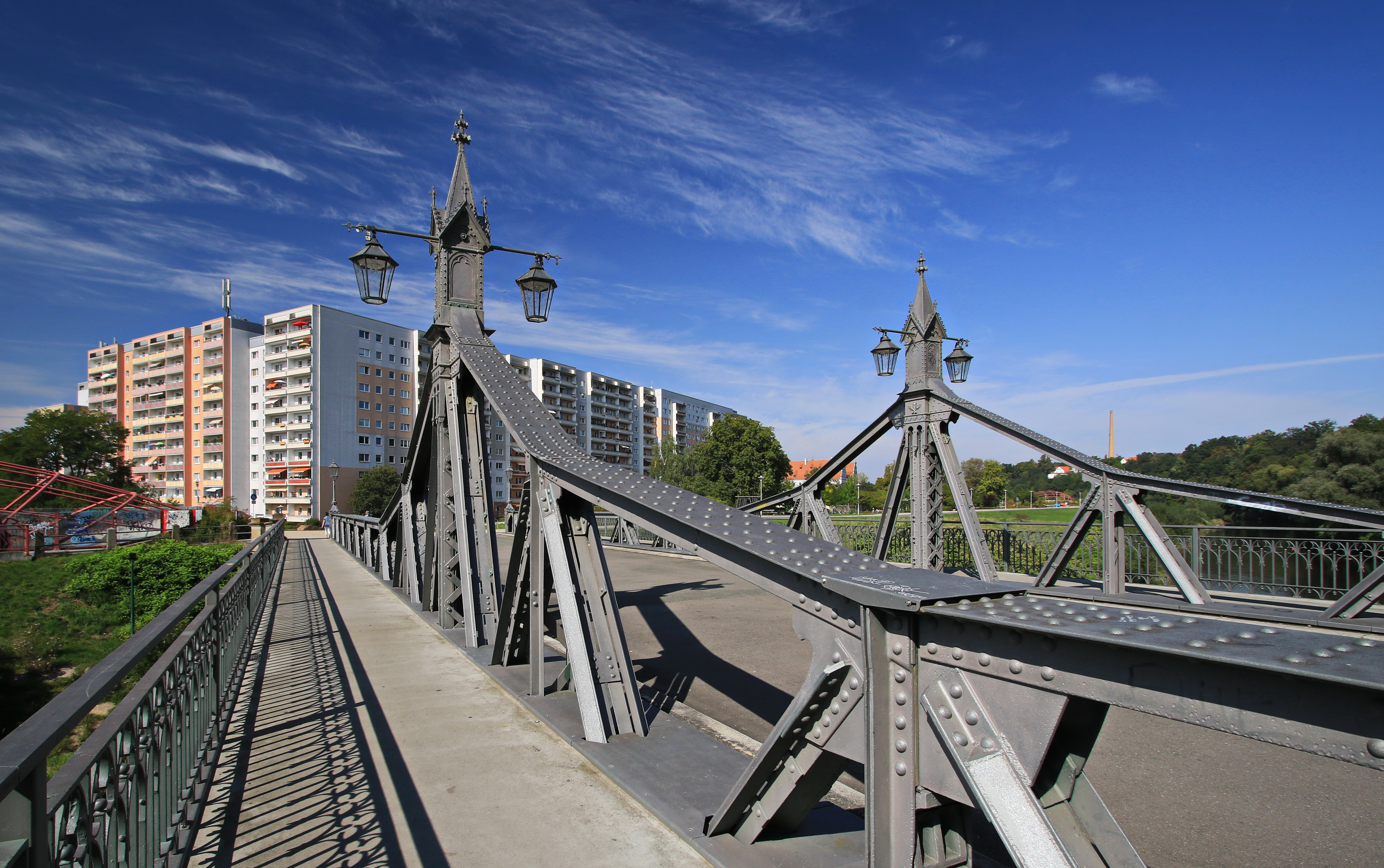
- Osterstein Castle Marienkirche Schwanenteich City Hall Theatre Robert Schumann Monument Paradiesbrücke

- Flag Coat of arms

- Location of Zwickau within Zwickau district
- Interactive map of Zwickau
- Location within Germany Location within Saxony
- Coordinates: 50°43′N 12°30′E
- Country: Germany
- State: Saxony
- District: Zwickau
- Subdivisions: 5 urban units with 35 townships

Government
  - Mayor (2020–27): Constance Arndt (BfZ)

Area
  - Total: 102.58 km^{2} (39.61 sq mi)

Population (2025-12-31)
  - Total: 86,405
  - Density: 842.32/km^{2} (2,181.6/sq mi)
- Time zone: UTC+01:00 (CET)
  - Summer (DST): UTC+02:00 (CEST)
- Postal codes: 08001–08067
- Dialling codes: 0375
- Vehicle registration: Z
- Website: zwickau.de

Zwickau (German pronunciation: [ˈtsvɪkaʊ]) is the fourth-largest city of Saxony, Germany, after Leipzig, Dresden and Chemnitz, with around 88,000 inhabitants.

The West Saxon city is situated in the valley of the Zwickau Mulde and lies in a string of cities sitting in the densely populated foreland of the Elster and Ore Mountains stretching from Plauen in the southwest via Zwickau, Chemnitz and Freiberg to Dresden in the northeast. Zwickau is the seat of the Zwickau District, the most densely populated district in the new states of Germany.

Zwickau is the seat of the Westsächsische Hochschule Zwickau - University of Applied Sciences Zwickau with campuses in Zwickau, Markneukirchen, Reichenbach im Vogtland and Schneeberg (Erzgebirge). The city is the birthplace of composer Robert Schumann.

Zwickau has historically been one of the centres of the German automotive industry. It is the cradle of Audi and its forerunner Horch. Horchwerke AG Zwickau was founded there in 1904 and was renamed to Audiwerke Zwickau AG in 1909. Zwickau was also the seat of VEB Sachsenring (now Sachsenring GmbH), which produced East Germany's most popular car, the Trabant, in Zwickau. Since 1990, there has been a large Volkswagen plant in Zwickau-Mosel.

The 167-kilometre-long (104-mile) Zwickau Mulde River, originating in Schöneck/Vogtl. in the Western Ore Mountains, traverses the city in a south-to-north direction. It enters Zwickau between Zwickau-Cainsdorf and Zwickau-Bockwa, and leaves at Zwickau-Schlunzig near the Volkswagen plant, and is spanned by 17 bridges within the city. The Silver Road, Saxony's longest tourist route, connects Dresden with Zwickau.

Zwickau can be reached by car via the nearby Autobahns A4 and A72, the main railway station (Zwickau Hauptbahnhof), a public airfield which serves light aircraft, and by bike along the Zwickau Mulde River on the so-called Mulderadweg.

== History ==
Map of Zwickau (around 1700)

The region around Zwickau was settled by Sorbs as early as the 7th century AD. The name Zwickau is probably a Germanization of the Sorbian toponym Šwikawa, which derives from Svarozič, the Slavic sun and fire god. In the 10th century, German settlers began arriving and the native Slavs were Germanized. A trading place known as terretorio Zcwickaw (in Medieval Latin) was mentioned in 1118. The settlement received a town charter in 1212, and hosted Franciscans and Cistercians during the 13th century. Zwickau was a free imperial city from 1290 to 1323, but was subsequently granted to the Margraviate of Meissen. Although regional mining began in 1316, extensive mining increased with the discovery of silver in the Schneeberg in 1470. Because of the silver ore deposits in the Erzgebirge, Zwickau developed in the 15th and 16th centuries and grew to be an important economic and cultural centre of Saxony.

Its nine churches include the Gothic church of St. Mary (1451–1536), with a spire 285 ft (87 m) high and a bell weighing 51 tons. The church contains an altar with wood carvings, eight paintings by Michael Wohlgemuth and a pietà in carved and painted wood by Peter Breuer.

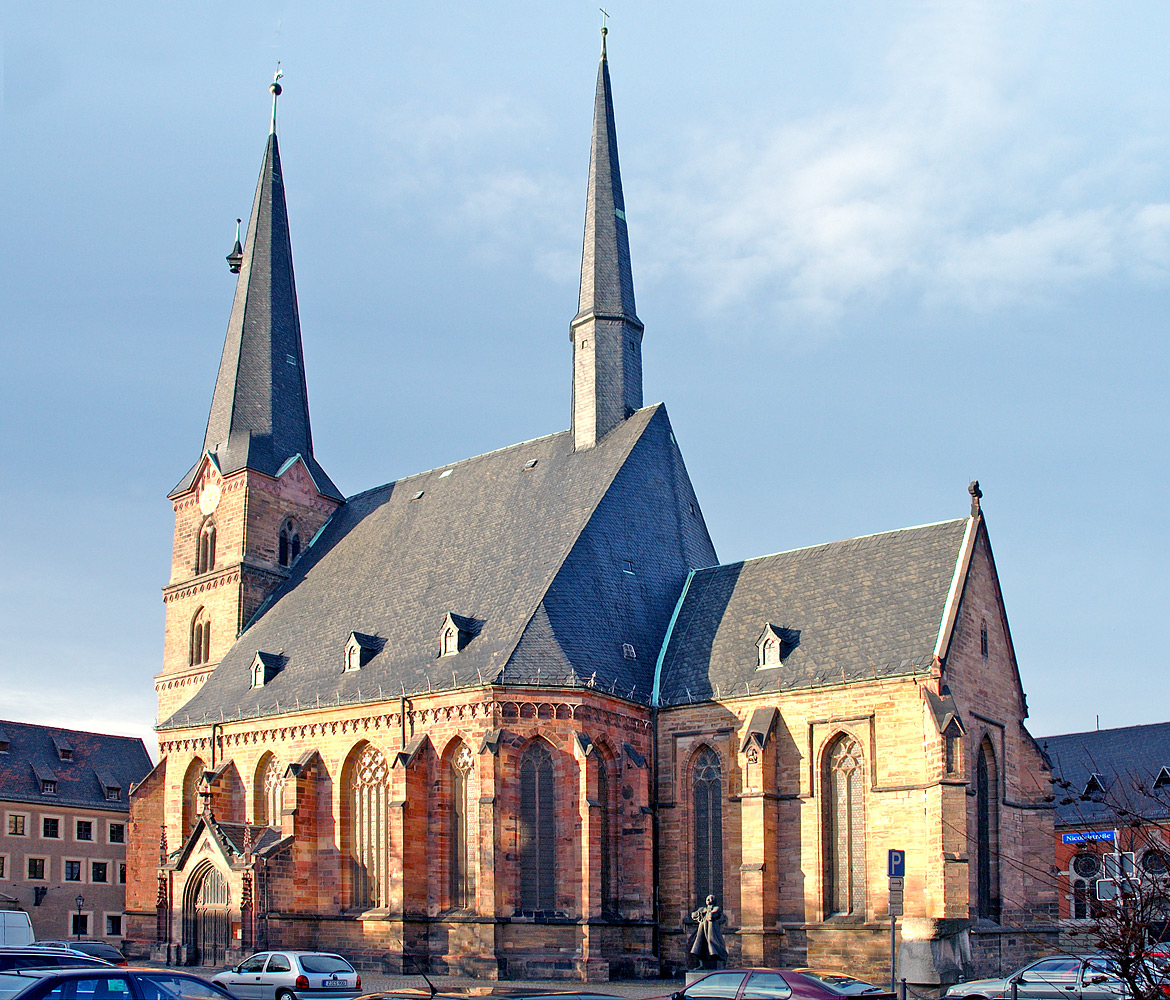
The late Gothic church of St. Catharine

The late Gothic church of St. Catharine has an altar piece ascribed to Lucas Cranach the elder, and is remembered because Thomas Müntzer was once pastor there (1520–22). The city hall was begun in 1404 and rebuilt many times since. The municipal archives include documents dating back to the 13th century.

Early printed books from the Middle Ages, historical documents, letters and books are kept in the City Archives (e.g. Meister Singer volumes by Hans Sachs (1494–1576)), and in the School Library founded by scholars and by the city clerk Stephan Roth during the Reformation.

In 1520 Martin Luther dedicated his treatise "On the Freedom of the Christian Man" to his friend Hermann Muehlpfort, the Lord Mayor of Zwickau. The Anabaptist movement of 1525 began at Zwickau under the inspiration of the "Zwickau prophets". After Wittenberg, it became the first city in Europe to join the Lutheran Reformation. The late Gothic Gewandhaus (cloth merchants' hall), was built in 1522–24 and is now converted into a theatre. The city was seriously damaged during the Thirty Years' War.

In the Old Town the Cathedral and the Gewandhaus (cloth merchants' hall) originate in the 16th century and when Schneeberg silver was traded. In the 19th century the city's economy was driven by industrial coal mining and later by automobile manufacturing.

During World War II, in 1942, a Nazi show trial of the members of the Czarny Legion Polish underground resistance organization from Gostyń was held in Zwickau, after which 12 members were executed in Dresden, and several dozen were imprisoned in Nazi concentration camps, where 37 of them died. In May 1942, five Polish students of the Salesian Oratory in Poznań, known as the Poznań Five or five of the 108 Blessed Polish Martyrs of World War II, were imprisoned in Zwickau, before being executed in Dresden. A subcamp of the Flossenbürg concentration camp was located in Zwickau, whose prisoners were mostly Poles and Russians, but also Italians, French, Hungarians, Jews, Czechs, Germans and others.

On 17 April 1945, US troops entered the city. They withdrew on 30 June 1945 and handed Zwickau to the Soviet Red Army. Between 1944 and 2003, the city had a population of over 100,000.

A major employer is Volkswagen which assembles its ID.3, ID.4 and ID.5 models, as well as Audi and Cupra EV's in the Zwickau-Mosel vehicle plant.

=== Economic history ===
==== Coal mining ====
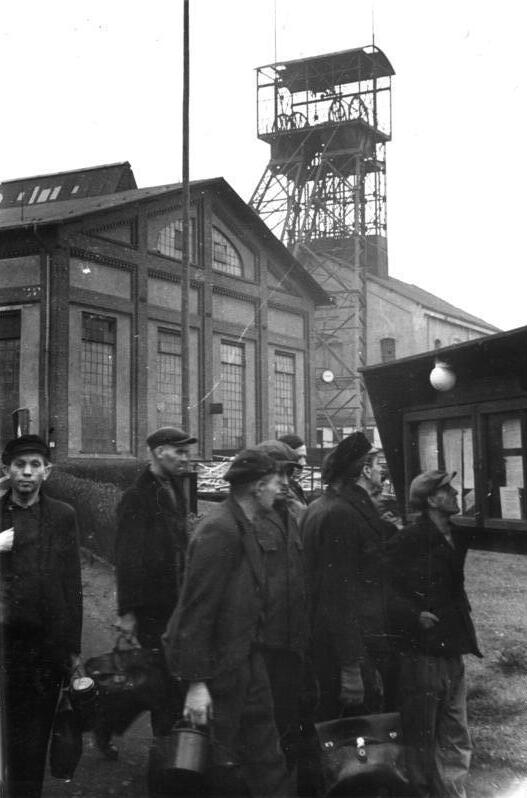
The Brückenberg I anthracite coal mine, later named Karl-Marx, here in 1948

Coal mining is mentioned as early as 1348. However, mining on an industrial scale first started in the early 19th century. The coal mines of Zwickau and the neighbouring Oelsnitz-Lugau coalfield contributed significantly to the industrialisation of the region and the city.

In 1885 Carl Wolf invented an improved gas-detecting safety mining-lamp. He held the first world patent for it. Together with his business partner Friemann he founded the "Friemann & Wolf" factory. Coal mining ceased in 1978. About 230 million tonnes had been mined to a depth of over 1,000 metres. In 1992 Zwickau's last coke oven plant was closed.

Many industrial branches developed in the city in the wake of the coal mining industry: mining equipment, iron and steel works, textile, machinery in addition to chemical, porcelain, paper, glass, dyestuffs, wire goods, tinware, stockings, and curtains. There were also steam saw-mills, diamond and glass polishing works, iron-foundries, and breweries.

==== Automotive industry ====
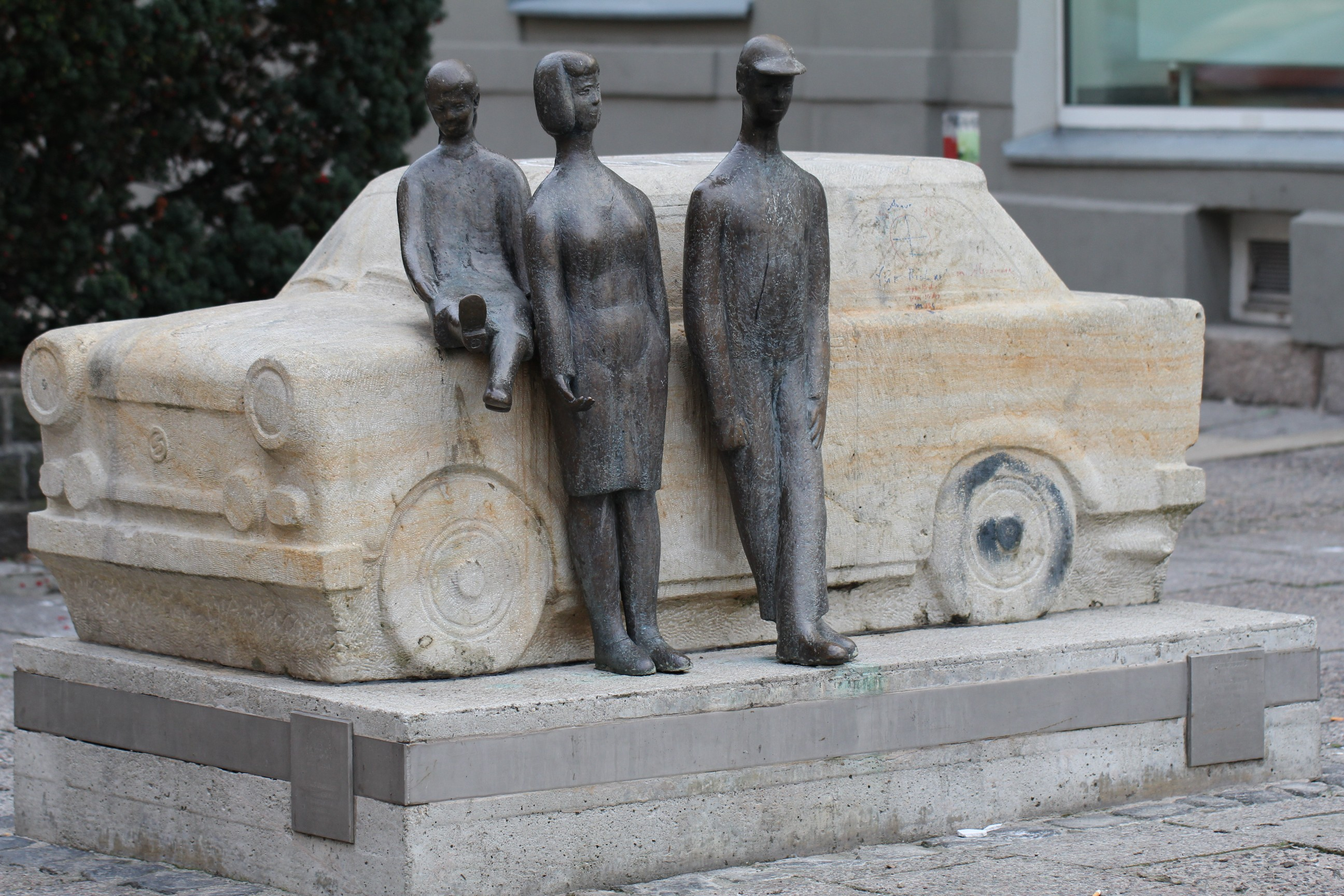
Monument to the Trabant on the Georgenplatz; the last were produced in 1991

In 1904 the Horch automobile plant was founded, followed by the Audi factory in 1909. In 1932 both brands were incorporated into Auto Union but retained their independent trademarks. Auto Union racing cars, developed by Ferdinand Porsche and Robert Eberan von Eberhorst, driven by Bernd Rosemeyer, Hans Stuck, Tazio Nuvolari, Ernst von Delius, became well known nationally and internationally. During World War II, the Nazi government operated a satellite camp of the Flossenbürg concentration camp in Zwickau which was sited near the Horch Auto Union plant. The Nazi administration built a hard labour prison camp at Osterstein Castle. Both camps were liberated by the US Army in 1945. On 1 August 1945 military administration was handed over to the Soviet Army. The Auto Union factories of Horch and Audi were dismantled by the Soviets; Auto Union relocated to Ingolstadt, Bavaria, evolving into the present day Audi company. In 1948 all large companies were seized by the East German government.

With the founding of the German Democratic Republic in 1949 in East Germany, post-war reconstruction began. In 1958 the Horch and Audi factories were merged into the Sachsenring plant. At the Sachsenring automotive plant the compact Trabant cars were manufactured. These small cars had a two-cylinder, two-stroke engine. The car was the first vehicle in the world to be industrially manufactured with a plastic car body. The production of the Trabant was discontinued after German reunification, but Volkswagen built a new factory in the nearby Mosel area to the north of the city and Sachsenring is now a supplier for the automobile industry. The former VEB Sachsenring manufacturing site was acquired by Volkswagen in 1990 and has since been redeveloped as an engine and transmission manufacturing facility. Nowadays the headquarters of Volkswagen-Saxony Ltd. (a VW subsidiary) is in the northern part of Zwickau.

Audi together with the city of Zwickau operates the August Horch Museum in the former Audi works. In 2021, production of the Audi Q4 e-tron began at the Zwickau-Mosel plant, marking the return of the manufacture of Audi badged cars in Zwickau for the first time in over 80 years.

==== Uranium mining ====
Two major industrial facilities of the Soviet SDAG Wismut were situated in the city: the uranium mill in Zwickau-Crossen, producing uranium concentrate from ores mined in the Erzgebirge and Thuringia, and the machine building plant in Zwickau-Cainsdorf producing equipment for the uranium mines and mills of East Germany. Uranium milling ended in 1989, and after the unification the Wismut machine building plant was sold to a private investor.

== Boundaries ==
Zwickau is bounded by Mülsen, Reinsdorf, Wilkau-Hasslau, Hirschfeld (Verwaltungsgemeinschaft Kirchberg), Lichtentanne, Werdau, Neukirchen, Crimmitschau, Dennheritz (Verwaltungsgemeinschaft Crimmitschau), and the city of Glauchau.

== Incorporations ==
- 1895: Pölbitz
- 1902: Marienthal
- 1905: Eckersbach
- 1922: Weissenborn
- 1923: Schedewitz
- 1939: Brand and Bockwa
- 1944: Oberhohndorf and Planitz
- 1953: Auerbach, Pöhlau, and Niederhohndorf
- 1993: Hartmannsdorf
- 1996: Rottmannsdorf
- 1996: Crossen (with 4 municipalities on 1 January 1994, Schneppendorf)
- 1999: Cainsdorf, Mosel, Oberrothenbach, and Schlunzig, along with Hüttelsgrün (Lichtentanne) and Freiheitssiedlung

== Population ==
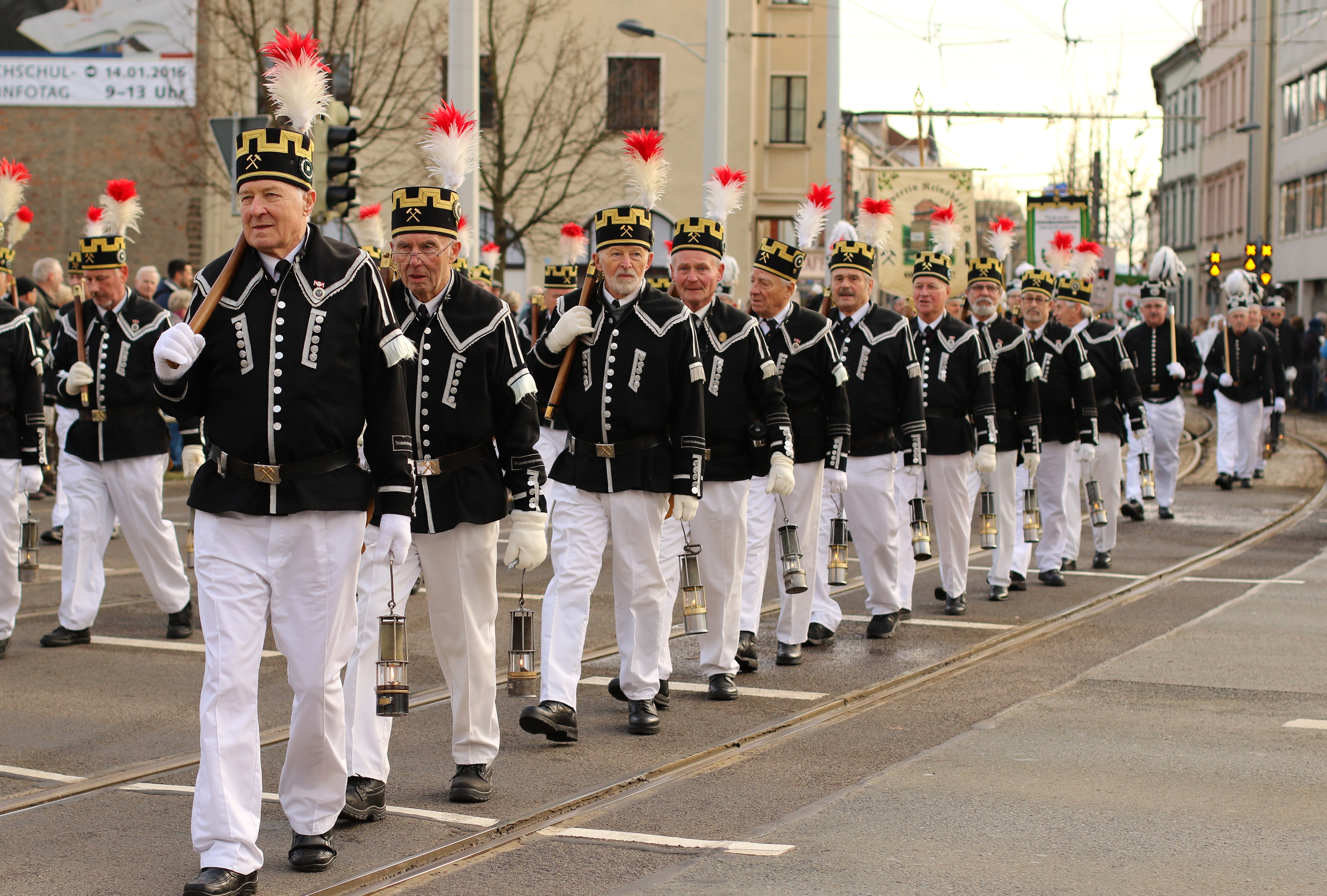
Bergparade in Zwickau, a Christmas tradition

Historical population
Year	Pop.	±%
1462	3,900	—
1530	7,677	+96.8%
1640	2,693	−64.9%
1723	3,753	+39.4%
1800	4,189	+11.6%
1840	9,740	+132.5%
1861	20,492	+110.4%
1871	27,322	+33.3%
1875	31,491	+15.3%
1890	44,198	+40.4%
1900	55,825	+26.3%
1905	68,502	+22.7%
1910	73,542	+7.4%
1925	80,358	+9.3%
1933	84,701	+5.4%
1939	85,198	+0.6%
1946	122,862	+44.2%
1950	138,844	+13.0%
1960	129,138	−7.0%
1972	124,796	−3.4%
1981	121,800	−2.4%
1990	122,979	+1.0%
2001	101,726	−17.3%
2011	93,081	−8.5%
2022	87,020	−6.5%
Source: Census data for 1875 to 1939

== Education ==
Zwickau is home to the University of Applied Sciences Zwickau, with about 4,700 students and two campuses within the boundaries of Zwickau.

Dr. Martin Luther School (German: Dr. Martin Luther Schule) is a grade 1–4 school of the Evangelical Lutheran Free Church in Zwickau.

== Politics ==
=== Mayor and city council ===
The first freely elected mayor after German reunification was Rainer Eichhorn of the Christian Democratic Union (CDU), who served from 1990 to 2001. The mayor was originally chosen by the city council, but since 1994 has been directly elected. Dietmar Vettermann, also of the CDU, served from 2001 until 2008. He was succeeded by Pia Findeiß of the Social Democratic Party (SPD), who was in office until 2020. The most recent mayoral election was held on 20 September 2020, with a runoff held on 11 October, at which Constance Arndt (Bürger für Zwickau) was elected.

Candidate	Party	First round		Second round	
Candidate	Party	Votes	%	Votes	%
Kathrin Köhler	Christian Democratic Union	9,453	31.5	7,549	28.1
Constance Arndt	Citizens for Zwickau	6,506	21.7	19,358	71.9
Andreas Gerold	Alternative for Germany	5,109	17.0	Withdrew	
Michael Jakob	Independent	4,797	16.0	Withdrew	
Ute Manuela Brückner	The Left	4,183	13.9	Withdrew	
Valid votes		30,048	99.3	26,907	99.1
Invalid votes		204	0.7	246	0.9
Total		30,252	100.0	27,153	100.0
Electorate/voter turnout		72,225	41.9	72,085	37.7
Source: City of Zwickau (1st round, 2nd round)

The most recent city council election was held on 9 June 2024, and the results were as follows:

Party	Votes	%	±	Seats	±
Alternative for Germany (AfD)	38,740	32.3	▲10.4	16	▲5
Christian Democratic Union (CDU)	24,937	20.8	▼1.2	10	▼1
Sahra Wagenknecht Alliance (BSW)	15,593	13.0	New	6	New
Citizens for Zwickau (BfZ)	14,970	12.5	▲1.8	6	▲1
Social Democratic Party (SPD)	8,304	6.9	▼3.3	3	▼2
The Left (Die Linke)	5,312	4.4	▼10.3	2	▼6
Alliance 90/The Greens (Grüne)	3,823	3.2	▼3.3	2	▼1
Free Democratic Party (FDP)	3,702	3.1	▼2.5	1	▼2
Free Saxons (FS)	2,823	2.4	New	1	New
Shaping Zwickau Together (2ZG)	1,816	1.5	New	1	New
Valid votes	120,020	100.0			
Total ballots	42,623	100.0		48	±0
Electorate/voter turnout	68,766	62.0	▲7.0		
Source: City of Zwickau

=== Historical mayors ===
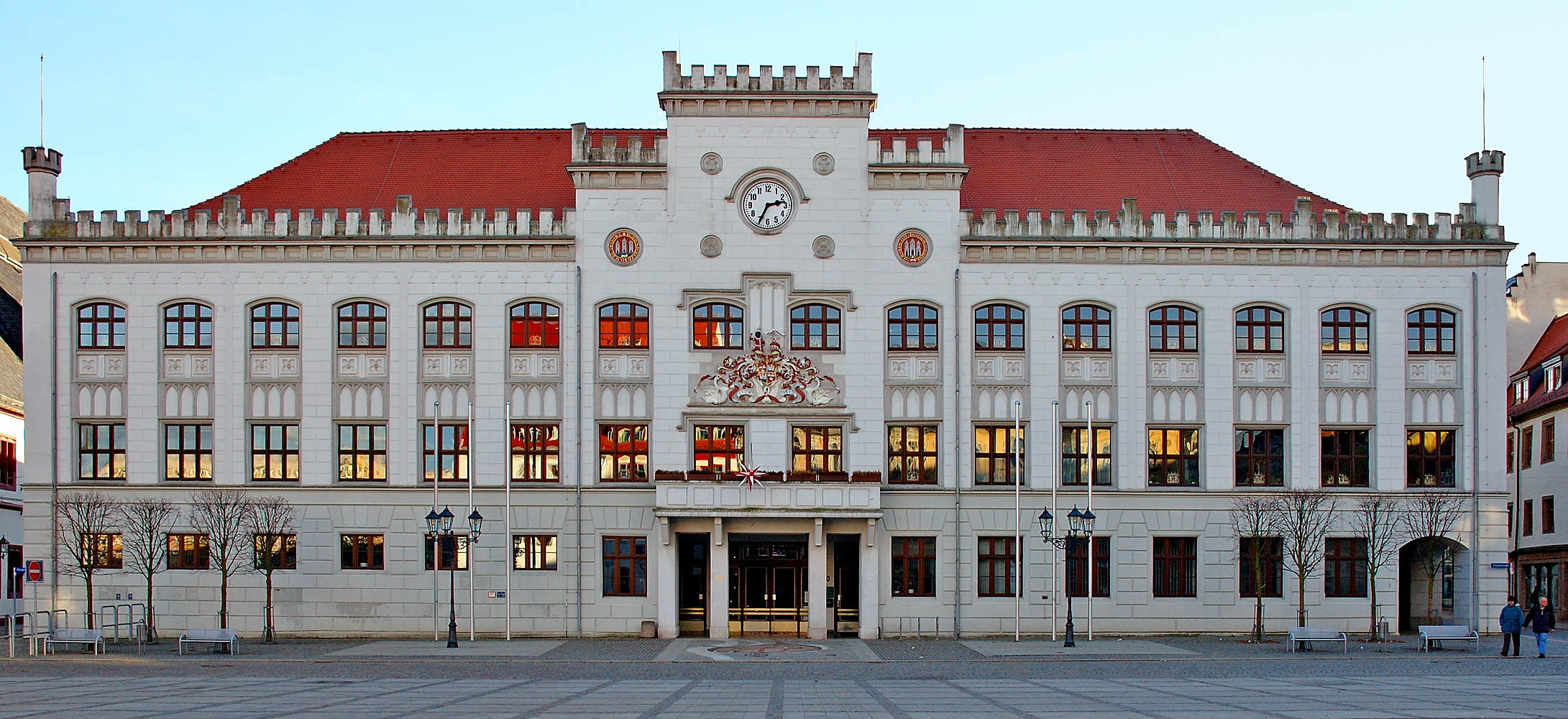
City hall, main façade from 1866 to 1867 and earlier

- 1501–1518: Erasmus Stella
- 1518–1530: Hermann Mühlpfort
- 1800, 1802, 1804, 1806, 1808, 1810, 1812, 1814: Carl Wilhelm Ferber
- 1801, 1803, 1805, 1807, 1809, 1811, 1813, 1815, 1817, 1819: Tobias Hempel
- 1816, 1818, 1820, 1822: Christian Gottlieb Haugk
- 1821, 1823, 1825, 1826: Carl Heinrich Rappius
- 1824: Christian Heinrich Pinther
- 1827–1830: Christian Heinrich Mühlmann, Stadtvogt
- 1830–1832: Franz Adolf Marbach
- 1832–1860: Friedrich Wilhelm Meyer
- 1860–1898: Lothar Streit, from 1874 Lord Mayor
- 1898–1919: Karl Keil
- 1919–1934: Richard Holz
- 1934–1945: Ewald Dost
- 1945: Fritz Weber (acting Lord Mayor)
- 1945: Georg Ulrich Handke (1894–1962) (acting Lord Mayor)
- 1945–1949: Paul Müller
- 1949–1954: Otto Assmann (1901–1977)
- 1954–1958: Otto Schneider
- 1958–1969: Gustav Seifried
- 1969–1973: Liesbeth Windisch
- 1973–1977: Helmut Repmann
- 1977–1990: Heiner Fischer (1936–2016)
- 1990–2001: Rainer Eichhorn (born 1950)
- 2001–2008: Dietmar Vettermann (born 1957)
- 2008–2020: Pia Findeiss (born 1956)
- 2020 until now: Constance Arndt (born 1977)

== Transport ==
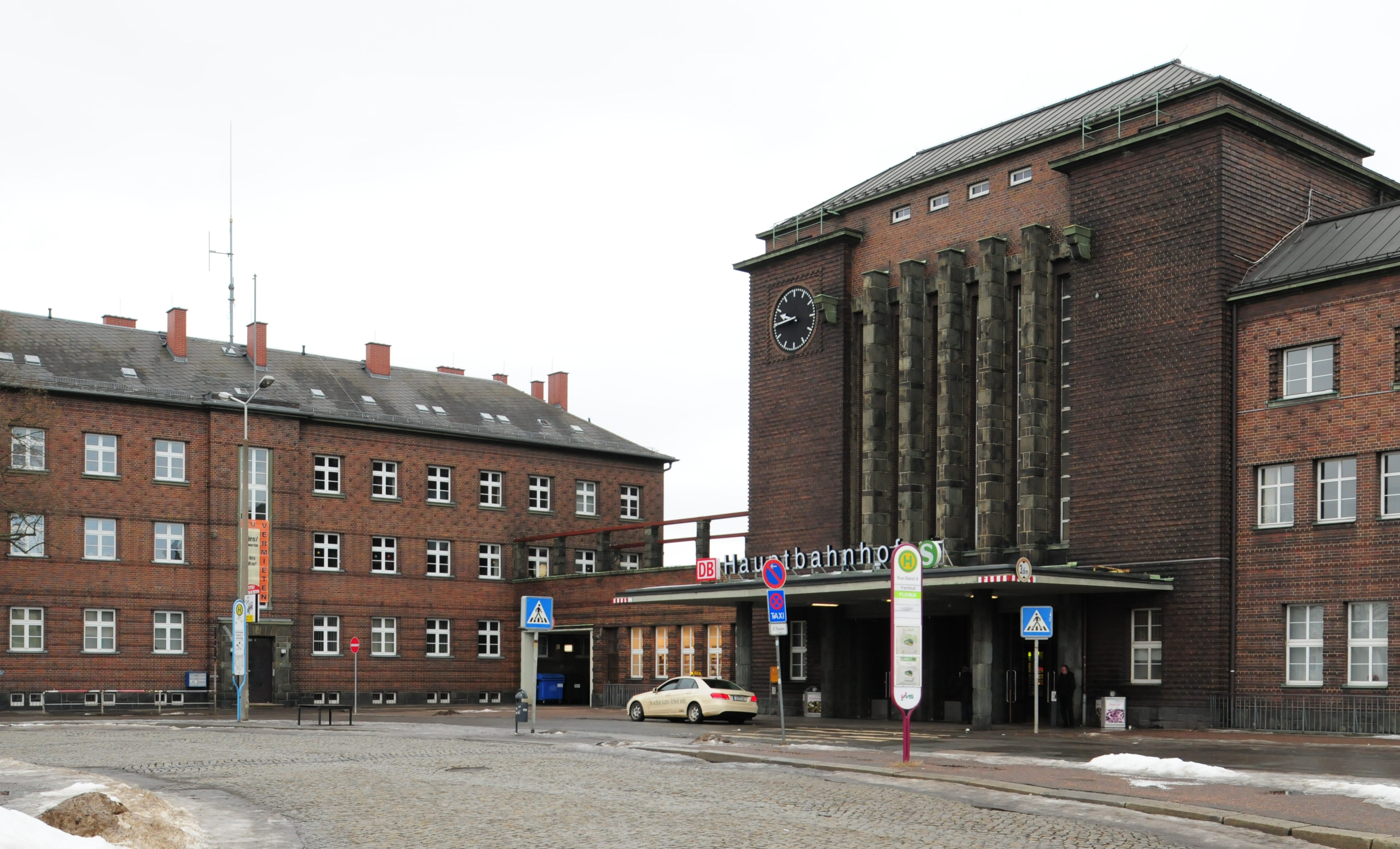
Main railway station

The city is close to the A4 (Dresden-Erfurt) and A72 (Hof-Chemnitz) Autobahns.

Zwickau Hauptbahnhof is on the Dresden–Werdau line, part of the Saxon-Franconian trunk line, connecting Nuremberg and Dresden. There are further railway connections to Leipzig as well as Karlovy Vary and Cheb in the Czech Republic. The core element of Zwickau's urban public transport system is the Zwickau tramway network; the system is also the prototype of the so-called Zwickau Model for such systems.

The closest airport is Leipzig-Altenburg, which has no scheduled commercial flights. The nearest major airports are Leipzig/Halle Airport and Dresden Airport, both of which offer a large number of national and international flights.

== Museums ==
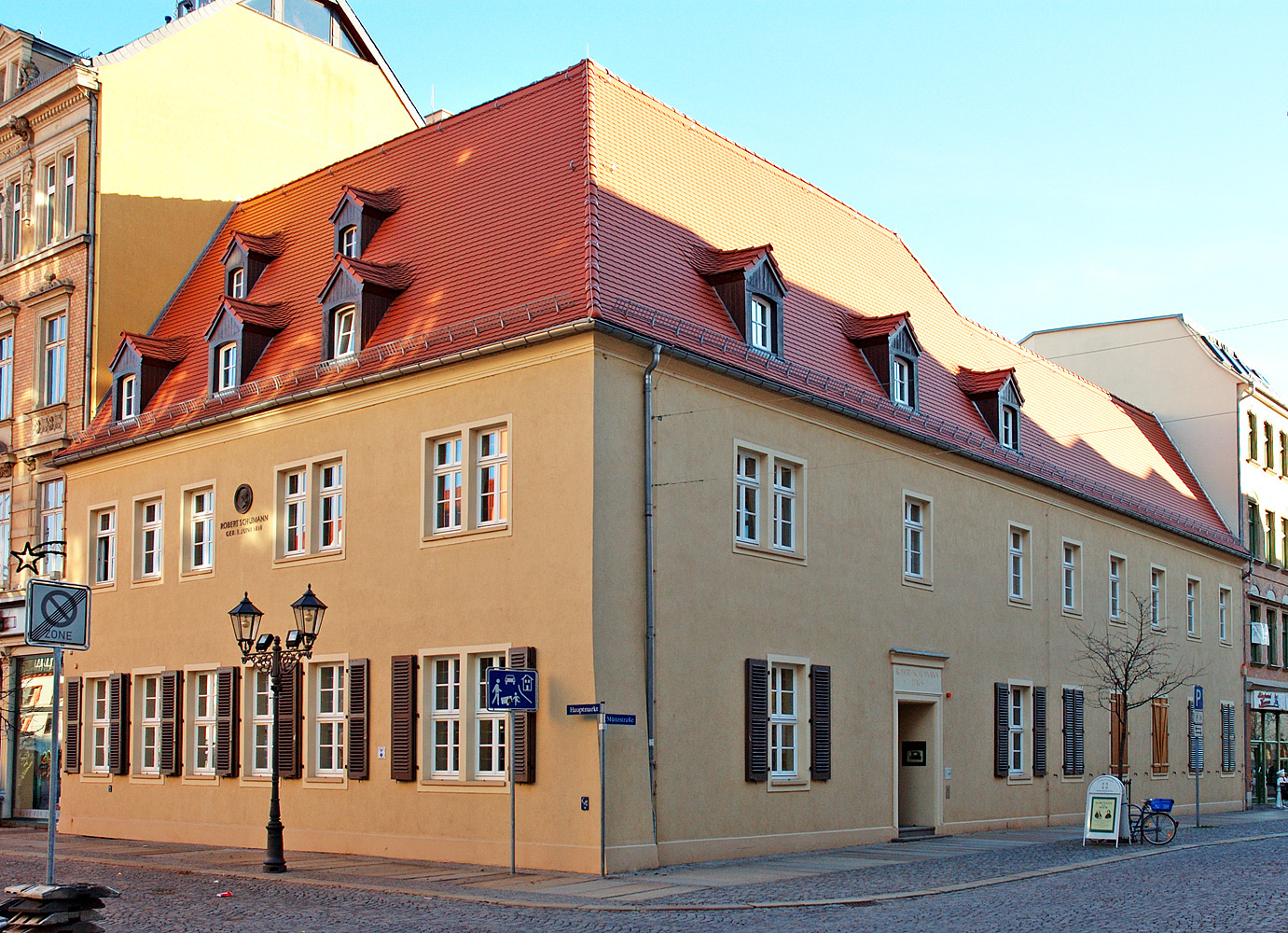
House where Robert Schumann was born 1810, museum at Hauptmarkt 5

In the city centre there are three museums: an art museum from the 19th century and the houses of priests from 13th century, both located next to St. Mary's church. Just around the corner there is the Robert-Schumann museum. The museums offer different collections dedicated to the history of the city, as well as art and a mineralogical, palaeontological and geological collection with many specimens from the city and the nearby Ore Mountains.

Zwickau is the birthplace of the composer Robert Schumann. The house where he was born in 1810 still stands in the marketplace. This is now called Robert Schumann House and is a museum dedicated to him.

The histories of the Audi and Horch automobile factories are presented at the August Horch Museum Zwickau. The museum is an Anchor Point of the European Route of Industrial Heritage (EIRH).

== Notable people ==
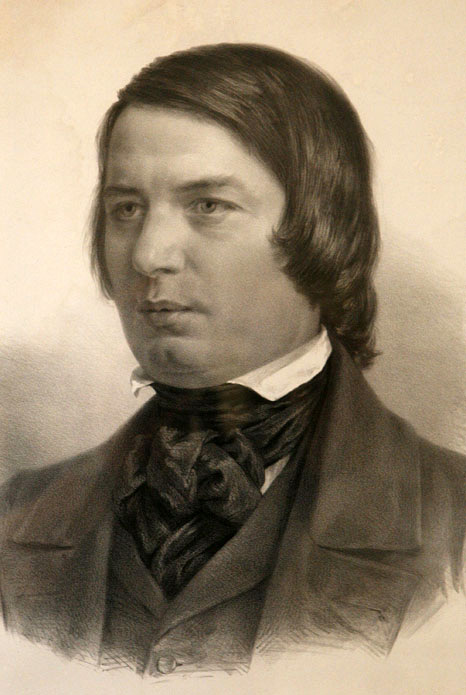
Robert Schumann

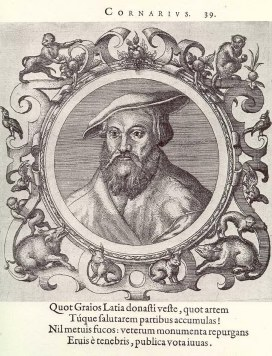
Janus Cornarius

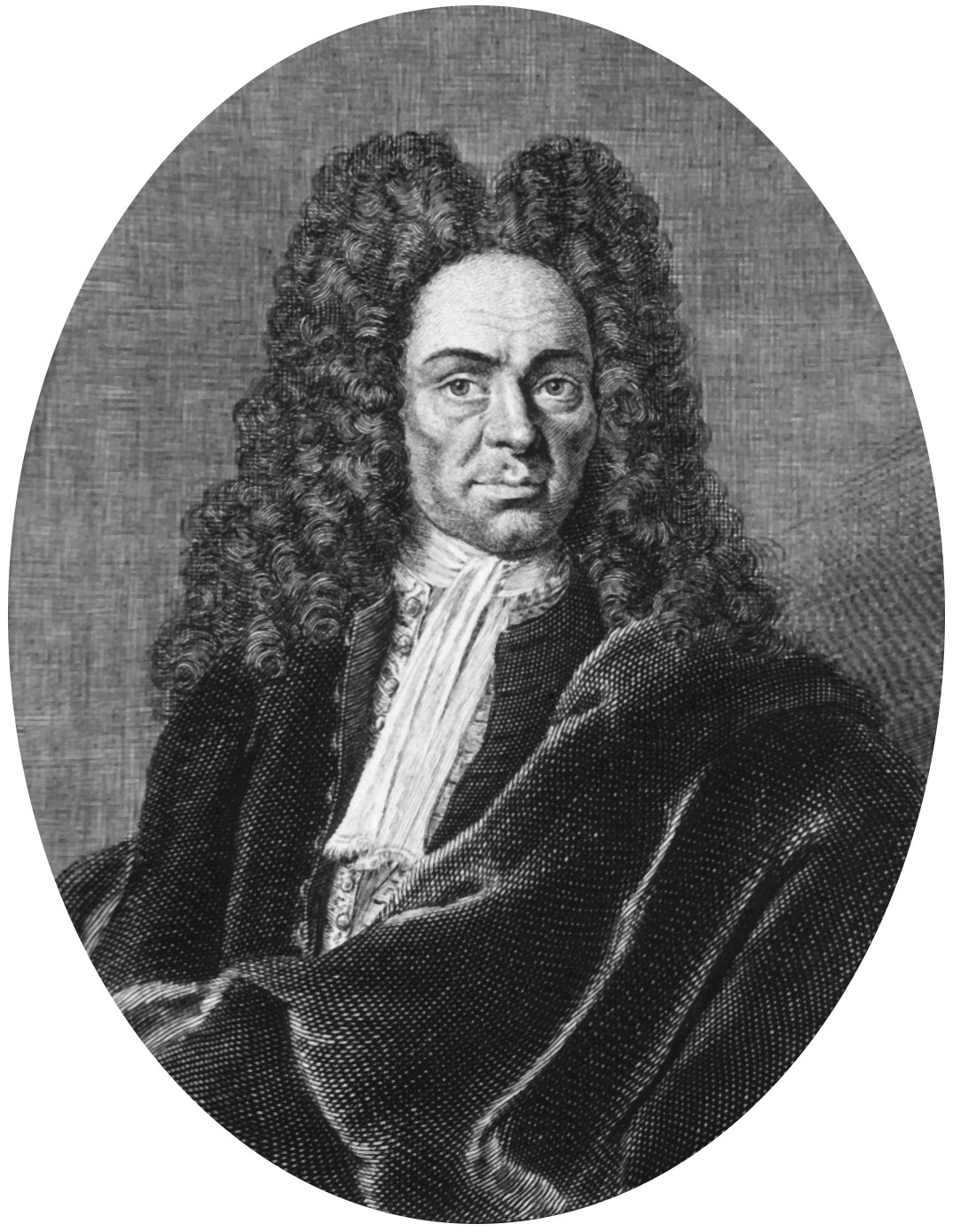
Jacob Leupold

=== Born before 1900 ===
- Nicholas Storch (before 1500 – after 1536), weaver and lay preacher (Zwickau Prophets)
- Janus Cornarius (c. 1500–1558), philologist and physician
- Gregor Haloander (1501–1531), jurist
- David Köler (1532–1565), musician, organist, choirmaster and composer
- Jacob Leupold (1674–1727), mechanic and instrument maker
- Robert Schumann (1810–1856), composer of the Romantic era
- Paul Emil Flechsig (1847–1929) neuroanatomist, psychiatrist and neuropathologist
- Heinrich Schurtz (1863–1903), ethnologist and historian
- August Horch (1868–1952), automotive engineer
- Heinrich Waentig (1870–1943), economist and politician (SPD)
- Hans Dominik (1872–1945), writer, journalist and engineer
- Fritz Bleyl (1880–1966), Expressionist painter and architect
- Max Pechstein (1881–1955), Expressionist painter
- "Margaret Scott" (1888–1973), militant suffragette in London
- Paul Langheinrich (1895–1979), genealogist

=== Born after 1900 ===
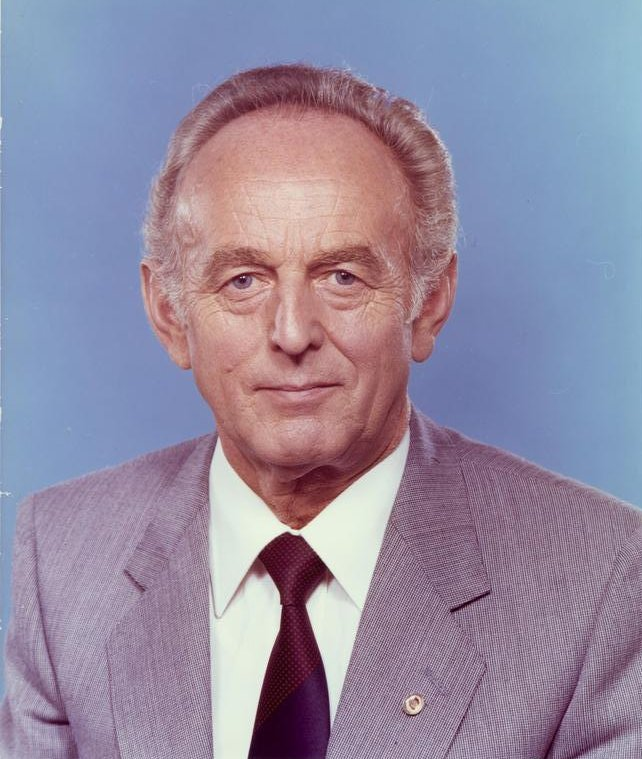
Gerhard Schürer in 1982

- Gerhard Küntscher (1900–1972), orthopedic surgeon and inventor of the modern intramedullary nailing procedure to treat long bone fractures
- Robert Eberan von Eberhorst (1902–1982), Austrian automotive engineer
- Gershom Schocken (1912–1990), Israeli journalist and politician
- Gert Fröbe (1913–1988), actor
- Gerhard Schürer (1921–2010), politician (SED)
- Erhard Weller (1926–1986), actor
- Rolf Hädrich (1931–2000), film director and screenwriter
- Dieter F. Uchtdorf (born 1940), Second Counselor in the Church of Jesus Christ of Latter-day Saints. He lived here following World War II.
- Gerhard Körner (1941–2025), football player and manager
- Harald Fritzsch (1943–2022), theoretical physicist (quantum theory)
- Volkmar Weiss (born 1944), geneticists, social historian and genealogist
- Jürgen Croy (born 1946), footballer
- Peter Sattmann (1947–2025), actor, playwright and musician
- Christoph Bergner (born 1948), politician (CDU), 1993–1994 Prime Minister of Saxony-Anhalt
- Eckart Viehweg (1948–2010), mathematician
- Hagen von Ortloff (born 1949), TV-journalist
- Werner Schulz (1950–2022), politician (Alliance 90/The Greens)
- Gotthold Schwarz (born 1950), bass-baritone and conductor, 34th Thomaskantor 2016-2021
- Frank Petzold (born 1951), composer and conductor
- Christoph Daum (1953–2024), football player and coach
- Lutz Dombrowski (born 1959), athlete and Olympic champion
- Lars Riedel (born 1967), discus thrower
- Sven Günther (born 1974), footballer
- Cathleen Martini (born 1982), bobsledder, world champion
- Henrike Naumann (1984–2026), installation artist
- Marie-Elisabeth Hecker (born 1987), classical cellist
- Danny Röhl (born 1989), football coach
- Kristin Gierisch (born 1990), triple jumper

== Twin towns – sister cities ==
Zwickau is twinned with:

- Jablonec nad Nisou, Czech Republic (1971)
- Zaanstad, Netherlands (1987)
- Dortmund, Germany (1988)
- Volodymyr, Ukraine (2014)
- Yandu (Yancheng), China (2014)

== See also ==
- SV Cainsdorf
