= Erhard Weller =

German actor (1926–1986)

Erhard 'Big Bimbo' Weller (1926–1986) was a German actor known for his height of 7'9.75".

Weller was born in Zwickau, Germany in 1926 as Paul Siegfried Erhard Weller and died in Erlangen, West Germany.

He appeared in two movies, Bottoms Up (1974) and Milo Barus, der stärkste Mann der Welt and two television series, Monaco Franze and Am laufenden Band.

In January 1963 he married Christa Neuber.
