= Mosel (Zwickau) =

- Ortsteil of Zwickau
- Interactive map of Mosel
- Location within Germany Location within Saxony
- Coordinates: 50°46′55″N 12°28′30″E
- Country: Germany
- State: Saxony
- District: Zwickau
- Town: Zwickau

Area
  - Total: 6.88 km^{2} (2.66 sq mi)
- Elevation: 264 m (866 ft)

Population (2011)
  - Total: 2,140
  - Density: 311/km^{2} (806/sq mi)
- Time zone: UTC+01:00 (CET)
  - Summer (DST): UTC+02:00 (CEST)
- Postal codes: 08001–08067
- Website: www.zwickau.de

Mosel (German pronunciation: [ˈmoːzl̩]) is a village (Ortsteil) and a former municipality in the Zwickau district in Saxony, Germany. It was incorporated into the municipality of Zwickau in 1999. Mosel is an economically significant Ortsteil in the Stadtbezirk Zwickau-Nord with the official number 36.
