= Paul Langheinrich =

Paul Langheinrich (1895–1979) was a German genealogist who saved a large number of German records that might have otherwise been destroyed from 1945 to 1953. His records were the base of the German Records Collection of the Family History Library as well as the main initial component of the Deutsche Zentralstelle fur Genealogie.

Many of the records Langheinrich gathered were hid in mines and other out of the way places in East Germany. He microfilmed many records that he was not able to move, and most of those were destroyed.

Langheinrich was born in Oberplanitz in the state of Saxony then part of the German Empire. He was a Latter-day Saint. He had joined The Church of Jesus Christ of Latter-day Saints (LDS Church) on November 28, 1919. Because of his membership in the church he became interested in genealogy. He was heavily involved in collecting genealogical records between the end of World War II and the end of 1953 when he emigrated to Salt Lake City, Utah. When he began his efforts to gather up and preserve the records, he was serving as a counselor in the presidency of the LDS Church's East German Mission.

== Sources ==
- Raymond S. Wright. "Langheinrich, Paul". in Arnold K. Garr, et al., ed. The Encyclopedia of Latter-day Saint History (Salt Lake City: Deseret Book, 2000) p. 640.
- Kahlile Mehr, "The Langheinrich Legacy: Record-Gathering in Post-War Germany", Ensign, June 1981, p. 23
- Allen, James B., Jessie L. Embry and Kahlile B. Mehr. Hearts Turned to the Fathers. Provo: BYU Studies, 1995.
- Langheinrich, Armin Paul, Langheinrich, Frank-Armin. "Langheinrich Family and Genealogical Records (not published)".
- article on East German records
- Aguste Vachon, Claire Boudreau and Daniel Cogne. Genealogica And Heraldica (Ottawa: University of Ottawa Press, 1998) p. 94.
