= Kammweg =

Long-distance path in Germany and Czechia

The Kammweg ("Ridgeway") was a long-distance path opened in 1904 along the crest of the Elster Mountains, Ore Mountains, Bohemian Switzerland, Lusatian Mountains, Ještěd Mountains, Jizera and Giant Mountains, Śnieżnik Mountains and High Ash Mountains. This path was once the longest tourist trail in the German-speaking region of Europe. Since 2011 the ridgeway tradition has been continued with the Ore Mountains-Vogtland Ridgeway (Kammweg Erzgebirge–Vogtland), which runs on the German side of the border.

== History ==
The planned route was to run along all the mountains along the German border with Bohemia and Moravian Silesia from the Danube to the Oder. At its longest, the path ran all the way from the Háj u Aše (German: Hainberg) near Aš (Asch) to the Praděd (Altvater) in the High Ash Mountains.

After 1945, when the German-speaking population both north and south of the Silesian-Bohemian border was expelled, the continuous signing of the route was abandoned, most parts of the trail were, however, preserved as hiking trails. After 1990, the E3 European long distance path was newly signed, largely following the historical route.

The Ridgeway in the Giant Mountains

From the west looking towards the Schneekoppe

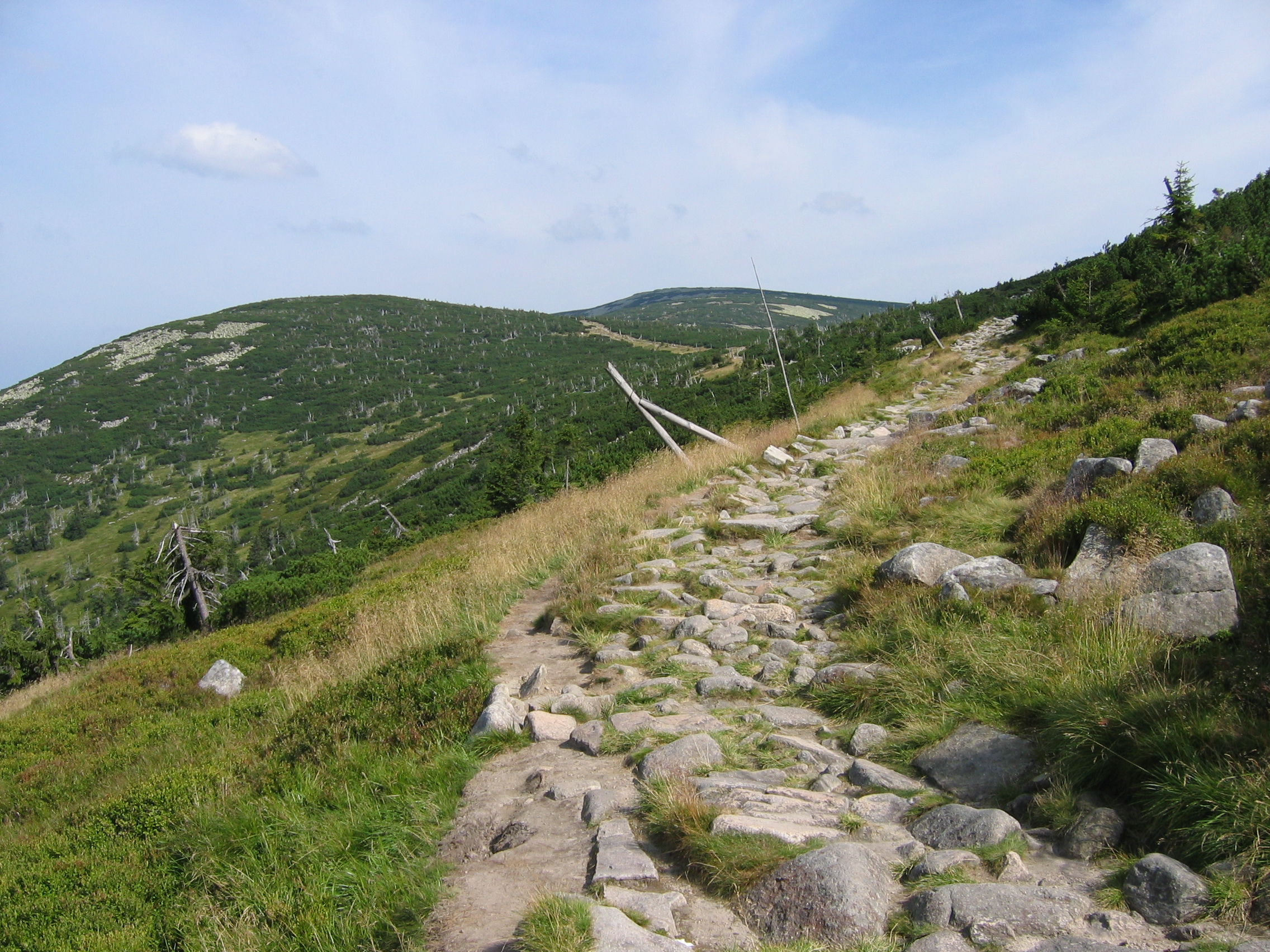
Typically rocky section of trail

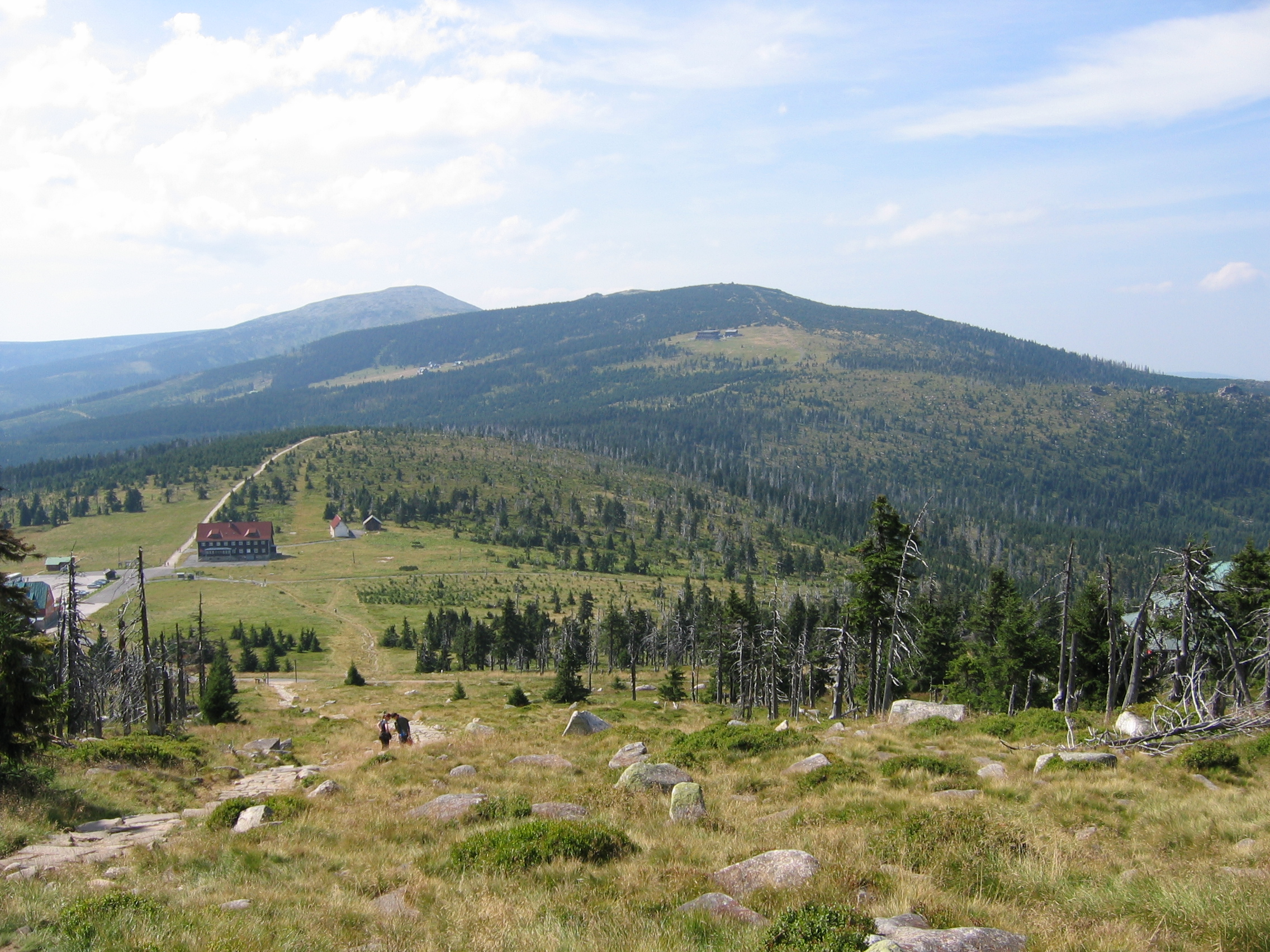
Looking from the Spindlerova Bouda to the Vysoké Kolo

== Ore Mountains-Vogtland Ridgeway ==
On 13 May 2011, the Ore Mountains-Vogtland Ridgeway (Kammweg Erzgebirge–Vogtland) was opened. This runs entirely on the German side of the border. It begins in Geising in the Eastern Ore Mountains and ends after 289 kilometres in Blankenstein in Thuringia, where it connects to the Rennsteig and Frankenweg. The main sponsor of the Ore Mountains – Vogtland Ridgeway are the Ore Mountain Tourist Association and Vogtland Tourist Association. The community project was achieved with assistance from the communes and counties on the ridgeway, the Saxony Forestry Commission, the Ore Mountain–Vogtland Nature Park and the hiking clubs in the Vogtland, Ore Mountains and Franconian Forest. The ridgeway is certified as a "quality route".

Course: Geising – Altenberg – Rehefeld – above Holzhau – Rechenberg-Bienenmühle – Clausnitz – Friedebach – Neuhausen – Seiffen – oberhalb Olbernhau – Rübenau – Kühnhaide – Reitzenhain – Satzung – Schmalzgrube – Jöhstadt-Schlössel – Königswalde – Bärenstein – Neudorf/Kretscham-Rothensehma – Fichtelberg (1214.7 m) – Oberwiesenthal – Tellerhäuser – Rittersgrün – Johanngeorgenstadt – Auersberg (1019 m) – Wildenthal – Weitersglashütte – Carlsfeld – Mühlleithen – Muldenberg – Schöneck – Hermsgrün – Leubetha – above Eichigt – Bobenneukirchen – Burgstein/Krebes – Gutenfürst – Gebersreuth – Hirschberg – Pottiga – Blankenberg – Blankenstein.

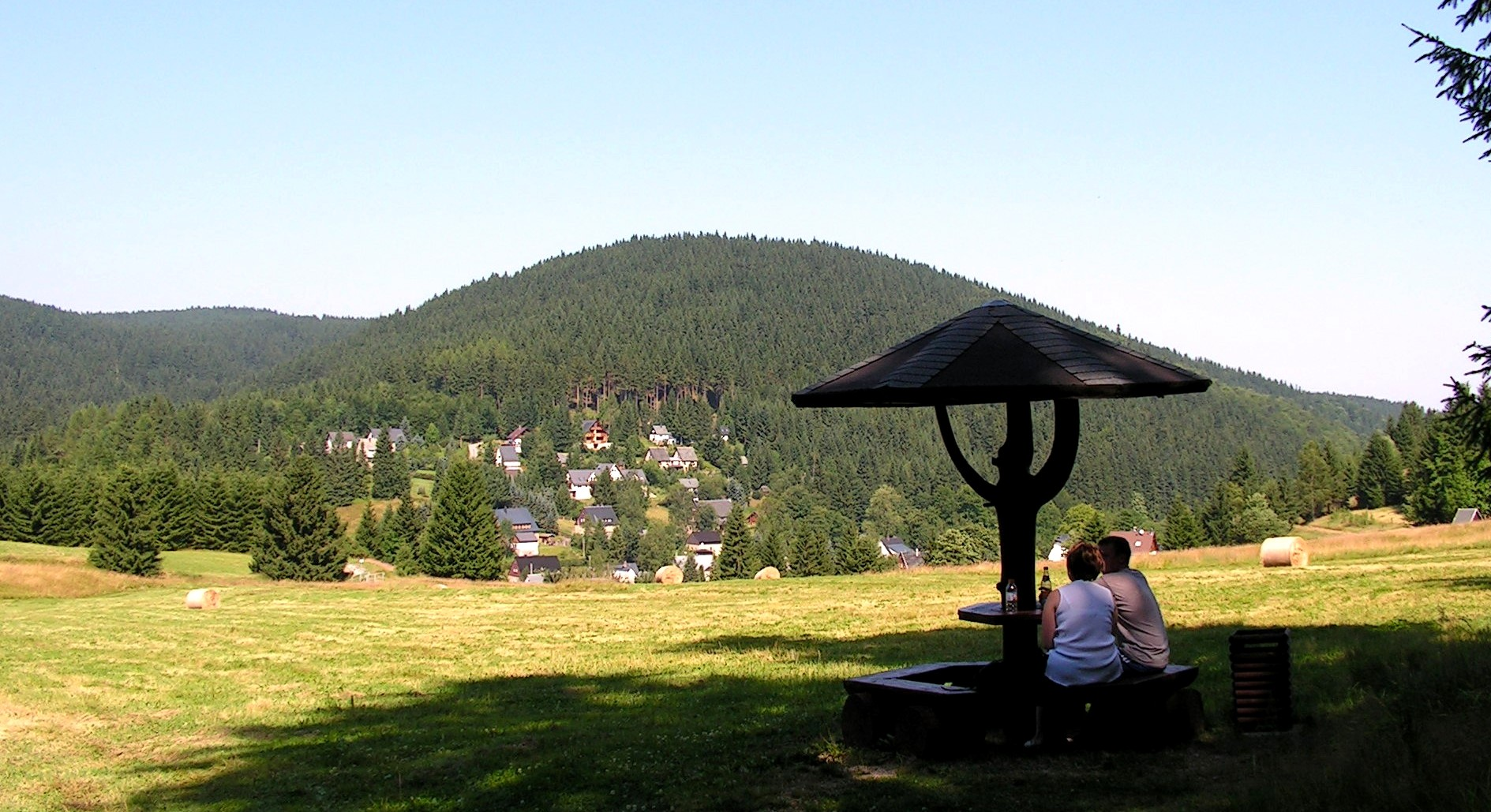
Rest area in Wildenthal

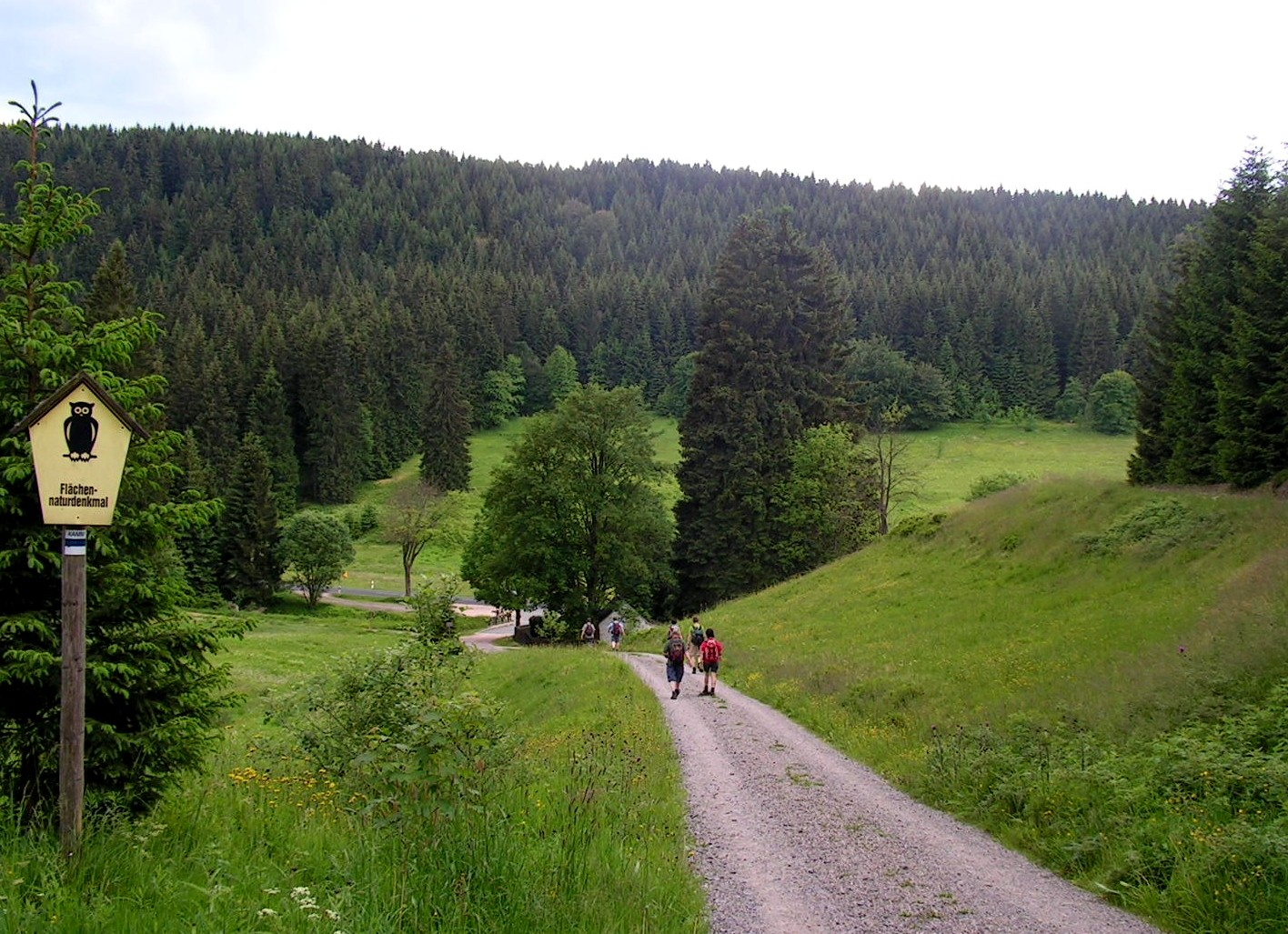
Descent from the Auersberg

The Kammweg is divided into the following 17 stages:

Stage	Stage end point	Stage- length (km)	Total length (km)
-	Geising, station.	—	0.0
1	Holzhau, car park by the Fischerbaude	24.5	24.5
2	Sayda, Alte Kreuztanne	12.5	37.0
3	Seiffen, church	10.0	47.0
4	Olbernhau, P Saigerhütte	11.5	58.5
5	Kühnhaide, P Schwarzwassertal	21.0	79.5
6	Satzung, Hirtstein	14.0	93.5
7	Bärenstein, P Bergauffahrt	22.5	116.0
8	Fichtelberg, Kurort Oberwiesenthal	18.0	134.0
9	Breitenbrunn, Himmelswiese	18.0	152.0
10	Johanngeorgenstadt, Steinbach	14.5	166.5
11	Weitersglashütte	11.0	177.5
12	Mühlleithen, top of B 283 pass	14.0	191.5
13	Schöneck, IFA holiday park	15.0	206.5
14	Eichigt, Obereichigt bus stop	25.0	231.5
15	Burgsteingebiet, Krebes, P an den Burgsteinruinen	21.0	252.5
16	Mödlareuth, Zum Grenzgänger inn	14.5	267.0
17	Blankenstein, Selbitzplatz	22.0	289.0

== Signing ==

The old ridgeway was marked locally with a "comb" sign (Kammweg = "crest way" or "ridgeway", but Kamm also means "comb")

Signposts for the Ore Mountains - Vogtland Ridgeway.

== Literature ==
- Einsteigen und Abschalten. Übersichtskarte Kammweg Erzgebirge – Vogtland. Tourismusverband Erzgebirge e. V. 2011
