= Neugrabenflöße =

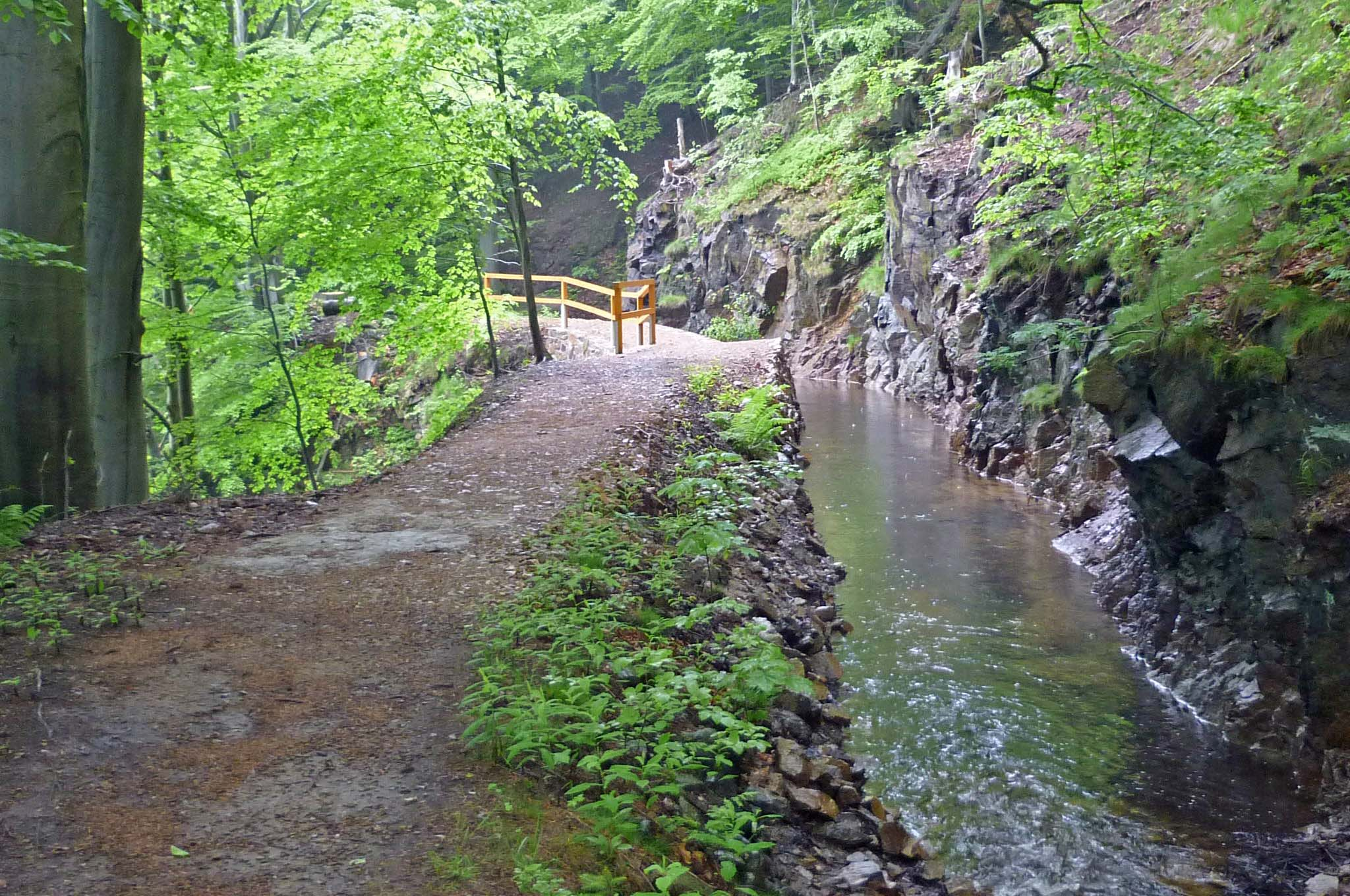

Location
- Location: Germany, Czech Republic

Physical characteristics
- Source
  - location: Source: near Fleyh (Fláje)
  - coordinates: 50°41′28″N 13°34′56″E
- Mouth
  - location: near Clausnitz into the Rachel
  - coordinates: 50°44′11″N 13°29′43″E
- Length: 18 km

Basin features
- Progression: Flöha → Freiberger Mulde
- River system: Freiberger Mulde

The Neugrabenflöße (also called the Floßgraben), was a roughly 18 km long Kunstgraben dating to the 17th century. It enabled the rafting of timber for the mining and smelting industries in the Ore Mountains of eastern Germany. It ran from the River Flöha near Fleyh (Fláje) to the Freiberger Mulde near Clausnitz in the Ore Mountains.

== Course ==
Starting at Fleyh this artificial water channel ran for about 3.5 km in a northwesterly direction to the eastern end of Bohemian Georgenthal (today Český Jiřetín). Here it changed direction by almost 180° and ran for about 3 km eastwards into the Rauschenbach valley. After crossing the Rauschenbach stream and the Bohemian-German border it continued towards the west. North of Cämmerswalde it crossed the watershed between Flöha and the Freiberger Mulde rivers. From there on the ditch ran in a northerly direction through Clausnitz and discharged finally after about 18 km at the southeastern end of Clausnitz into the River Rachel.

Shortly behind Fláje the ditch crosses a steep hillside and the channel is hewn out of the rock. The channel also crosses several streams en route to Clausnitz, for example, it crosses the Rauschenbach after about 6.5 km and the Czech–German border that runs along it here.

== History ==
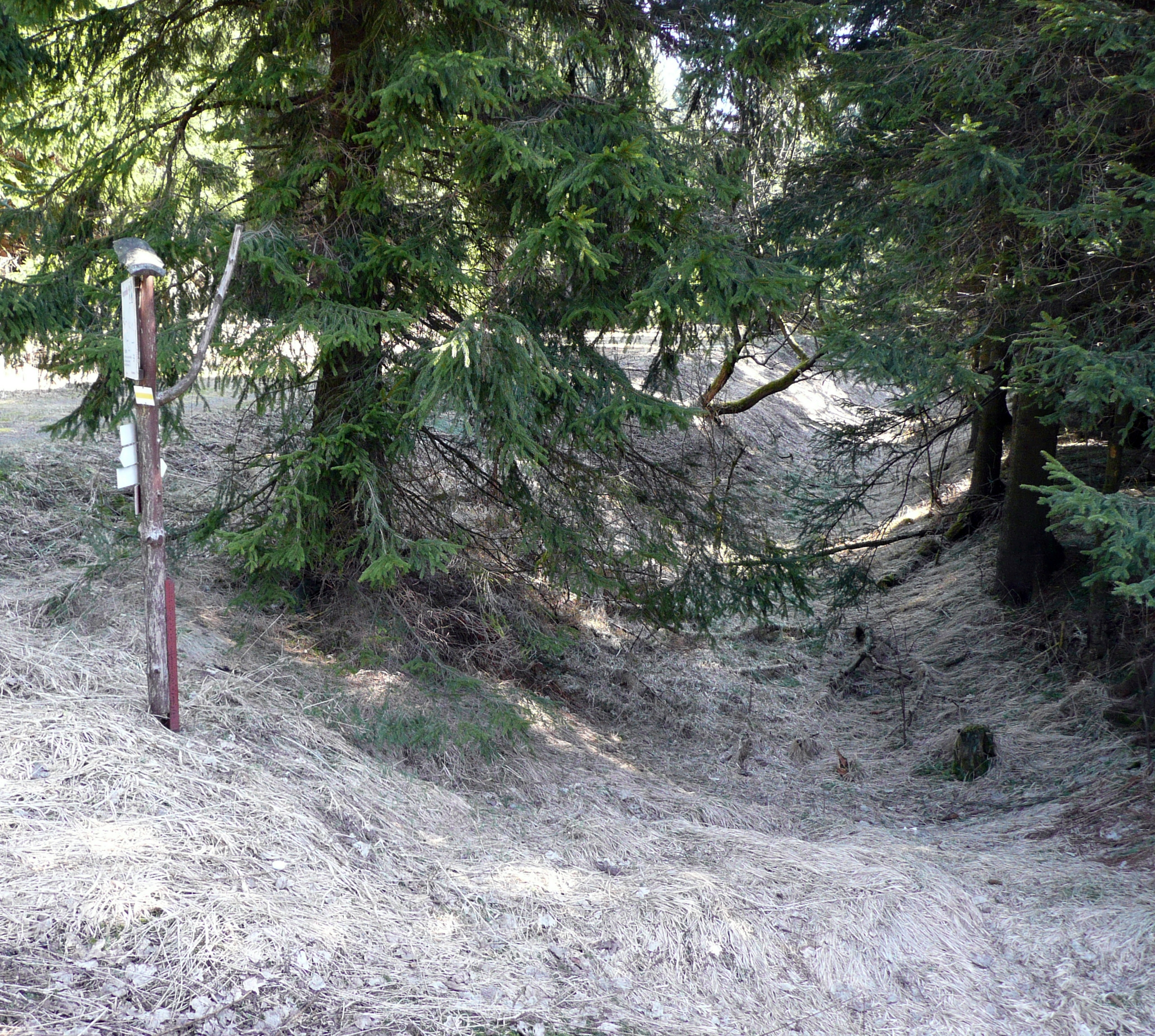
The Neugrabenflöße between Deutschgeorgenthal and Cämmerswalde

The channel was dug in the years 1624–1629 at the instigation of the lords of Lobkowicz in Bohemia and Schönberg in Saxony. It was commissioned by the Saxon prince-elector, John George I. By 1569 the Saxon chief mining engineer (Oberbergmeister), Martin Planer, had produced the first plans for a rafting channel from the source region of the River Flöha to the Freiberger Mulde, which had to cross the watershed of both river catchment areas. But the Neugrabenflöße was not built until the 17th century to new plans by chief smelting officer (Oberhüttenverwalter), Friedrich Lingke.

The rafting channel was used for almost 250 years to transport logs from Fleyh in the Freiberg mining region. With the construction of the railway link from Freiberg to Rechenberg-Bienenmühle, timber rafting on the channel ceased.

== Closure of the mines and present state ==
Following the closure of the mines the channel continued to be used until the 1940s to supply water for the Georgendorf Paper Factory. After the factory shut the Neugrabenflöße was forgotten. Today many parts of the channel are filled or levelled.

== Literature ==
- Zdeněk Bárta: Plavební kanál Fláje-Clausnitz v Krušných horách / Der Floßgraben Fláje - Clausnitz im Erzgebirge. Verlag Krušnohorská iniciativa, Mariánské Radčice, 1999, (Texts in German and Czech)
- Vít Joza (übersetzt von Norbert Krutský): Plavební kanál Fláje-Clausnitz v Krusných horách. strucný pruvodce historií a soucasností významé technické památky (Der Floßgraben Fleyh-Clausnitz im Erzgebirge). Verlag Krusnohorská Iniciativa, Mariánské Radcice, 2002, ISBN 80-238-8518-9 (Texts in German and Czech)
- G. Müller: Zur Forst- und Wirtschafts-Geschichte des Forstbezirkes Marienberg im Erzgebirge., Tharandter Forstliche Jahrbücher, Vol. 86; 1935
- J. Siegel: Veränderung des Waldbildes im östlichen Erzgebirge im Wandel der geschichtlichen Jahrhunderte., Tharandter Forstliche Jahrbücher Vol. 78; 1927
- H. Wilsdorf, W. Herrmann, W., K. Löffler: Bergbau - Wald - Flöße., Freiberger Forschungshefte, Berlin, 1960
- J. Winkler: Die Neugrabenflöße zwischen Flöha und der Freiberger Mulde., Mitteilungen des Landesvereines Sächsischer Heimatschutz, Vol. 24, Ed. 1/4; 1935
- Von Flöß- und andern Wassergraben. In: Historischer Schauplatz derer natürlichen Merkwürdigkeiten in dem Meißnischen Ober-Ertzgebirge. Leipzig, 1699, p. 196 (digitalised)
