= Glassworks Museum of the Ore Mountains =

Museum in Germany

Coordinates: 50°40′39″N 13°27′44″E

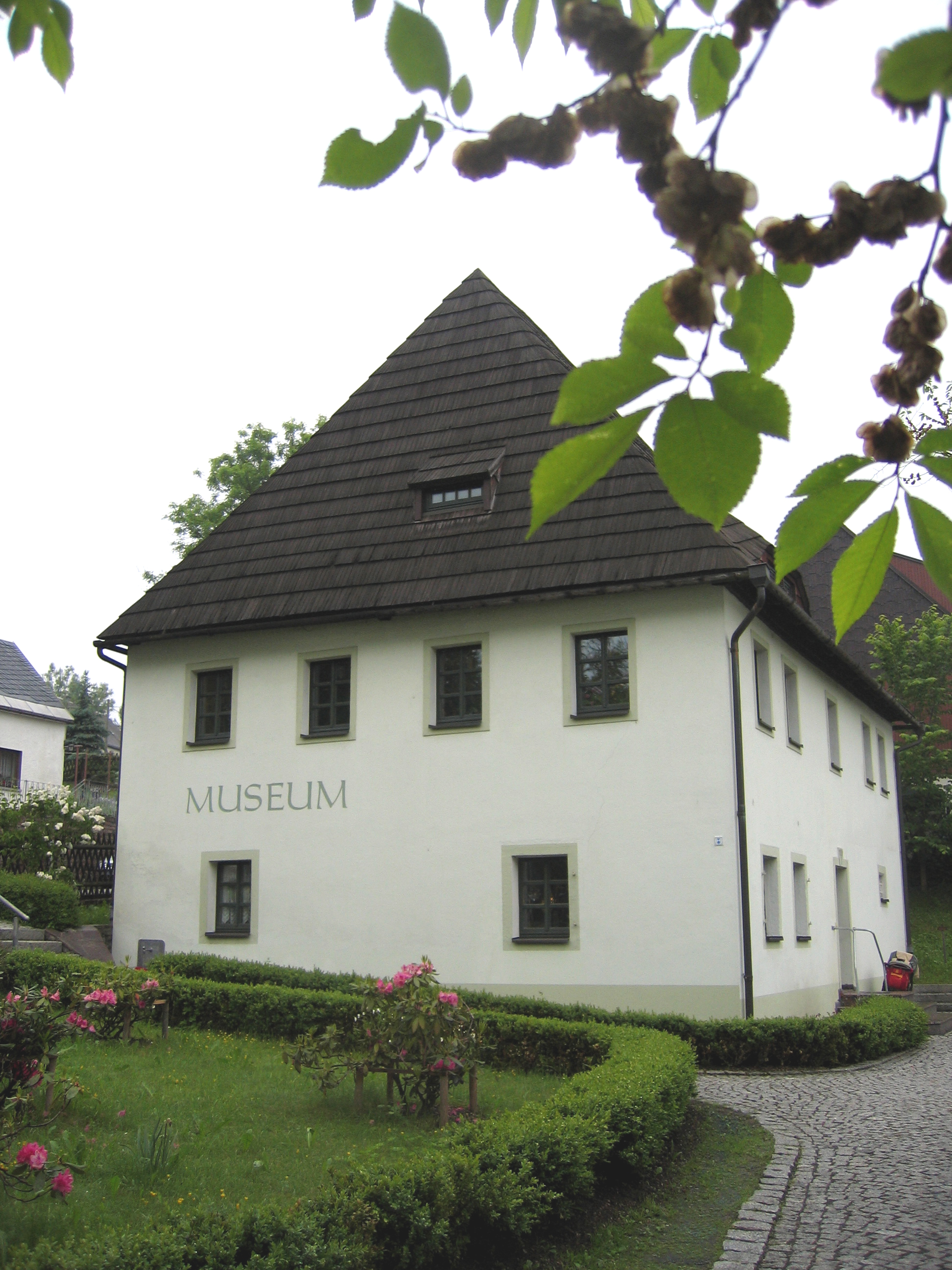
Ore Mountain Glassworks Museum (June 2009)

Glassworks Museum of the Ore Mountains, Neuhausen, Saxony

The Glassworks Museum of the Ore Mountains (German: Glashüttenmuseum des Erzgebirges) is located in the old socage vault (Fronfeste) of Purschenstein Castle in Neuhausen/Erzgeb. in the German Free State of Saxony.

The museum displays include a glassworks from the time of Georgius Agricola, as well as a workshop (Werkstattstube) and other writing implements and tools of Ore Mountain glassmakers as well as the history of Neuhausen and Purschenstein Castle. In addition there are demonstrations of glass blowing.

== Museum ==
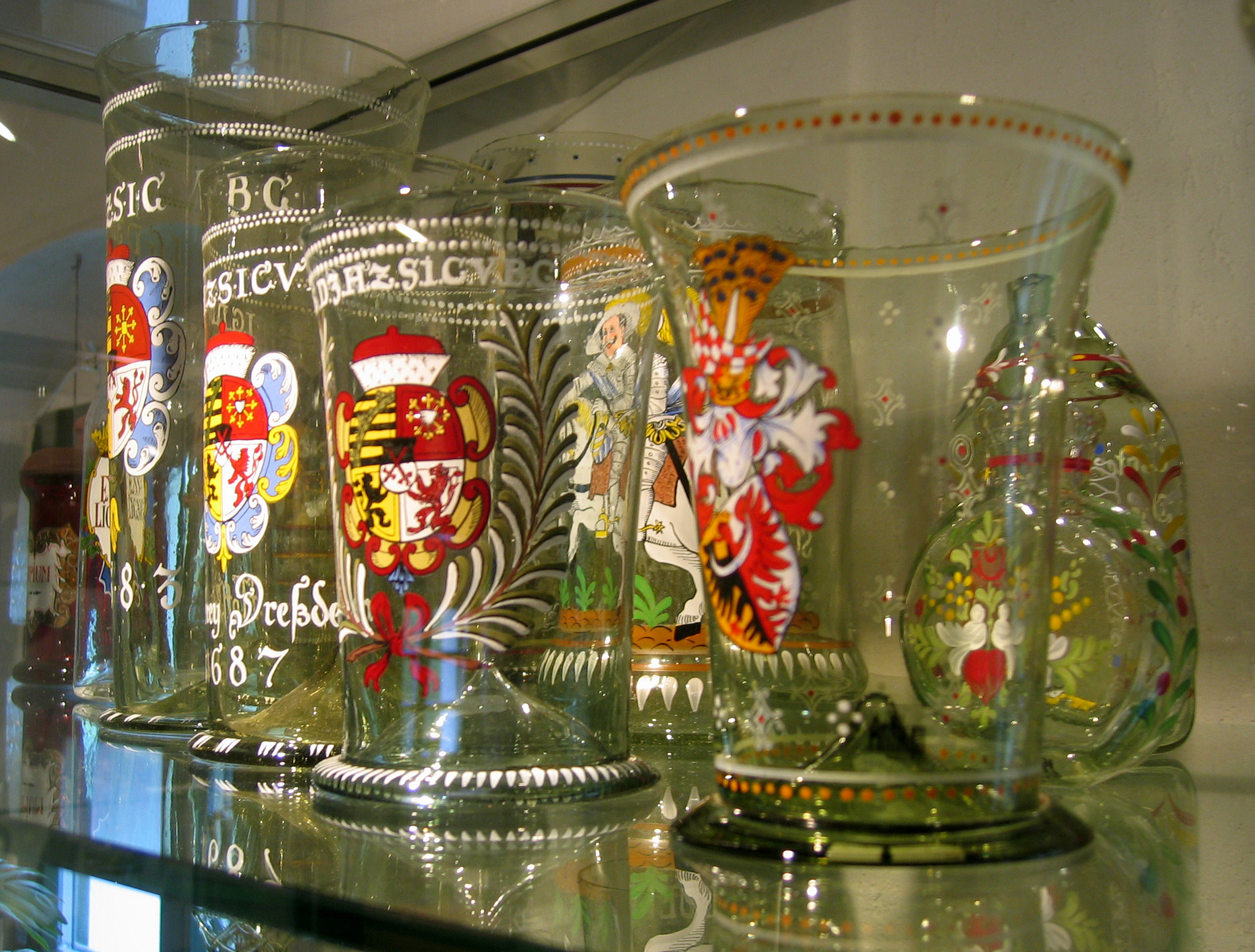
Historic glasses from the Ore Mountains

The glassworks museum in Neuhausen preserves evidence of the work of glassmakers in the Ore Mountains, an industry that goes back to the original settlement of the area around 1200 and includes work from both the Saxon and Bohemian regions of the Ore Mountains.

The significance of these glassworks had an impact far beyond the Ore Mountain region. This is also true of the old Neuhausen glassworks of Heidelbach, founded in 1488, which worked until about 1827 and is represented in the exhibition.

In the Heidelbach glassworks, in addition to simple everyday glasses and plate glass and high-quality glass work was also carried out. For example, the glass factory belonged to the purveyors of glas to the Saxon electors and other noble houses. "The Four Evangelists", four round panes of glasse painted with enamel, made for Purschenstein's castle chapel and dating to the year 1612, may be seen in the exhibition.

The Glassworks Museum portrays an almost extinct, traditional craft. The exhibition shows the diversity of the glass as a material and the possibilities in terms of colour, shape and finish. On display are historic everyday glasses as well as special glass pieces, such as the round glass panes of 1612 and an Ore Mountain chandelier (Leuchterspinnen), over a hundred years old.

== History ==
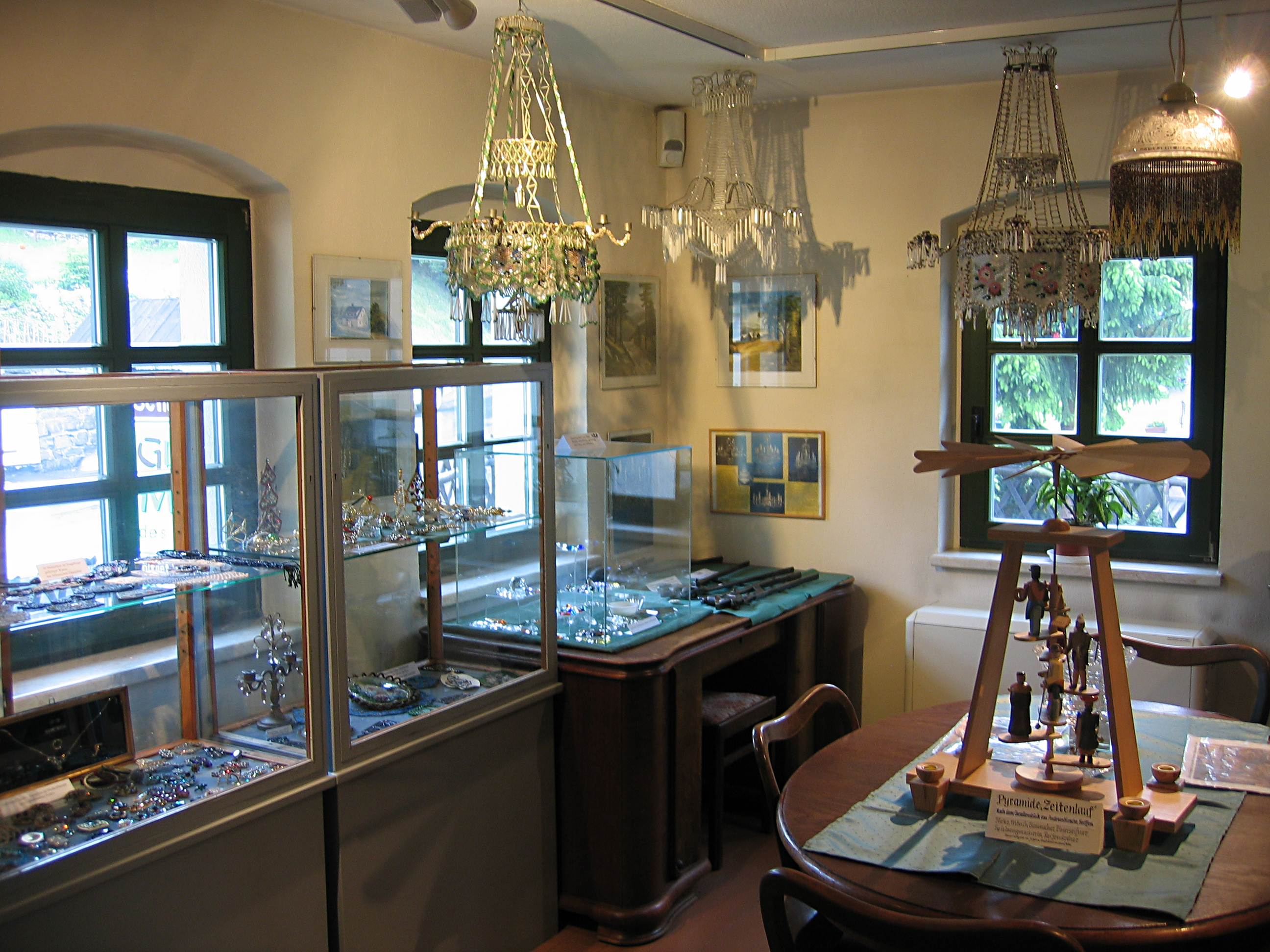
One of the exhibition rooms

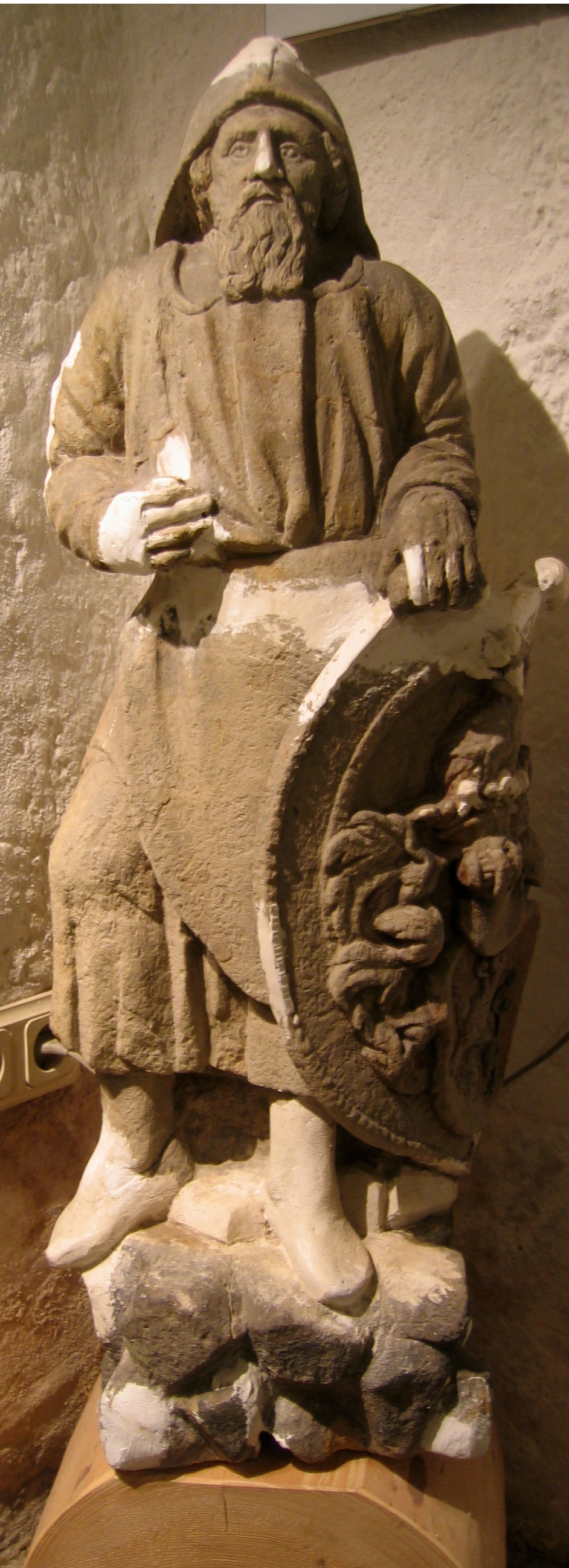
An excavated glass figure, believed to have been lost, at Purschenstein Castle

In the early 1990s the socage vault, built in 1750, of Purschenstein Castle was placed under protection. Through grants the house, which is owned by the parish, was refurbished and, with the help of the local branch of the Ore Mountain Club, turned into a museum. In May 1996 the Ore Mountain Glassworks Museum (Erzgebirgische Glashüttenmuseum) opened its first exhibition. It contained pieces from the roughly 800-year-old glassmaking industry in the Ore Mountains.

The exhibition focusses particularly on the history of the Heidelbach Glassworks from 1488 to 1827. Since opening, the museum has also been enhanced by the replica of a glass melting furnace in an adjoining building, which should enable the production of clear glass jars to be demonstrated to the public.

In May 2006, the museum celebrated its anniversary with a festive weekend. Since then, there have been glass blowing demonstrations on public holidays. Here replicas, such as fly traps, Goethe barometers or Nuppen glasses are made. Nuppen are typical glass ornaments that imitate shimmering, coloured gemstones but also serve to improve grip. Such glasses were used in the late Middle Ages amongst the upper classes. Stained glass painting and glass engraving can be seen on demonstration days at the museum.

The museum is the only one of its kind in the Ore Mountains and is sponsored by a support association in the Ore Mountain Club branch at Neuhausen. On 12 and 13 August 2002, when a hundred year flood occurred, the museum, which lies on a hill, was damaged by the overflowing waters of the adjacent castle pond, but was able to be restored thanks to a fundraising campaign and has since been reopened.

In 2010/11, with state funding, the dilapidated wooden shingle roof of the museum completely replaced. The construction work had had to be repeatedly postponed for several years because of uncertainty over the funding.

== Glassmaking ==
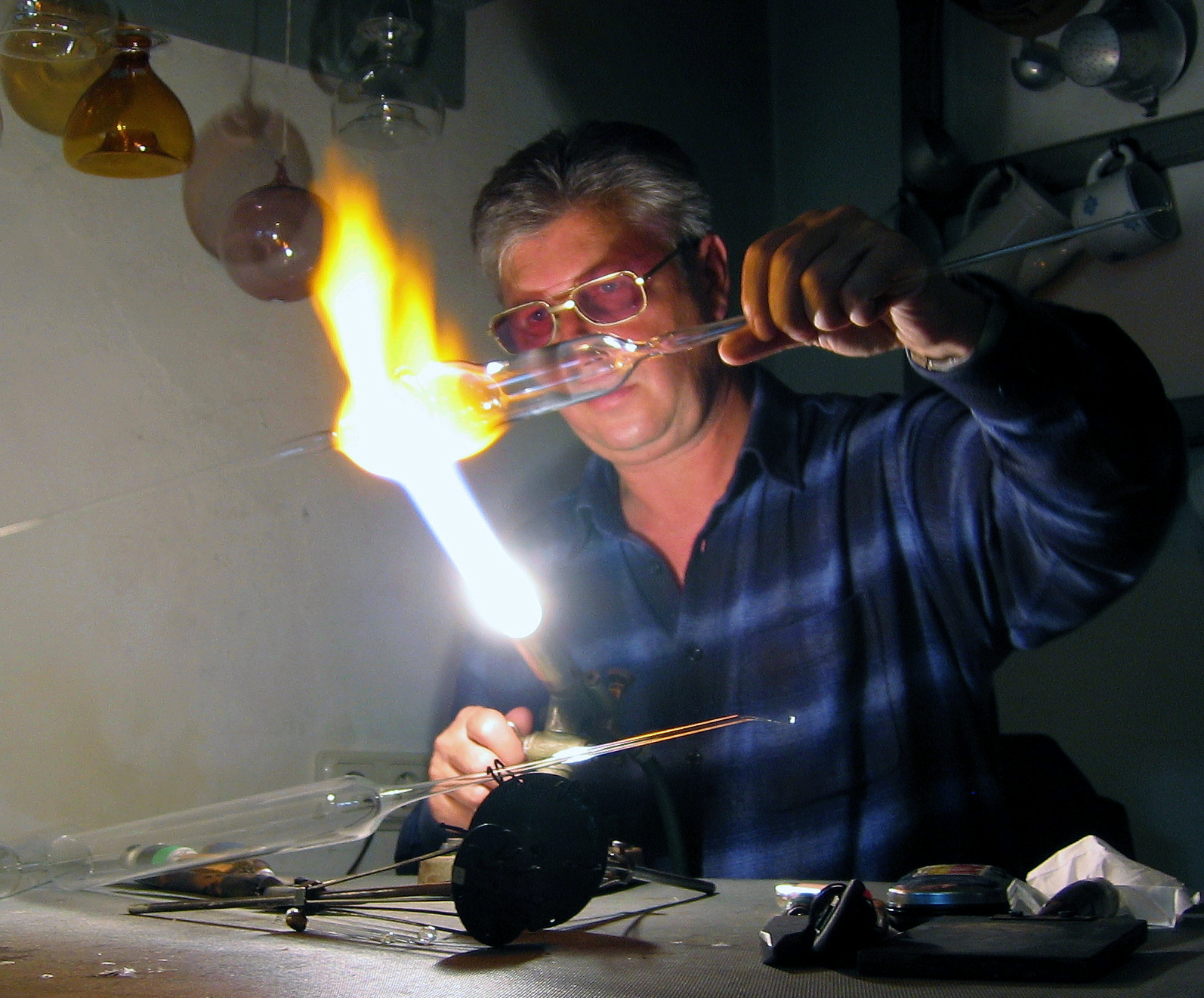
A glass blower holding a demonstration at the Glassworks Museum at Pentecost in 2009

The art of glassmaking and glass refining developed in the Ore Mountains was once a booming industry. In the Middle Ages, there were more than 50 forest glassworks in the Saxon and Bohemian Ore Mountains. This led to a wealth of regional types of glass and glass colours.

Using minerals that were already present in the raw materials, only a green-tinted glass could be produced. Decolourizing material used to be referred to as "glassmakers soap" and neutralized unwanted shades of colour. Additives of the mineral manganese dioxide or arsenic, allowed the glass to appear colourless. By using other additives, glass could be coloured, especially in cobalt-blue, purple, red, green or white.

The end of the Heidelbach Glassworks around 1827 was mainly due to its outdated smelting technology and strong competition from the Bohemian glass industry at that time. Mining, smelting and even wood carving in the "Seiffen Toy Triangle" increased the shortage of wood for fuel and took the livelihoods of glassmakers away, because they needed timber in large quantities. The industrialization of glass production began in the Ore Mountains in 1880. Major glass factories were established in the early industrial age in Carlsfeld, Zwickau and Brand-Erbisdorf. With the closure of glass furnaces in Carlsfeld in 1979 the history of glassworks in the Saxon Ore Mountains came to an end.

== Literature ==
- Um Olbernhau und Seiffen. Edition no. 1 Akademie-Verlag Berlin, Berlin 1985 (Werte unserer Heimat. Vol. 43).

Kirsche, Albrecht: Zisterzienser, Glasmacher und Drechsler - Glashütten in Erzgebirge und Vogtland und ihr Einfluss auf die Seiffener Holzkunst. Münster, New York, Munich, Berlin, 2005.
