= Georgendorf =

Georgendorf may refer to the following locations:

- Český Jiřetín, a village in the Czech Republic
- Juršinci, a village in Slovenia
