= Ridgeway (road) =

Type of ancient road that exploits the hard surface of hilltop ridges

Ridgeways are a type of ancient road that exploits the hard surface of hilltop ridges for use as unpaved, zero-maintenance roads, though they often have the disadvantage of steeper gradients along their courses, and sometimes quite narrow widths. Before the advent of turnpikes or toll roads, ridgeway trails continued to provide the firmest and safest cart tracks. They are generally an opposite to level, valley-bottom, paved roads, which require engineering work to shore up and maintain. Unmaintained valley routes may require greater travelling distances than ridgeways.

Prehistoric roads in Europe often variously comprised stretches of ridgeway above the line of springs, sections of causeway through bog and marsh, and other trackways of neither sort which crossed flat country.

A revival of interest in ancient roads and recreational walking in the 19th century brought the concept back into common use. Some ancient routes, in particular The Ridgeway National Trail of southern England, have been reprised as long-distance footpaths.

== Origin ==
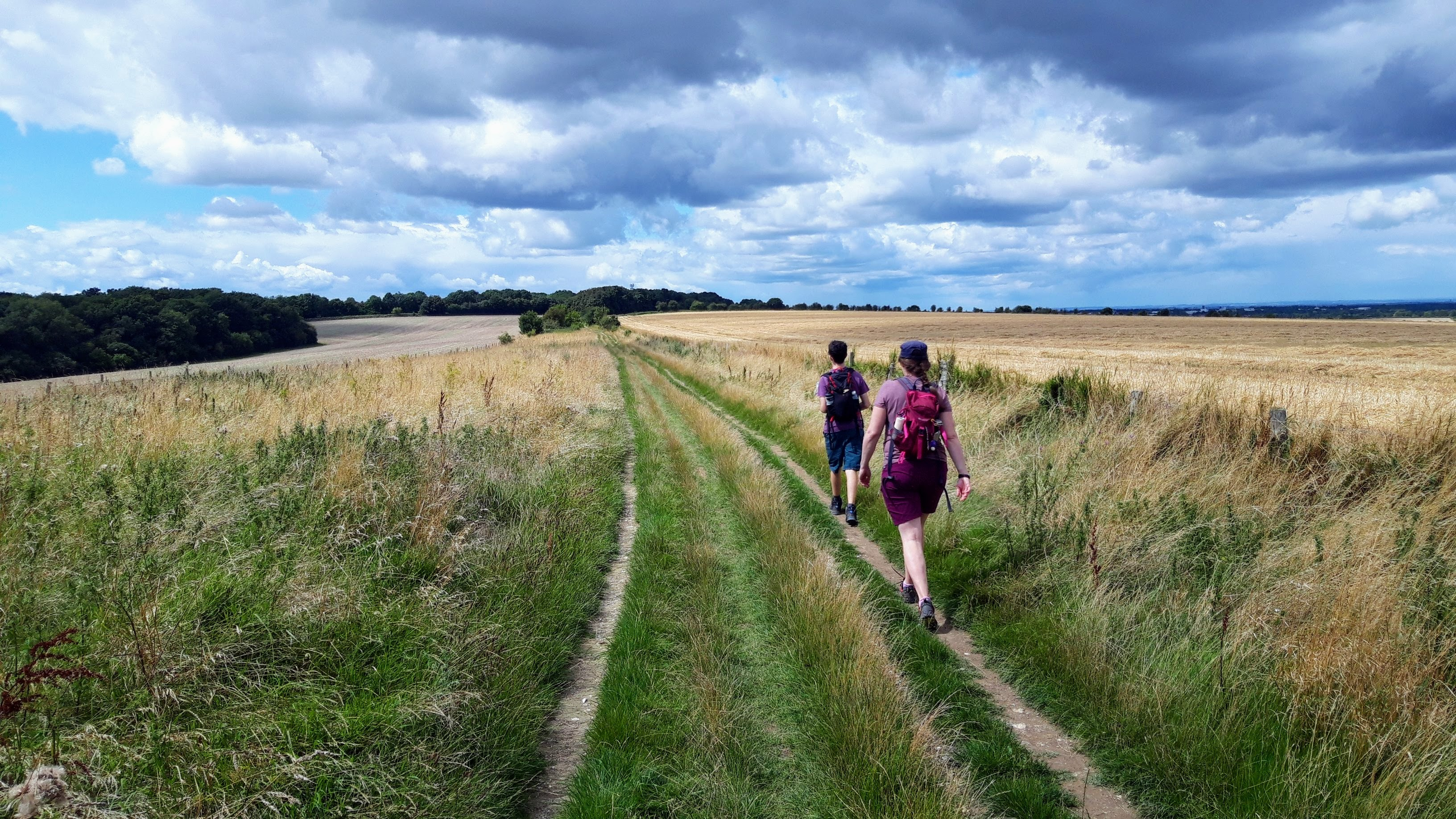
The Ridgeway on the Berkshire Downs

Along ridge lines of hills, soil is often exposed and dry because of wind and natural drainage, and vegetation tends to be thinner. Where a beaten track evolves into a busier "road", constant passage by animals, sleds and wheeled vehicles suppresses regrowth of vegetation. With the help of rain (and soil creep), a shallow trail can be worn down into the topsoil and smoothed without any purposeful road-making work. The thin soil and rocky subsoil, combined with the natural drainage provided by the slopes on each side, also tended to keep such roads dry.

In western Europe, where prehistoric roads have been extensively documented with the help of itineraries, traces on old maps and extant marks on the landscape, ridgeways are a typical feature of long-distance ancient routes through rugged, high-rainfall parts of Germany and across the island of Great Britain. These ancient trackways generally ran along the hilltops, only descending when necessary to cross valleys.

As such, they are opposite to modern-style roads, which tend to run along the valleys and only ascend when necessary to cross the hilltops.

== Courses ==
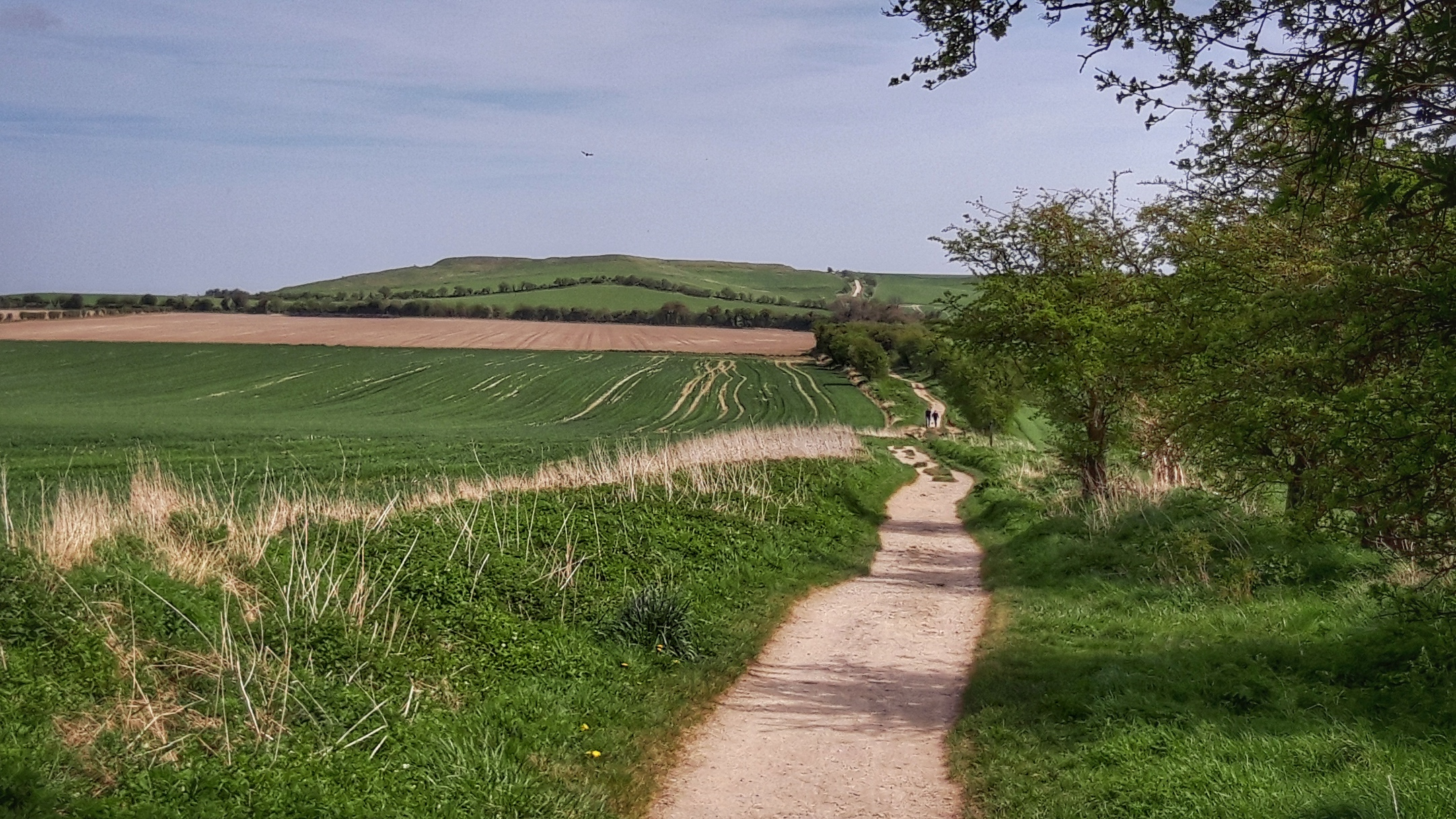
The Ridgeway approaching Whitehorse Hill

In rugged parts of central Germany, ridgeways tend to strictly follow the watershed line proper, since traversing steep slopes was difficult for wheeled vehicles and uncomfortable for foot travellers unless someone had cut a track into the hillside and shored it up against washouts and slips. However, deviations around high peaks were common, usually taking the south side of the peak, presumably because the warmer side was usually drier. On flatter British hills, the line of the tracks often runs a little below the actual crest of the ridge, possibly to afford some shelter from the wind or to avoid travellers presenting themselves to marauders as a target on the skyline.

The discomfort of following ridgeways arises from their exposure to harsh weather and the fact that they are rarely level. The ridge line rises and falls. Moreover, at some point the ridge ends, so that the route must descend to ford a stream before rising again to follow the next ridge. Loads on two-wheeled carts had to be constantly shifted to the back during descents and to the front during ascents so that the animals could draw efficiently.

In medieval and later times, ridgeways in England were used as drovers roads.

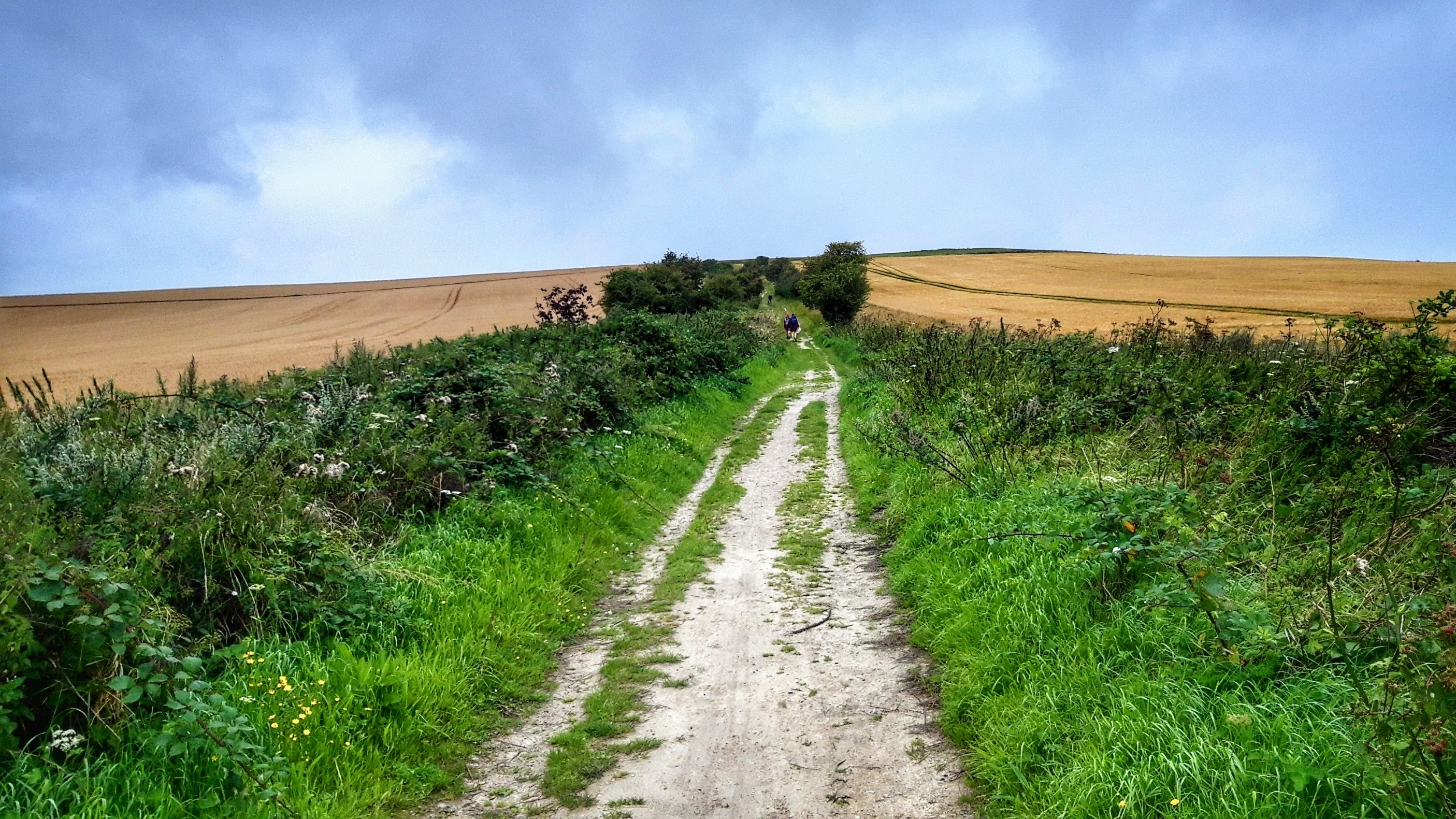
The width of the Ridgeway ascending Whitehorse Hill was fixed when the downland was enclosed in the 18th century

Since ridgeways were informal routes, and the rounded tops of many British and German ridges might be hundreds of metres wide, the track might change seasonally, or spontaneously, if any land alongside the trail appeared drier and firmer. But where the tracks were seen as marking boundaries, the course could no longer change without causing a property dispute. English ridgeway routes became fixed in the course of enclosures beginning about 1750.

Notable prehistoric ridgeways include:

in England

- The Ridgeway between Avebury and Streatley in southern England
- The Icknield Way on the escarpment of the Chiltern Hills and extending towards Norfolk in southern England
- The Old Shaftesbury Drove and the Ox Drove leading from Shaftesbury and Blandford to Salisbury

in Germany

- The Rennweg (Arnsberger Wald), an old trade route along the Arnsberg Forest
- The Brüderstrasse between Cologne and Siegen, Germany
- The Rennsteig from Gerstungen through the Thuringian mountains of Germany, restored from 1896 onwards as a 169-kilometre trail

== Evaluation ==
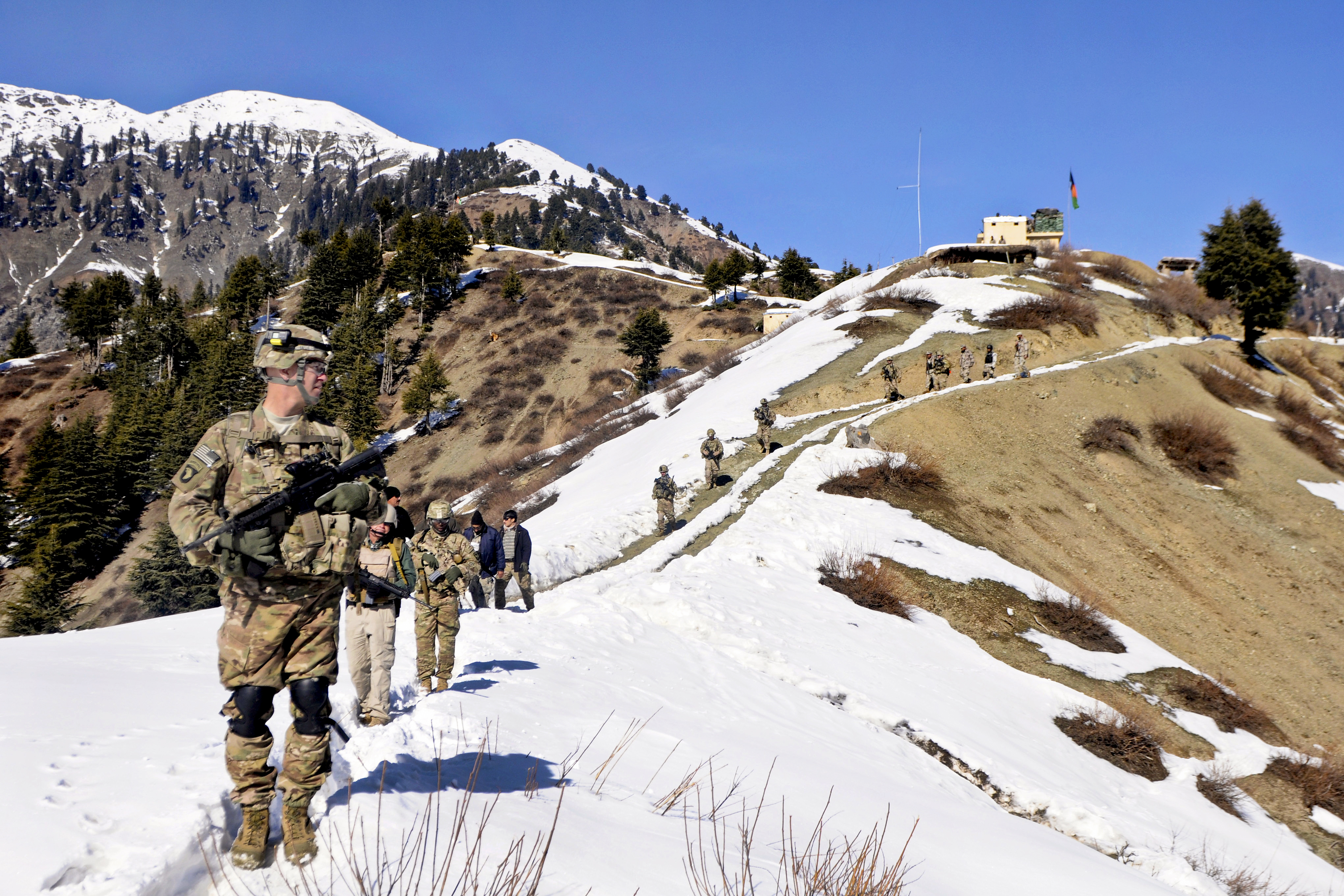
Modern, informal military ridge trail (Picture: Afghanistan-Pakistan border)

Some modern authors have suggested several advantages a ridgeway might possess:

- A ridgeway trail preserves itself without paving and constant maintenance, which were not available in medieval or early modern times in Europe.
- A watershed route can cover long distances without crossing water: valley roads require fords or bridges over tributary streams.
- In some landscapes, a line along a hill is more direct, whereas valley routes tend to meander.
- Routes well away from arable land in valleys can avoid tolls and customs charges imposed by land-owners or potentates.
- Despite laws on rights of way, lowland farmers encroach on paths which they themselves do not use. Travellers can bypass villages on higher ground, which has little agricultural value.
- Treeless hilltops may be safer from attack by robbers or fierce animals than densely forested valleys.

== Demise ==
Some ridgeway routes were adopted and paved by the Romans, even though the prevailing Roman road-construction practice was to build straight roads from point to point, rising and falling with the landscape.

Some German ridgeways were deliberately closed to force traffic into towns. In one instance, the central purpose of the Rheingauer Gebück, a 38-kilometre fence erected in the 12th century, may have been to close down a German ridgeway and force traffic onto the Rhine river. Many ridgeways have continued in use with macadam or paved surfaces in modern times. Others fell into disuse when more level paved routes, either along valley bottoms or cut transversely along hillsides, were built parallel to them.

Noting the existence of such parallel routes, antiquarians in Britain came to associate ridgeways culturally with ancient Britons. However the evidence for the great antiquity of ridgeway routes is ambiguous. In the modern era, new cart tracks have generally avoided inhospitable high ground: the 1840s and 1850s Wagon Trails from the Missouri River to Oregon and California – rutted trails in bare earth – generally followed low courses.

== Rediscovery ==
In Britain, the term ridgeway has been in continuous use since Anglo-Saxon times as a generic term to distinguish any high travel route from a lower one. The earliest extant written form is spelled hrycweg, dating from 938. In German, a variety of terms of similar date match the concept of a ridgeway: Rennweg (since circa 860: Rennewec), Rennstieg (1162: Rinnestich), Bergstrasse (C9: Birgistrotun) and hohe Strasse (circa 1000 Howestraze).

A revival of interest in ancient roads in the 19th century brought the concept back into common use. Although the Great Ridgeway northwest of London was the best known of such routes, 19th-century British antiquarians rediscovered numerous other local ridgeways and speculated that names such as Ryknild Street (a valley route) contained the word ridge in modified form. Scholars such as Georg Landau (1807–1865) began mapping and walking ancient ridgeway roads across Germany in the 19th century.

Recording prehistoric ridgeways today can be difficult. Trails only lightly worn into soil along ridge lines are generally no longer visible, but their courses are sometimes marked by modern roads and footpaths that have perpetuated the ridgeway routes.

A ridgeway previously used by carts often remains physically evident in the form of a hollow way: a trench or fosse eroded deep into the soil by constant passage of wheels and hooves. These are most common at inclines. Sleds, axles scraping the soil between wheel ruts, locked wheels skidding downhill and heavy weights dragged over the ground to brake the carts' descents would all continue eroding the surface down to the bedrock, if any, which then forms a natural pavement.

When it rains, the mud and debris in an inclined hollow way tend to be washed down the channel, slowly flushing it out and leaving banks on either side where hedgerows may develop and collect more material. Hollow ways can of course occur in any firm-ground trackway, not just in ridgeway sections. On level sections of a ridgeway, banks are less common, perhaps because travellers avoided large puddles and constantly changed the courses, or because any banks eroded.

== Recreational ==
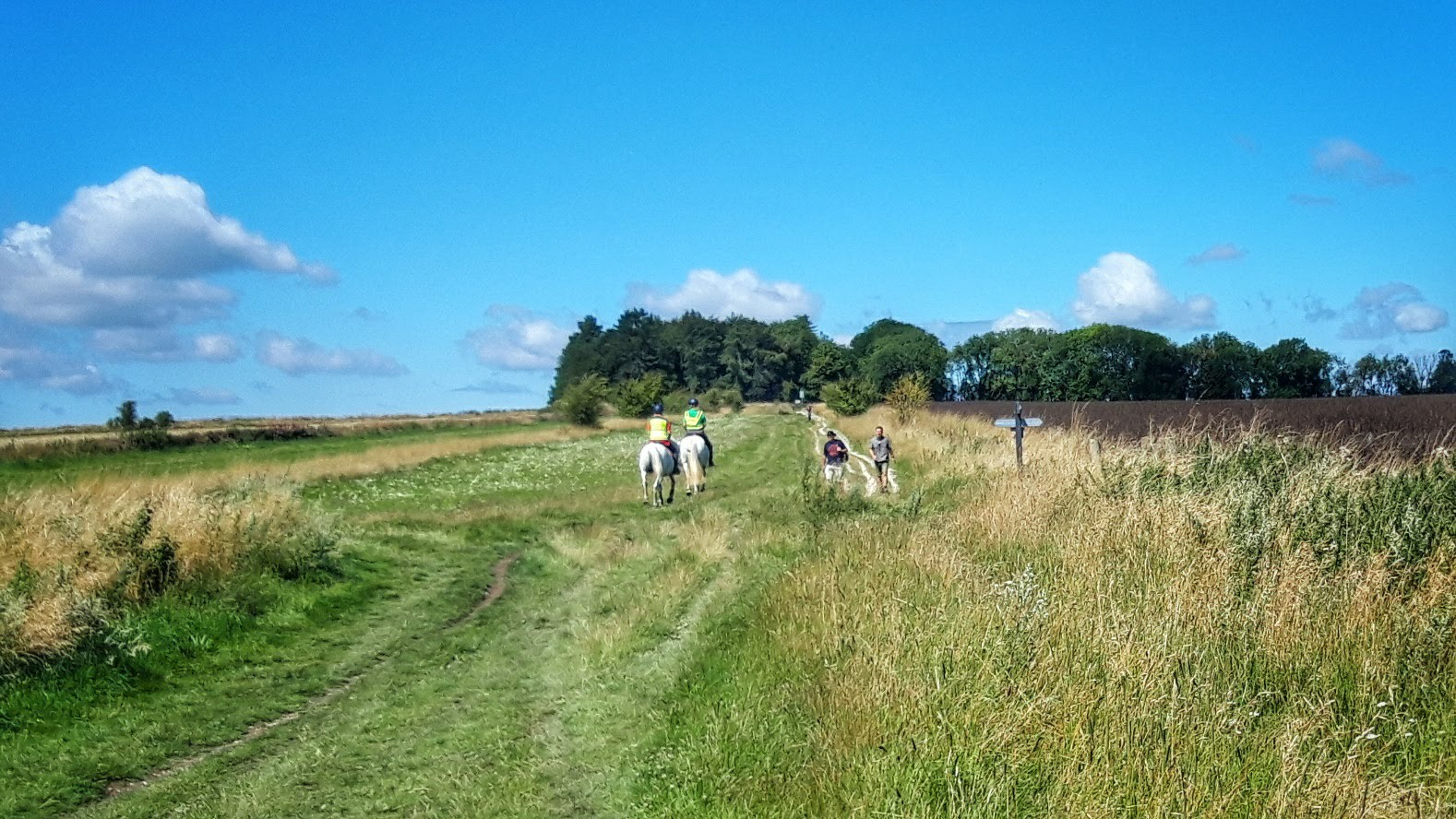
Riders and walkers on the Ridgeway National Trail, a recreational route (established in 1973) following the course of a much older ridgeway

From the 19th century onwards, old ridgeways which had not been converted into highways were often revived by hiking clubs or tourism authorities, marked out as scenic trails for walking, horse-riding or mountain biking far from the disturbances of motor traffic. An 1890 Baedeker guide recommended walks on The Ridgeway, and efforts to give that ridgeway legislative recognition began in 1947.

Some completely new recreational ridgeways have been devised where there was no tradition of the route being used for trade in previous centuries. Examples include the Kammweg established in 1904 in eastern Germany and the 197-kilometre Wessex Ridgeway in England, devised in the 1980s by the Ramblers Association, following ridges between the Atlantic coast and Avebury, with a preference for firm paths, good scenery and free access.

== See also ==
- Ancient trackway
- Causeway
- Ford (crossing)
- Hollow way
- Drainage divide
- Ridge
- List of ancient roads
- Trade route
- Salt road
