= Holzhau =

- Ortsteil of Rechenberg-Bienenmühle
- Interactive map of Holzhau
- Location within Germany Location within Saxony
- Coordinates: 50°44′1″N 13°35′19″E
- Country: Germany
- State: Saxony
- District: Mittelsachsen
- Municipality: Rechenberg-Bienenmühle
- Time zone: UTC+01:00 (CET)
  - Summer (DST): UTC+02:00 (CEST)
- Postal codes: 09623
- Dialling codes: 037327

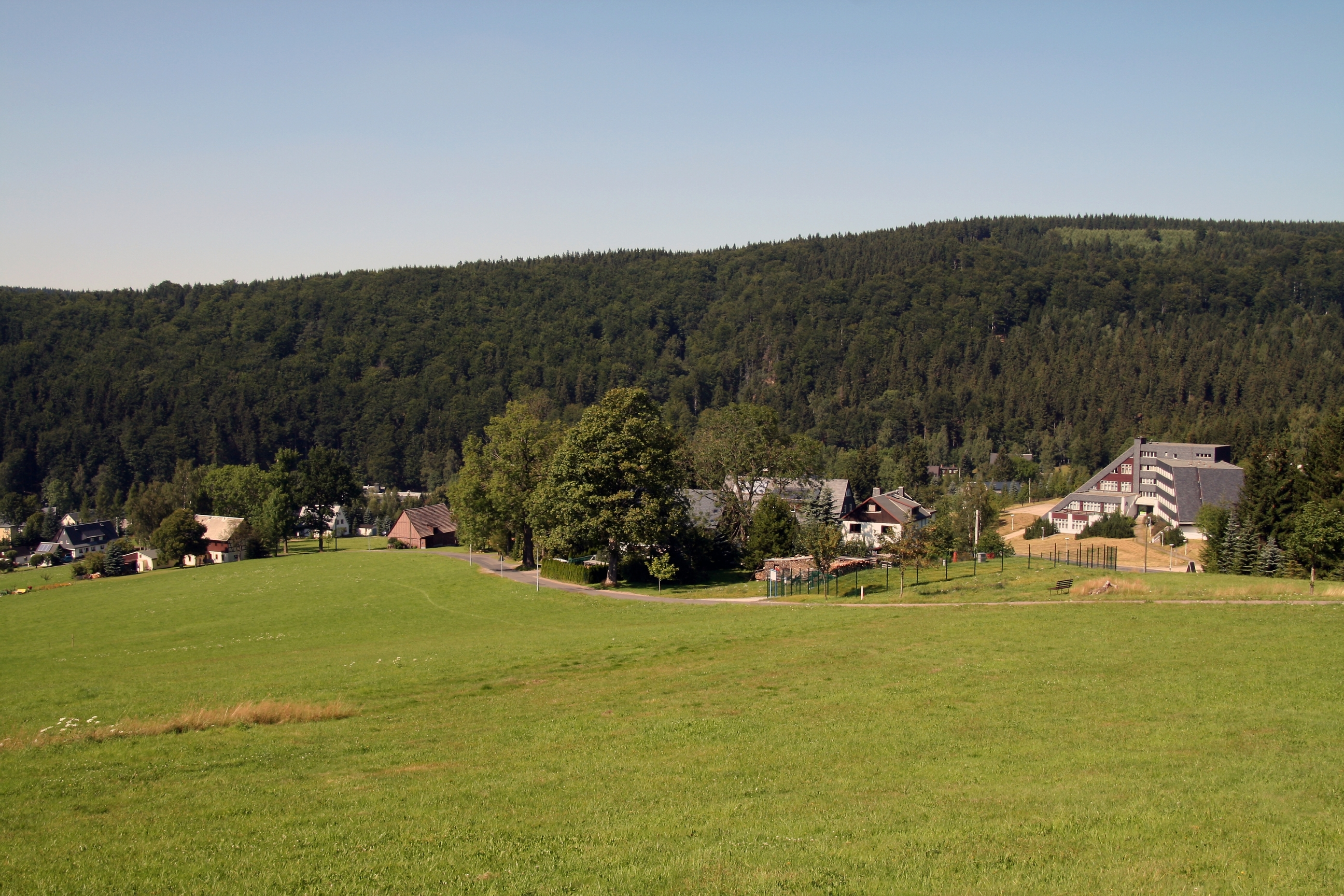
View of the village

Holzhau is a village in East Germany that has been part of the municipality of Rechenberg-Bienenmühle in the Eastern Ore Mountains since 1994.

== Transport ==
Holzhau is the terminus of the Freiberg Railway, that is operated by Rhenus Veniro.
