= Cämmerswalde =

- Ortsteil of Neuhausen/Erzgeb.
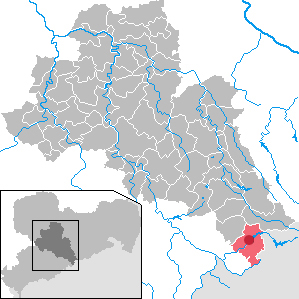
- Location of Cämmerswalde in Mittelsachsen District and the municipality of Neuhausen/Erzgeb.
- Interactive map of Cämmerswalde
- Location within Germany Location within Saxony
- Coordinates: 50°42′35″N 13°30′05″E
- Country: Germany
- State: Saxony
- District: Mittelsachsen
- Municipality: Neuhausen/Erzgeb.
- Elevation: 558 m (1,831 ft)

Population (2012)
  - Total: 589
- Time zone: UTC+01:00 (CET)
  - Summer (DST): UTC+02:00 (CEST)
- Postal codes: 09544
- Dialling codes: 037327

The village of Cämmerswalde in the municipality of Neuhausen/Erzgeb is in the south of the Saxon district of Mittelsachsen in eastern Germany. The state-recognised spa resort with its 800-year-old history, lies near Seiffen in the eastern part of the Western Ore Mountains not far from the Czech border. The village is a classic Waldhufendorf, with a length of over five kilometres. Cämmerswalde is divided into Oberdorf, Mitteldorf and Niederdorf (upper, middle and lower village). Since 1994, Cämmerswalde has belonged to the municipality of Neuhausen/Erzgeb, but used to be an independent parish with the hamlets of Deutschgeorgenthal, Haindorf and, from 1924, Neuwernsdorf and Rauschenbach.

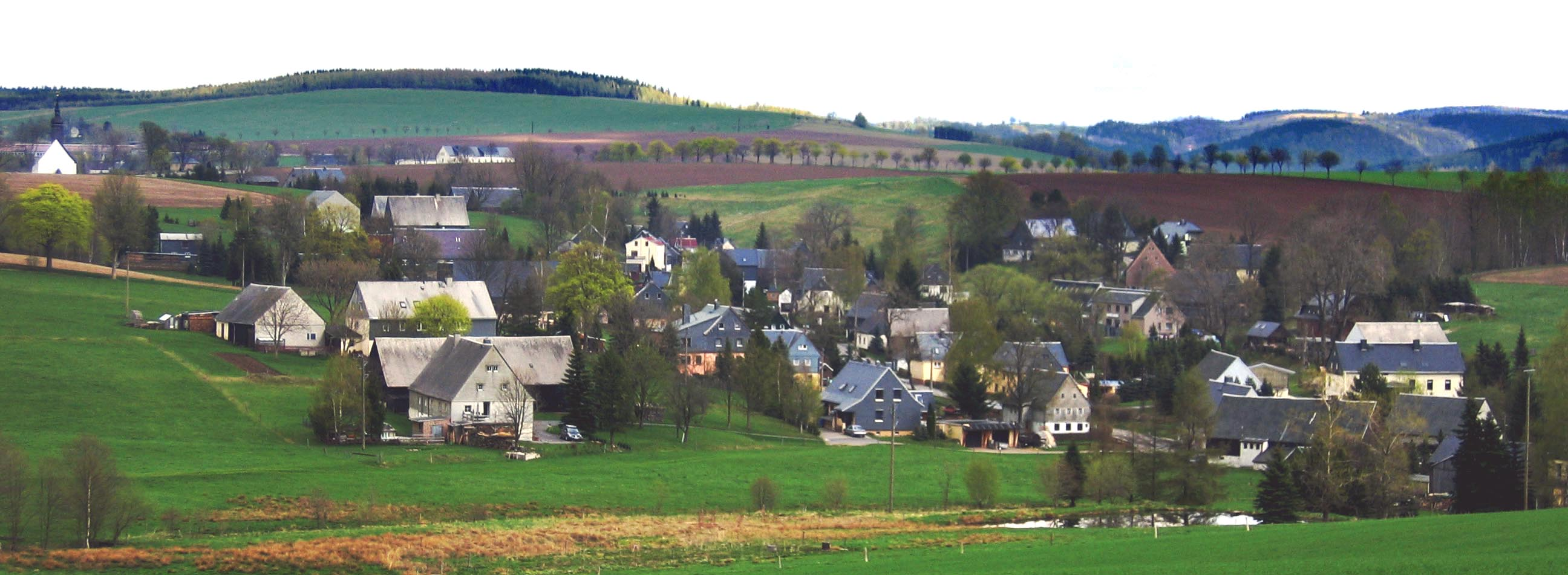
View of the village

== Literature ==
- Festschrift 750 Jahre Cämmerswalde. Reinhard Rodefeld, 1957
- Festschrift 800 Jahre Cämmerswalde. Festausschuss, Reinhold Hegewald, 2007
- Um Olbernhau und Seiffen. Edition no. 1 Akademie-Verlag Berlin, Berlin 1985 (Werte unserer Heimat. Vol. 43).
- Max Rennau: Zur ältesten Geschichte der Kirche in Cämmerswalde. Erzgebirgischer Generalanzeiger, 1930
- Historisches Ortsnamenbuch von Sachsen. 3 volumes, ed. by Ernst Eichler and Hans Walther, revised by Ernst Eichler, Volkmar Hellfritzsch, Hans Walther and Erika Weber (sources and research into Saxon history 21), Berlin, 2001, Vol. I, p. 135
- Beschreibende Darstellung der älteren Bau- und Kunstdenkmäler des Königreichs Sachsen. 41 eds., Eds. 1–15 revised by Richard Steche, Eds. 16–41 revised by Cornelius Gurlitt, Dresden, 1882–1923, Ed. 3, p. 3
- Schumann, August (1817). "Cämmerswalde". Vollständiges Staats-, Post- und Zeitungslexikon von Sachsen (in German). Vol. 4. Zwickau. p. 410.
