= Neuwernsdorf =

- Ortsteil of Neuhausen/Erzgeb.
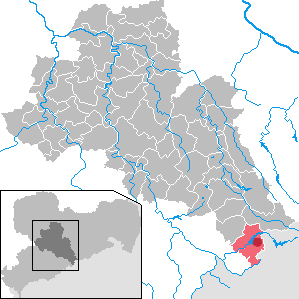
- Location of Neuwernsdorf in the district of Mittelsachsen
- Interactive map of Neuwernsdorf
- Location within Germany Location within Saxony
- Coordinates: 50°42′35″N 13°30′05″E
- Country: Germany
- State: Saxony
- District: Mittelsachsen
- Municipality: Neuhausen/Erzgeb.
- Elevation: 590 m (1,940 ft)

Population (2008-12-31)
  - Total: 130
- Time zone: UTC+01:00 (CET)
  - Summer (DST): UTC+02:00 (CEST)
- Postal codes: 09544
- Dialling codes: 037327

Neuwernsdorf is a village in the municipality of Neuhausen/Erzgeb. in the extreme south of the Saxon district of Mittelsachsen, immediately next to the Czech border by Český Jiřetín and the Rauschenbach Dam.

== Literature ==
- Festschrift 750 Jahre Cämmerswalde. Reinhard Rodefeld, 1957
- Festschrift 800 Jahre Cämmerswalde. Festausschuss, Reinhold Hegewald, 2007
- Cämmerswalde parish archives
- Um Olbernhau und Seiffen. Edition no. 1 Akademie-Verlag Berlin, Berlin 1985 (Werte unserer Heimat. Vol. 43).
- Gazettes for the parishes of Cämmerswalde and Neuhausen/Erzgebirge
- Historisches Ortsnamenbuch von Sachsen. 3 vols., ed. by Ernst Eichler and Hans Walther, worked by Ernst Eichler, Volkmar Hellfritzsch, Hans Walther and Erika Weber (sources and research into Saxon history 21), Berlin 2001, Vol. I, p. 135
- Beschreibende Darstellung der älteren Bau- und Kunstdenkmäler des Königreichs Sachsen, 41 Hefte, Heft 1–15 bearb. von Richard Steche, Heft 16–41 bearb. von Cornelius Gurlitt, Dresden 1882–1923, Heft 3, p. 3
