= Walter Gaudnek =

German painter (1931–2022)

Walter Gaudnek (1 July 1931 – 23 October 2022) was a modern artist and professor at the University of Central Florida in Orlando, Florida. Gaudnek has been one of the main representatives of pop art since the 1970s. He is considered the only artist within pop art to also deal with religious topics (e.g. Stations of the Cross in St. Michael in Schweinfurt, Germany). He is known for labyrinth installations of colorful canvases and his dedicated works of The Ten Commandments, which currently hang in Havana, Cuba.

== Biography and work ==
Gaudnek was born in Fláje, Czechoslovakia on 1 July 1931. Due to forced migration, he lost his German Bohemian homeland in 1946 after 18 months of child labor in the new Czechoslovakia. In 1947, he attended a Realschule in Schrobenhausen, and from 1948 to 1951 the Gymnasium in Ingolstadt. In 1951, he visited the Blocher School of Fine and Applied Arts in Munich. From 1952-1957, he studied at the Academy of Fine Arts, Munich (German: Akademie der Bildenden Künste München, also known as Munich Academy) as Meisterschueler of Professor Geitlinger, where he received the Jubilee scholarship of the City of Munich. In 1953, together with H.E. Gabriel, he founded the Neue Galerie in Ingolstadt and also the Galerie 17 in Munich. Gaudnek received a Fulbright Scholarship in 1957 for study and teaching in the United States. From 1957 to 1959, he worked as a teaching assistant and instructor at the University of California, Los Angeles, earning his Master of Arts degree in January 1959. After Los Angeles, Gaudnek moved to New York City. In summer of 1960, Gaudnek formed the 10/4 GROUP with artist Ray Schultz. He turned his Greenwich Village, third-floor, walk-up studio at 71 Fourth Avenue into a small gallery called the 10/4 Gallery, where he showed group and one-man exhibitions of his work and that of three or four other painters and sculptors, including Schultz, Spyer, and Hoberman. Gaudnek gained the public's attention when he was included in the Museum of Modern Art's fourteenth New Talent Exhibition: Baden, Gaudnek, Rabkin: New Talent Exhibition (20 September – 30 October 1960). In 1961, his cosmic installation entitled Unlimited Dimensions was displayed at the Martha Jackson Gallery, where it earned him the NYTIMES review "best show of the year". He taught Art History at C.W. Post in Long Island from 1964 to 1967, where he founded the C.W. Post Fine Arts Museum. In 1968, Gaudnek did his doctorate at New York University on the topic The symbolic meaning of the cross in the American Contemporary Painting. Religious themes continued to determine his work. Since 1970, he has been a professor at the University of Central Florida for painting, graphic design, art history and art theory, and in 2017 was paid $103,925 per year. Among his numerous teaching awards, he received the UCF Researcher of the Year award in 1990. He was honored in 1994 with the Sudentendeutschen Kulterpreis fuer Bildende Kunst und Architektur. In 1998, he became a full member of the Sudeten German Academy of Sciences and Arts. In 2011, Gaudnek was awarded the Public Service Medal of the municipality of Altomünster.

== Gaudnek Museum ==
The Gaudnek Europe Museum (GEM) in Altomünster was founded in 1999. On three floors Gaudnek presents roughly 400 of his paintings and sculptures. The museum displays a collection of paintings, drawings, watercolors, collages, assemblages, objects, sculptures, printmaking, the Theater of the suitcase, and an archive of photographs and documents from the years 1949–2005. In 2013 the exhibition witches and saints opened.
