= Clausnitz =

- Ortsteil of Rechenberg-Bienenmühle
- Interactive map of Clausnitz
- Location within Germany Location within Saxony
- Coordinates: 50°44′23″N 13°29′32″E
- Country: Germany
- State: Saxony
- District: Mittelsachsen
- Municipality: Rechenberg-Bienenmühle

Population (2011)
  - Total: 870
- Time zone: UTC+01:00 (CET)
  - Summer (DST): UTC+02:00 (CEST)
- Postal codes: 09326
- Dialling codes: 037327

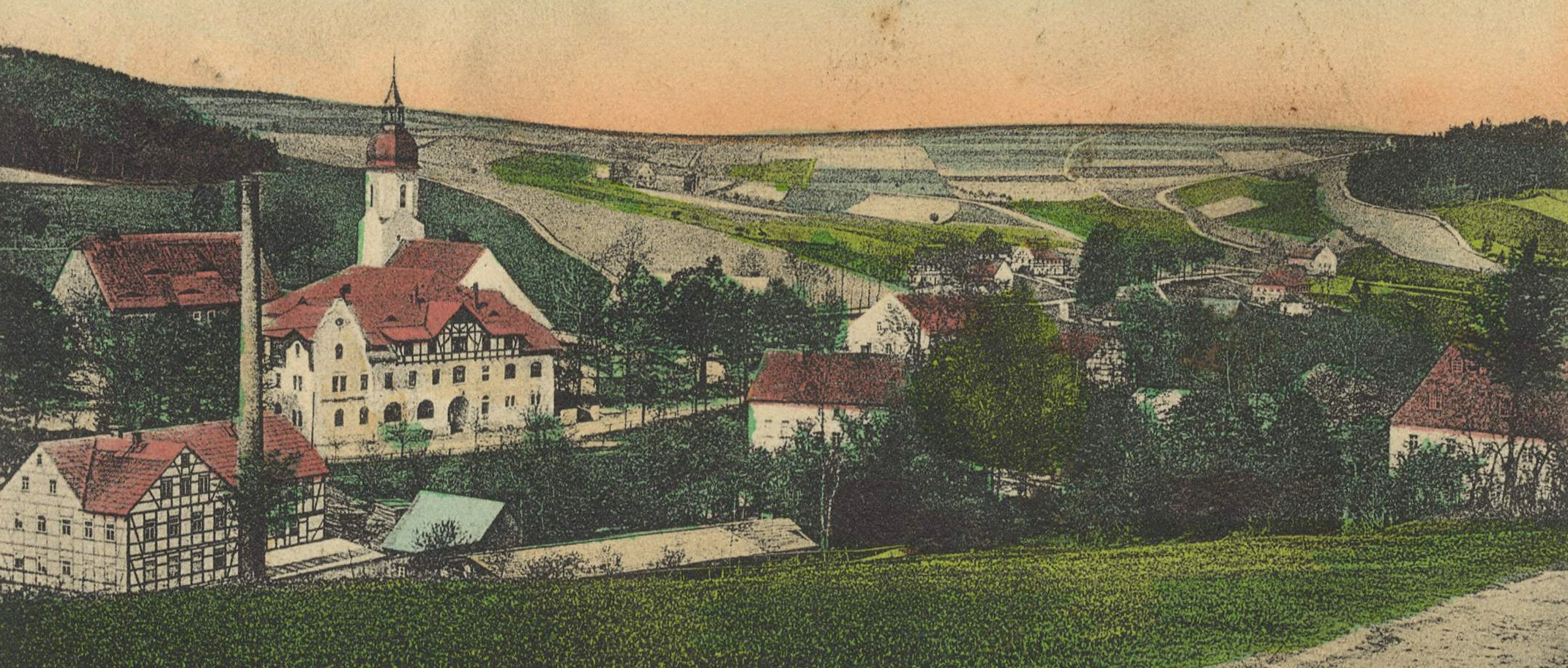
Clausnitz around 1910

Clausnitz is a village in the municipality of Rechenberg-Bienenmühle in the Saxon district of Mittelsachsen in Germany. It lies in the Eastern Ore Mountains, in the valley of the Rachel, a tributary of the Freiberger Mulde. Clausnitz emerged during the clearings of the 12th century. It is a typical Waldhufendorf, that has preserved its tidy, village character today with its rural two- and three-sided farmsteads and timber-framed houses.

== History ==
Clausnitz was probably founded by Frankish settlers around 1200 in the course of the agricultural colonisation of the ancient forest that covered the entire Ore Mountains. Its settlement was carried out by the feudal lords at Purschenstein Castle. The village was first mentioned in the records in 1398, spelled as Clussenicz. The village name changed in the following centuries from Klawßnitz (1451) and Clawsenicz (1479) to Claußnitz (1641). Clausnitz developed quickly into a comparatively large farming village. By 1551 the place had 46 freeholding farmers (besessene Mann) and 172 other homeowners (Inwohner), i.e. a total of about 400 inhabitants. The economic basis of the village was agriculture and, in the 15th and 16th centuries, intensive mining for silver and copper ore.

On 10 July 1563 Clausnitz's priest, Wolfgang Uhle, killed the corrupt local judge, George Bieber, in a fight. The site is commemorated by the Priest Uhle Stone (Pfarrer Uhle Stein).

On 18 February 2016, about a hundred people gathered in Clausnitz and blocked a refugee bus from arriving at a local refugee shelter. During the demonstration they shouted "Go home!" and "Wir sind das Volk" ("We are the people"), a famous chant from the Monday demonstrations in East Germany.

== Mining ==
Mining activity in the small Clausnitz mining area, which was part of the Freiberg Mining Field, goes back at least to the year 1460. A concession awarded that year by Frederick II of Saxony relates to the re-opening of the mine, which indicates that the origins of mining at Clausnitz went back even further. The mining operations worked two lodes (Salomo Spat and Emanuel Stehender), which were copper veins of the gravel-lead ore formation (kb Formation). Its boom period was in the 15th and 16th century. The copper ores produced in the pits of St. Michaelis, St. Wolfgang, König Salomo, and König David were worked on-site in two stamp mills and a smelting works or were delivered to the Grünthal Mill. At König David the senior mine manager (Oberbergmeister) Martin Planer built 1562 two flatrod systems. The St. Wolfgang Pit belonged at that time to the best-known South German patrician family, the Welsers.

== Places of interest ==
- Neugrabenflöße
- St. Michael's Gallery (St. Michaelis Stolln)
- Village church: The Clausnitz church was used in the pre-Reformation period as a pilgrimage church. The present building dates to 1696. Of note are the wooden ceiling, the altar, the pulpit, and the font from the 17th century.

== Sources ==
- Gütergeschichte von Clausnitz, Kreis Brand-Erbisdorf. zusammengestellt aus den Gerichtsbüchern und Grundbüchern. ohne Orts- und Verlagsangabe, ca. 1959
- Schumann, August (1817). "Klaußnitz, *Claußnitz". Vollständiges Staats-, Post- und Zeitungslexikon von Sachsen (in German). Vol. 4. Zwickau. p. 604.
