= Neuhausen, Saxony =

Neuhausen/Erzgeb.
- Municipality
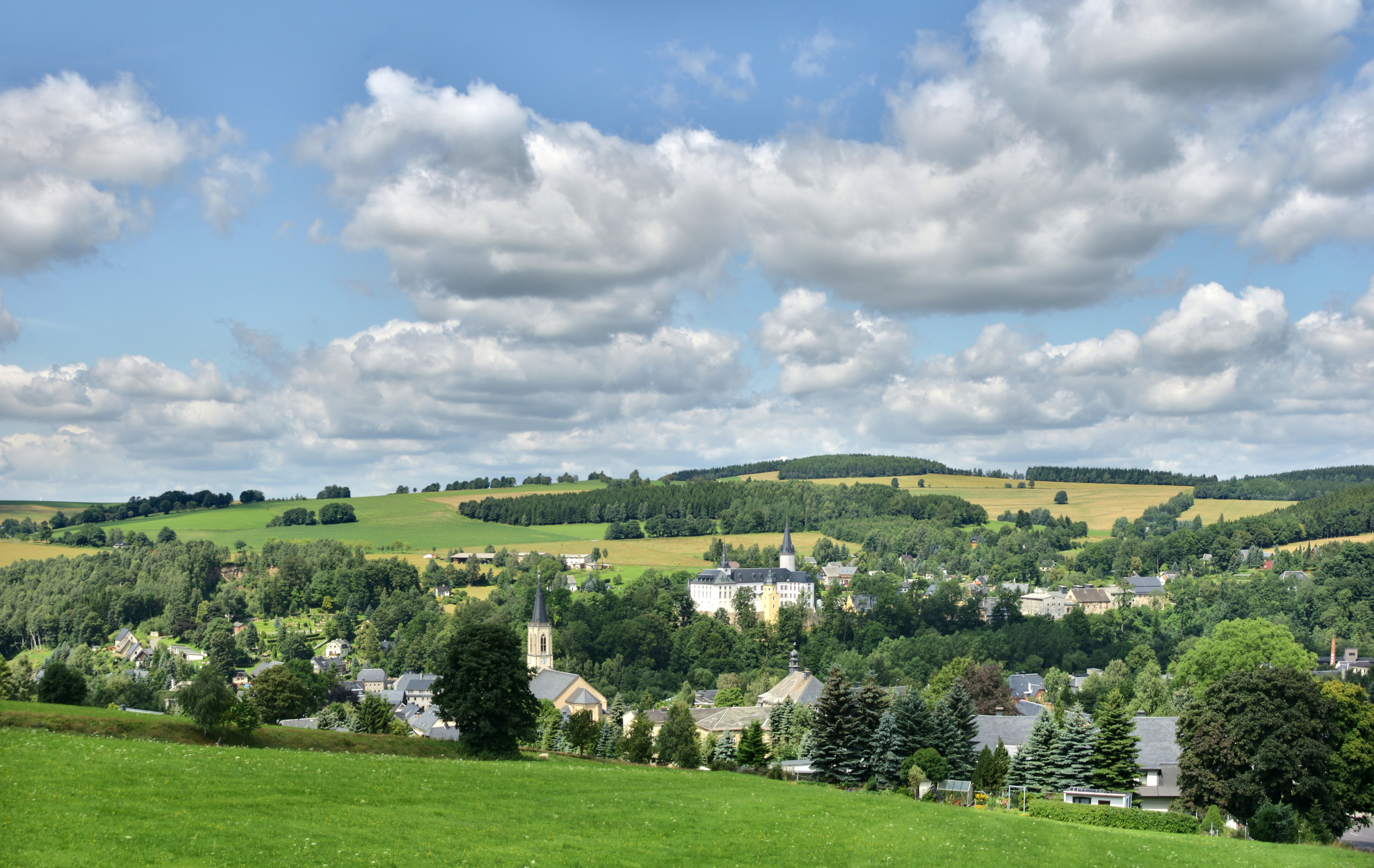
- Neuhausen/Erzgeb.

- Coat of arms

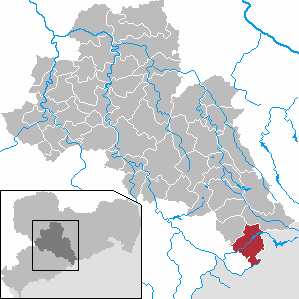
- Location of Neuhausen/Erzgeb. within Mittelsachsen district
- Interactive map of Neuhausen/Erzgeb.
- Location within Germany Location within Saxony
- Coordinates: 50°40′10″N 13°28′0″E
- Country: Germany
- State: Saxony
- District: Mittelsachsen

Government
  - Mayor (2021–28): Andreas Drescher

Area
  - Total: 48.09 km^{2} (18.57 sq mi)
- Elevation: 661 m (2,169 ft)

Population (2025-12-31)
  - Total: 2,418
  - Density: 50.28/km^{2} (130.2/sq mi)
- Time zone: UTC+01:00 (CET)
  - Summer (DST): UTC+02:00 (CEST)
- Postal codes: 09544
- Dialling codes: 037361, 037327
- Vehicle registration: FG
- Website: www.neuhausen.de

Neuhausen/Erzgeb. (German pronunciation: [nɔʏˈhaʊzn̩], lit. Neuhausen/Ore Mountains) is a municipality in the district of Mittelsachsen, in Saxony, Germany. It consists of Neuhausen proper and the Ortsteile (divisions) Dittersbach, Frauenbach, Heidelbach, Cämmerswalde, Rauschenbach, Neuwernsdorf and Deutschgeorgenthal. Neuhausen hosts the first nutcracker museum in Europe, which houses more than 5,000 examples, the largest collection of nutcrackers in the world and is also known as a location for winter sports.

== Culture and sights ==
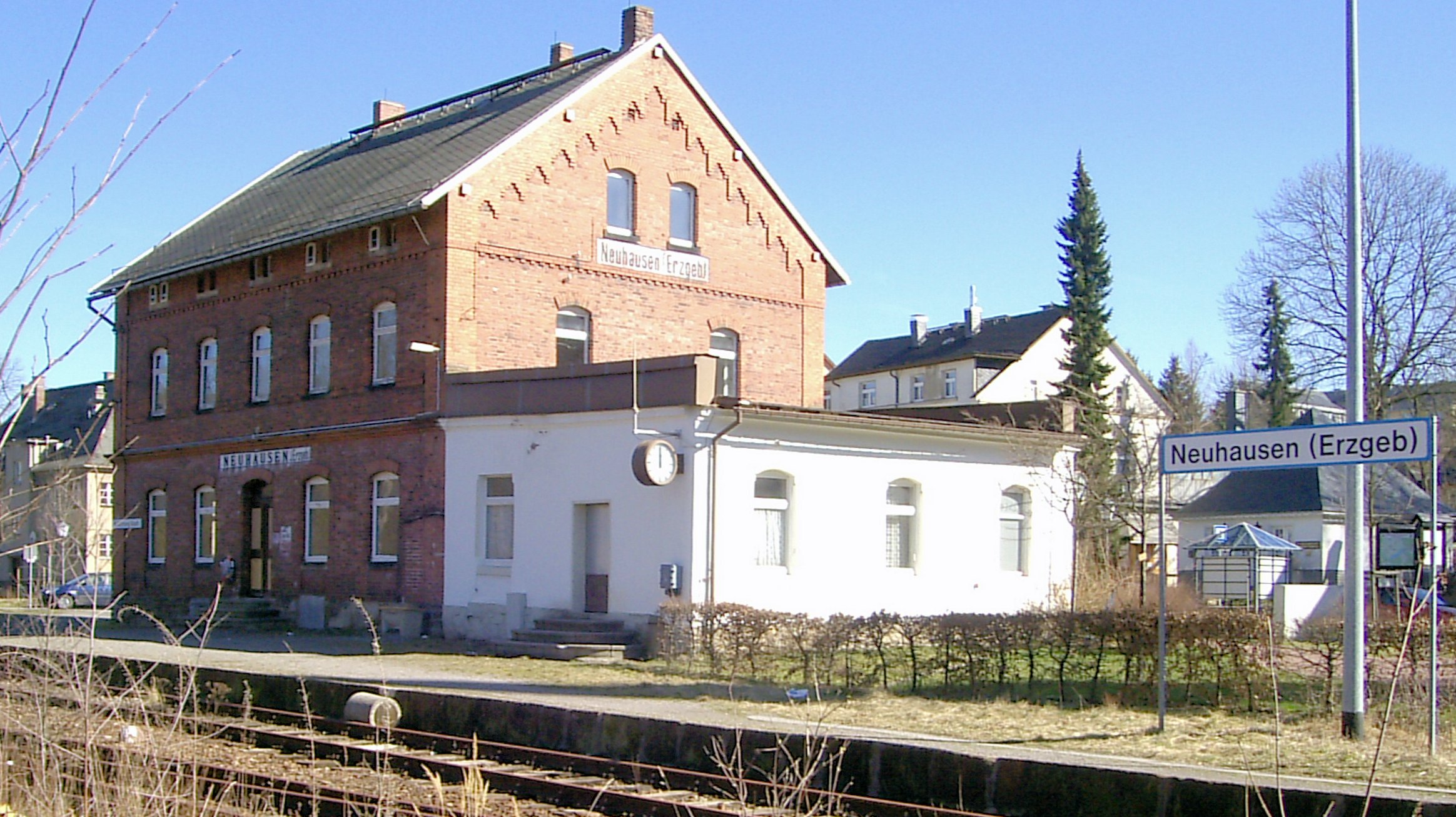
Neuhausen railway station at the end of the Pockau-Lengefeld–Neuhausen railway, which is not closed but with irregular service only

=== Museums ===
==== Europe's first nutcracker museum ====
World renown is the first and largest nutcracker museum in Europe with around 5,000 exhibits from 30 countries (as at April 2009).

==== Glassworks Museum of the Ore Mountains ====
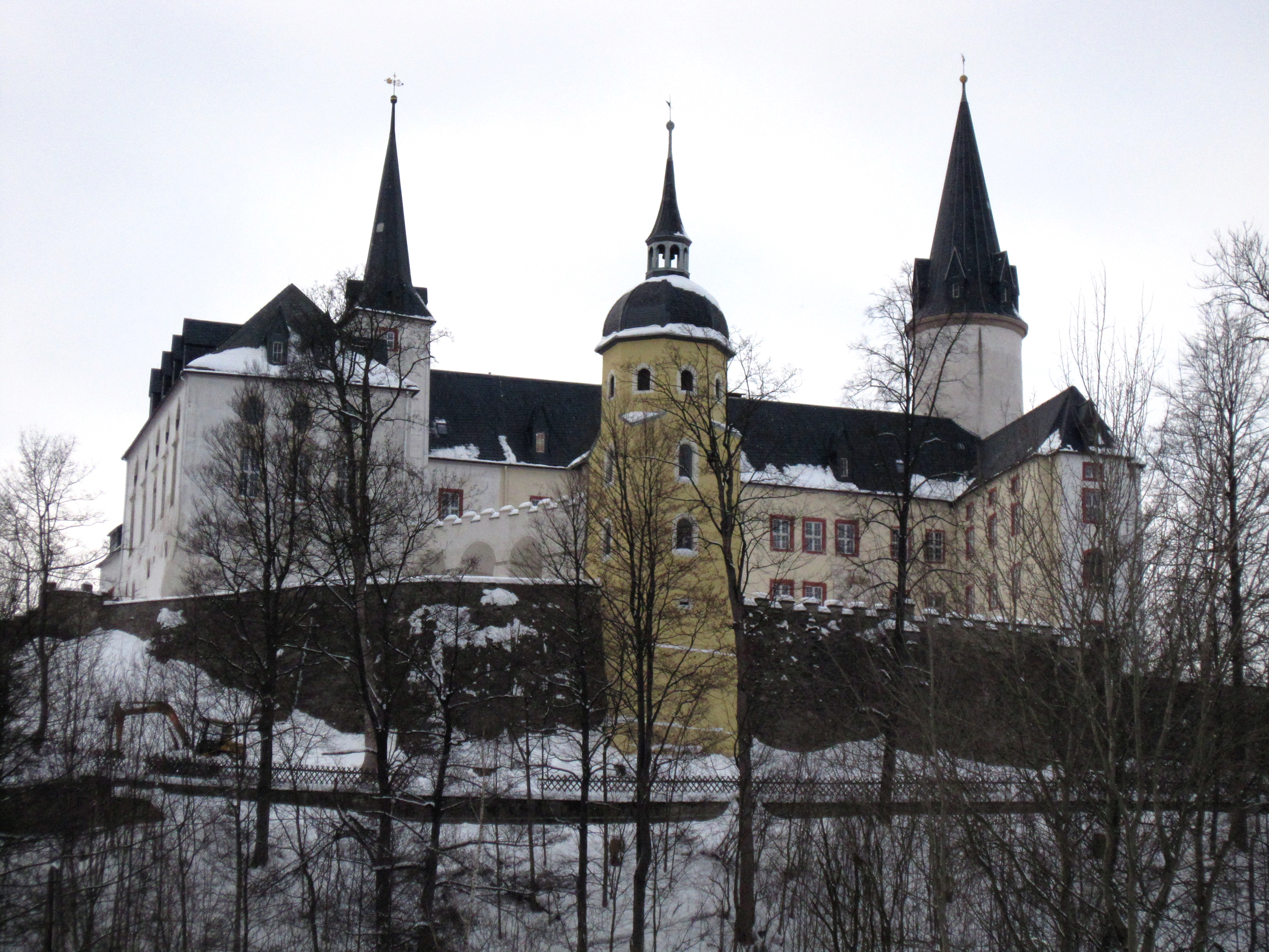
Purschenstein Castle, February 2010

The Glassworks Museum of the Ore Mountains (Glashüttenmuseum des Erzgebirges) is located in the old socage vault of Purschenstein Castle and includes a replica glassworks from the time of Georgius Agricola, a workshop and other documents and tools associated with Ore Mountain glassmaking as well as the history of Neuhausen and Purschenstein.
