= Rechenberg-Bienenmühle =

- Municipality
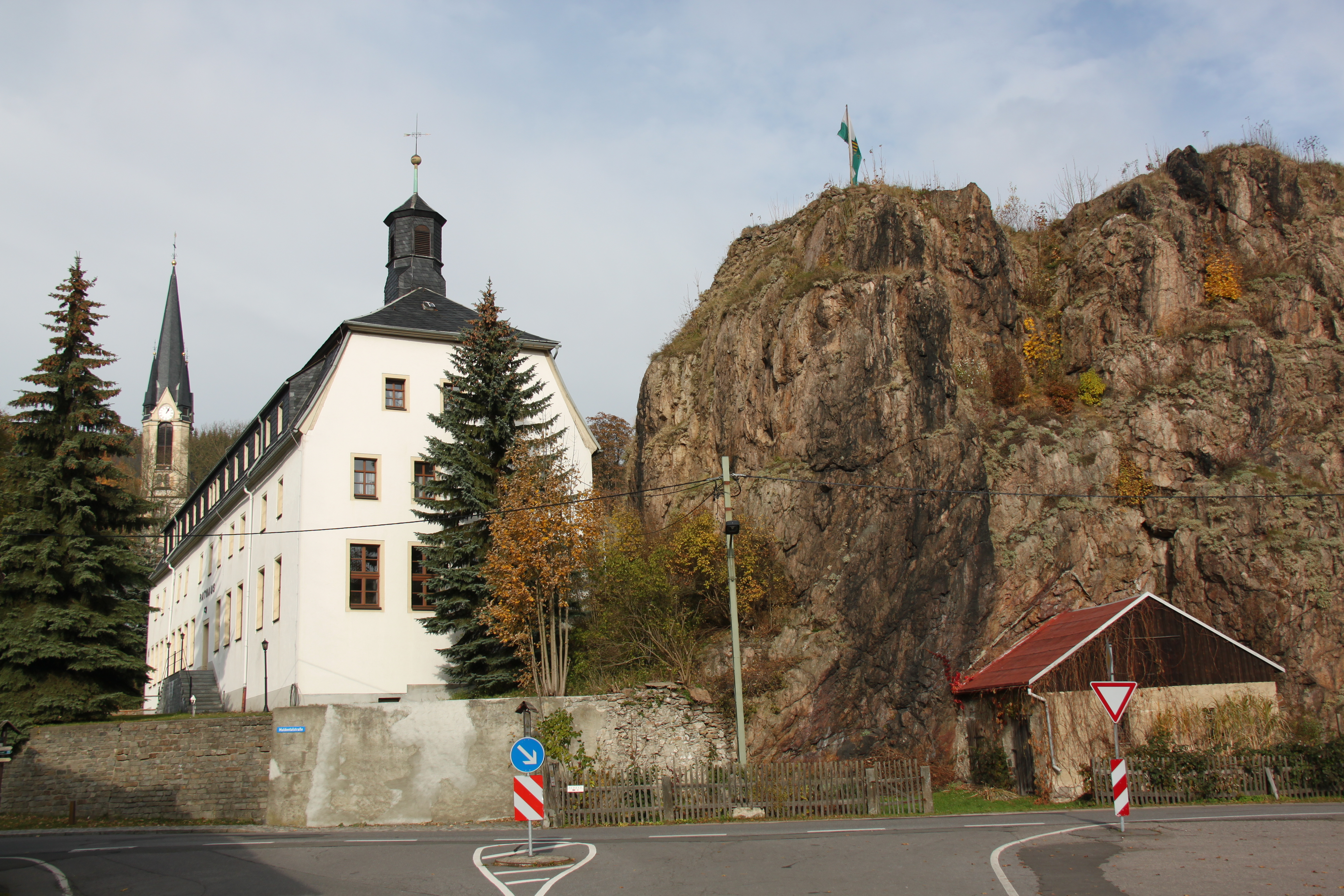

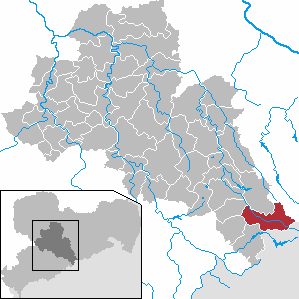
- Location of Rechenberg-Bienenmühle within Mittelsachsen district
- Interactive map of Rechenberg-Bienenmühle
- Location within Germany Location within Saxony
- Coordinates: 50°44′14″N 13°32′40″E
- Country: Germany
- State: Saxony
- District: Mittelsachsen

Government
  - Mayor (2022–29): Michael Funke

Area
  - Total: 52.49 km^{2} (20.27 sq mi)
- Elevation: 600 m (2,000 ft)

Population (2025-12-31)
  - Total: 1,707
  - Density: 32.52/km^{2} (84.23/sq mi)
- Time zone: UTC+01:00 (CET)
  - Summer (DST): UTC+02:00 (CEST)
- Postal codes: 09623
- Dialling codes: 037327
- Vehicle registration: FG

Rechenberg-Bienenmühle is a municipality in the district of Mittelsachsen, in Saxony, Germany.

== Culture and sights ==
Among the most famous attractions of the place is the Saxon Brewery Museum in Rechenberg. Rechenberg-Bienenmuhle has an historic town centre, with an ensemble of well-preserved half-timbered houses, which includes the small market place, the former manor house mansion of the ruined castle, the brewery, the timber rafter's house and the old village school. In addition to the rustic double and triple-sided farmyards in the district, the village church of Clausnitz is also worth seeing because of its remarkable interior. Remnants of the old Neugrabenflöße mining canal have also survived. This waterway between the Flöha near Fláje (Fleyh) and the Freiberger Mulde, which emptied in Clausnitz into the Rachel, was used for more than 350 years for timber rafting for the Freiberg mining region.
