= Purschenstein Castle =

12th Century Castle in Saxony, Germany

Coordinates: 50°40′35″N 13°27′48″E

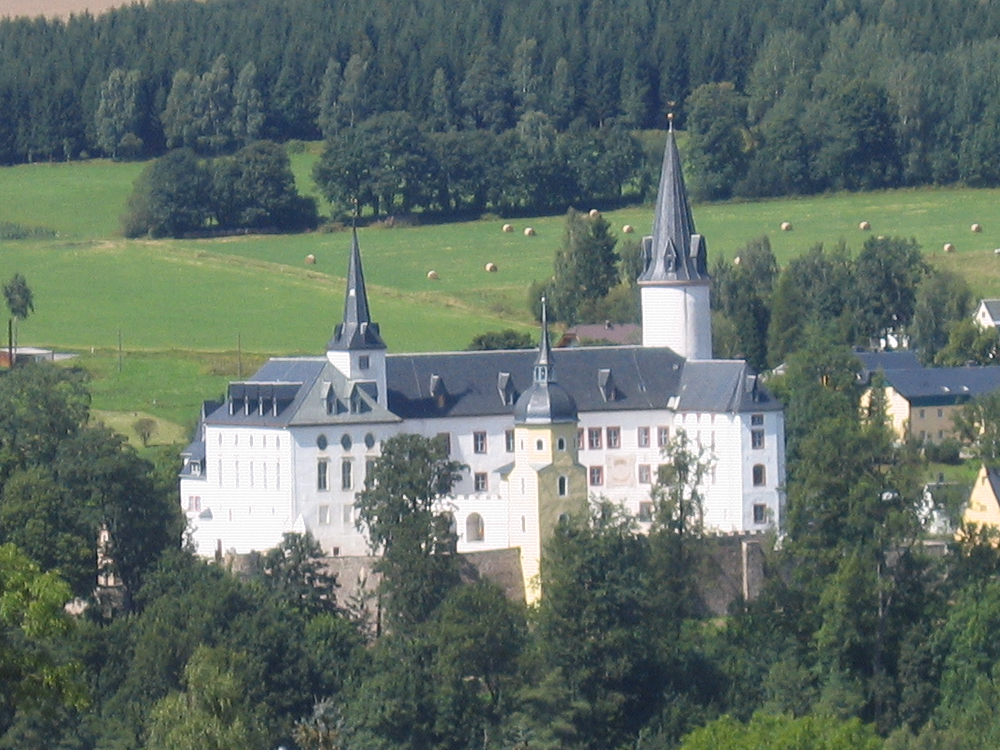
Purschenstein Castle

Purschenstein Castle (German: Schloss Purschenstein) in Neuhausen/Erzgeb. in eastern Germany was built in the late 12th century, around 1200, likely by Boresch I (Borso). The toll and escort castle protected a salt road running from Central Germany to Bohemia. This long-distance trading route, also called the Old Bohemian Track (Alter Böhmischer Steig), ran from Leipzig past present-day Neuhausen and over the Deutscheinsiedler Saddle towards Prague. The castle was among the von Schönberg family’s holdings and it remained in their possession from the mid-14th century until its expropriation in 1945. In 2005, the castle was bought by the Dutch Praagman family, who renovated and converted the premises to a hotel, the Schlosshotel Purschenstein.

== Gallery ==
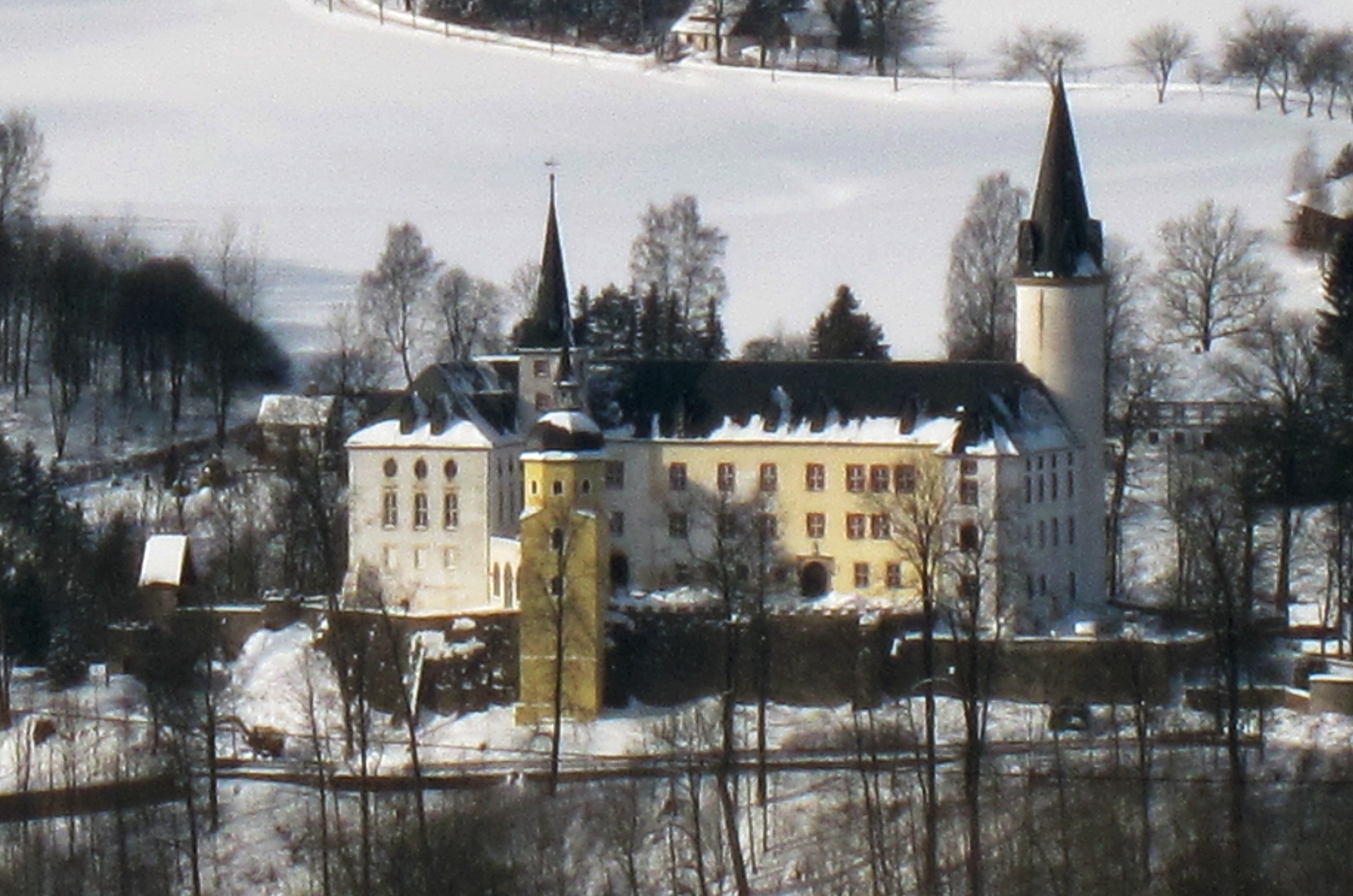
View of the snow-covered castle

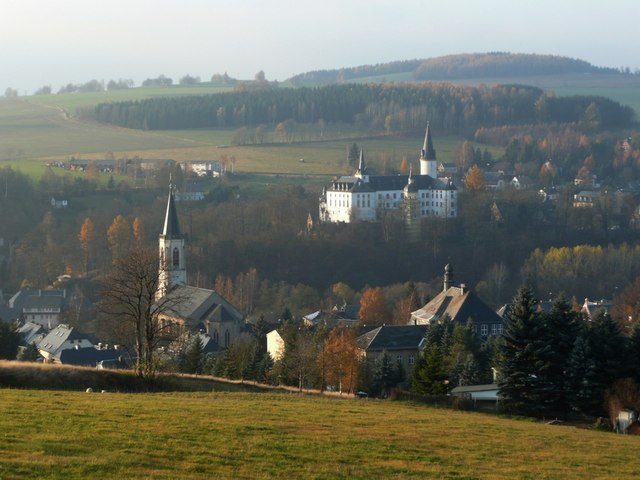
Castle and town church

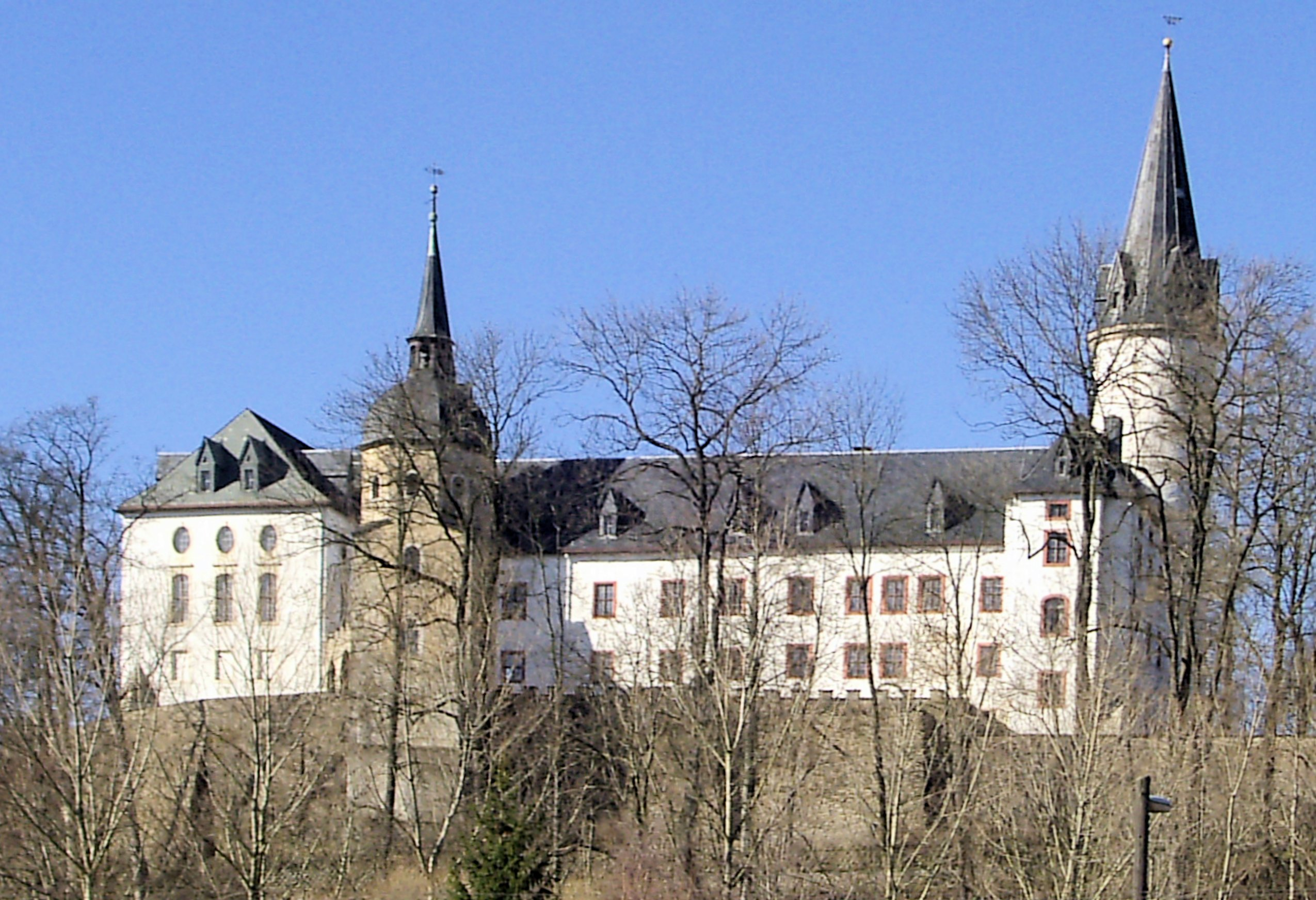
Autumnal view from the station

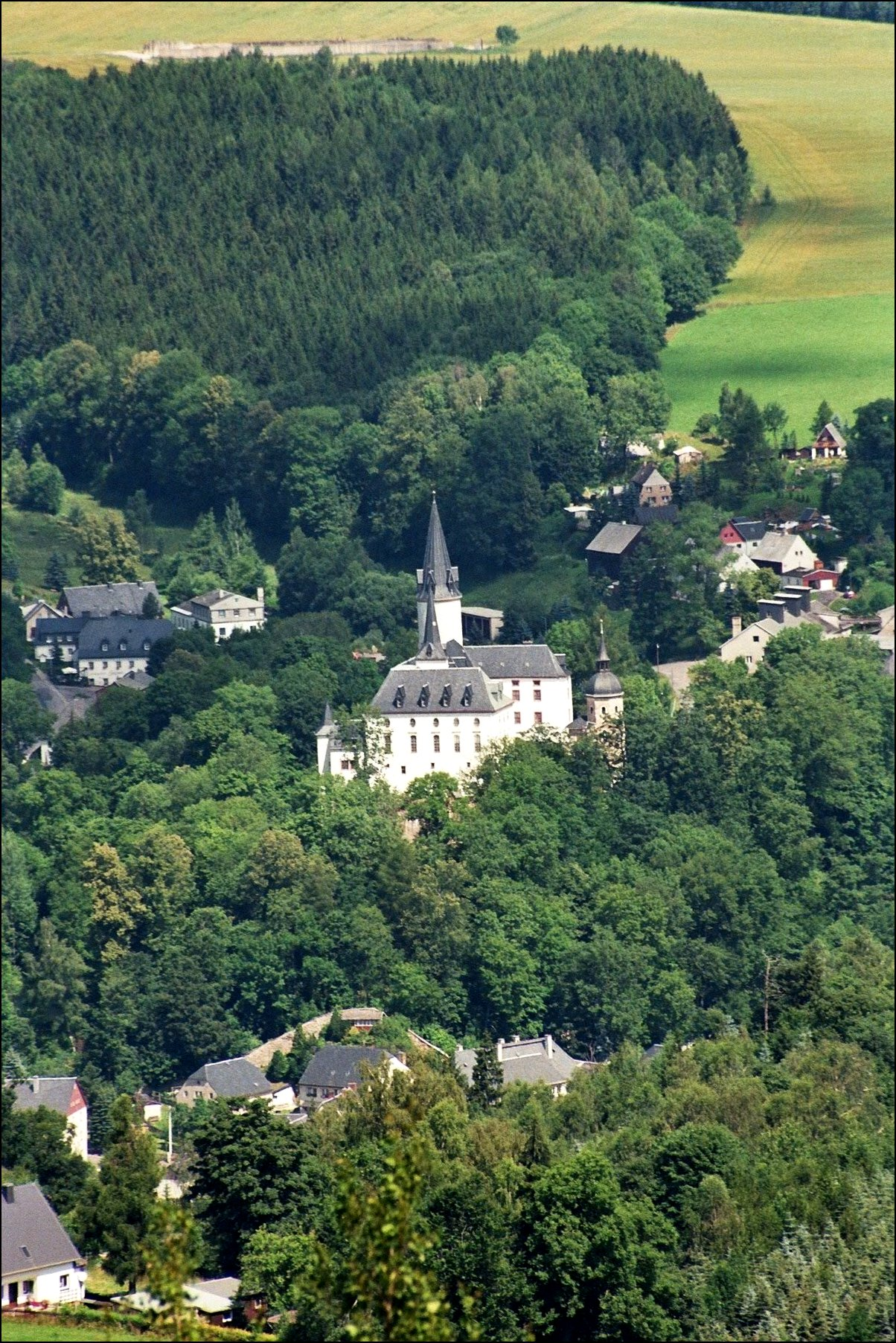
View from Schwartenberg

== See also ==
- List of castles in Saxony
- Schönberg (noble family) German wikipedia page
