= Český Jiřetín =

- Municipality
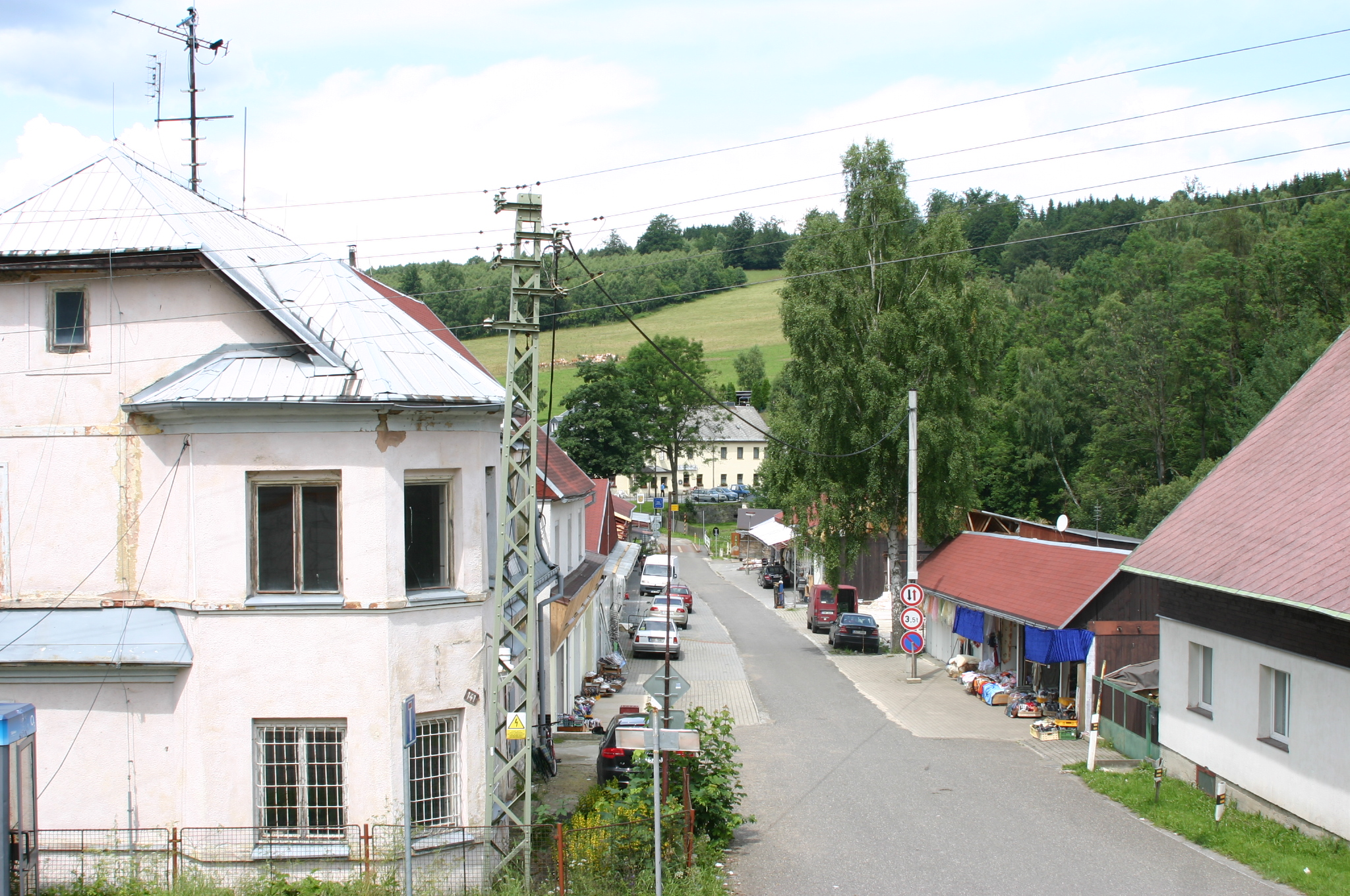
- Border crossing to Germany

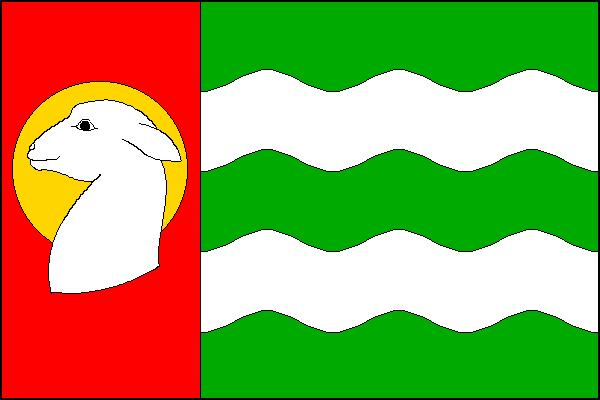
- Flag Coat of arms

- Location in the Czech Republic
- Coordinates: 50°42′27″N 13°32′51″E
- Country: Czech Republic
- Region: Ústí nad Labem
- District: Most
- First mentioned: 1787

Area
  - Total: 33.63 km^{2} (12.98 sq mi)
- Elevation: 725 m (2,379 ft)

Population (2026-01-01)
  - Total: 110
  - Density: 3.3/km^{2} (8.5/sq mi)
- Time zone: UTC+1 (CET)
  - Summer (DST): UTC+2 (CEST)
- Postal code: 436 01
- Website: www.cesky-jiretin.cz

Český Jiřetín (German: Georgendorf) is a municipality and village in Most District in the Ústí nad Labem Region of the Czech Republic. It has about 100 inhabitants.

== Administrative division ==
Český Jiřetín consists of two municipal parts (in brackets population according to the 2021 census):

- Český Jiřetín (83)
- Fláje (15)

== Etymology ==
The Czech name Jiřetín and the German name Georgendorf both means "Jiřata's/George's village". The name Český Jiřetín means "Bohemian Jiřetín".

== Geography ==
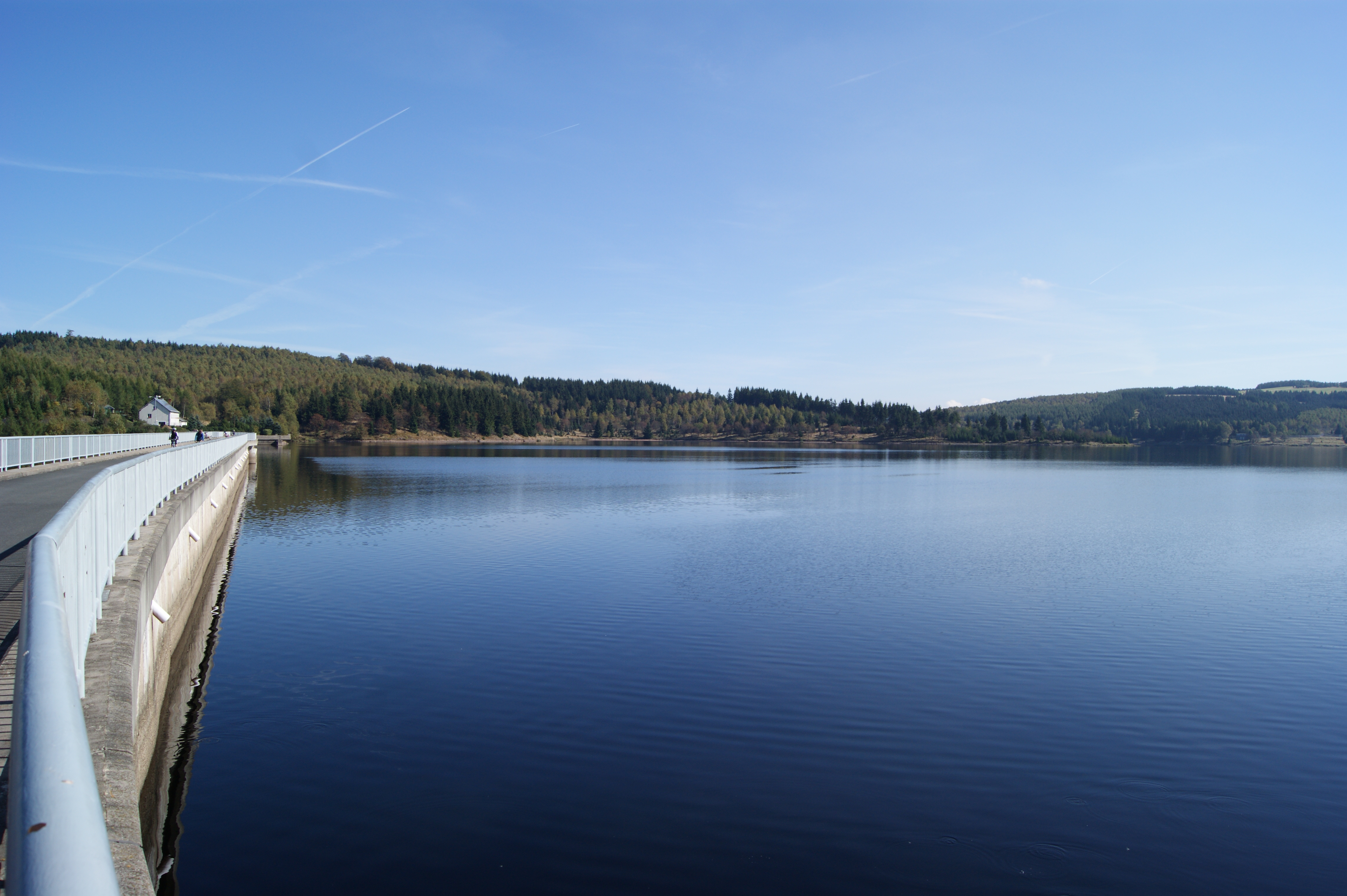
Fláje Reservoir

Český Jiřetín is located about 23 kilometres (14 mi) north of Most and 34 km (21 mi) west of Ústí nad Labem. It lies in the Ore Mountains. The highest peak is V Oboře at 889 m (2,917 ft) above sea level.

In the municipal territory is Fláje Reservoir, built in 1963 as a water source and flood protection. It has an area of 149 ha (370 acres). The dam is a concrete, pillar type (hollow inside), the only one of its kind in the country. It is protected as a technical monument.

The village forms a continuous built-up area with the village of Deutchgeorgenthal in Neuhausen municipality on the German side of the border.

== History ==
The first written mention of Český Jiřetín is from 1787.

== Demographics ==
Historical population

Year	Pop.	±%
1869	1,313	—
1880	1,394	+6.2%
1890	1,376	−1.3%
1900	1,290	−6.2%
1910	1,386	+7.4%

Year	Pop.	±%
1921	1,171	−15.5%
1930	1,249	+6.7%
1950	377	−69.8%
1961	164	−56.5%
1970	101	−38.4%

Year	Pop.	±%
1980	67	−33.7%
1991	50	−25.4%
2001	55	+10.0%
2011	71	+29.1%
2021	98	+38.0%

Source: Censuses

== Transport ==
On the Czech–German border is the road border crossing Český Jiřetín / Deutschgeorgenthal. There are no railways or major roads passing through the municipality.

== Sport ==
Český Jiřetín is known for its ski resort.

== Sights ==
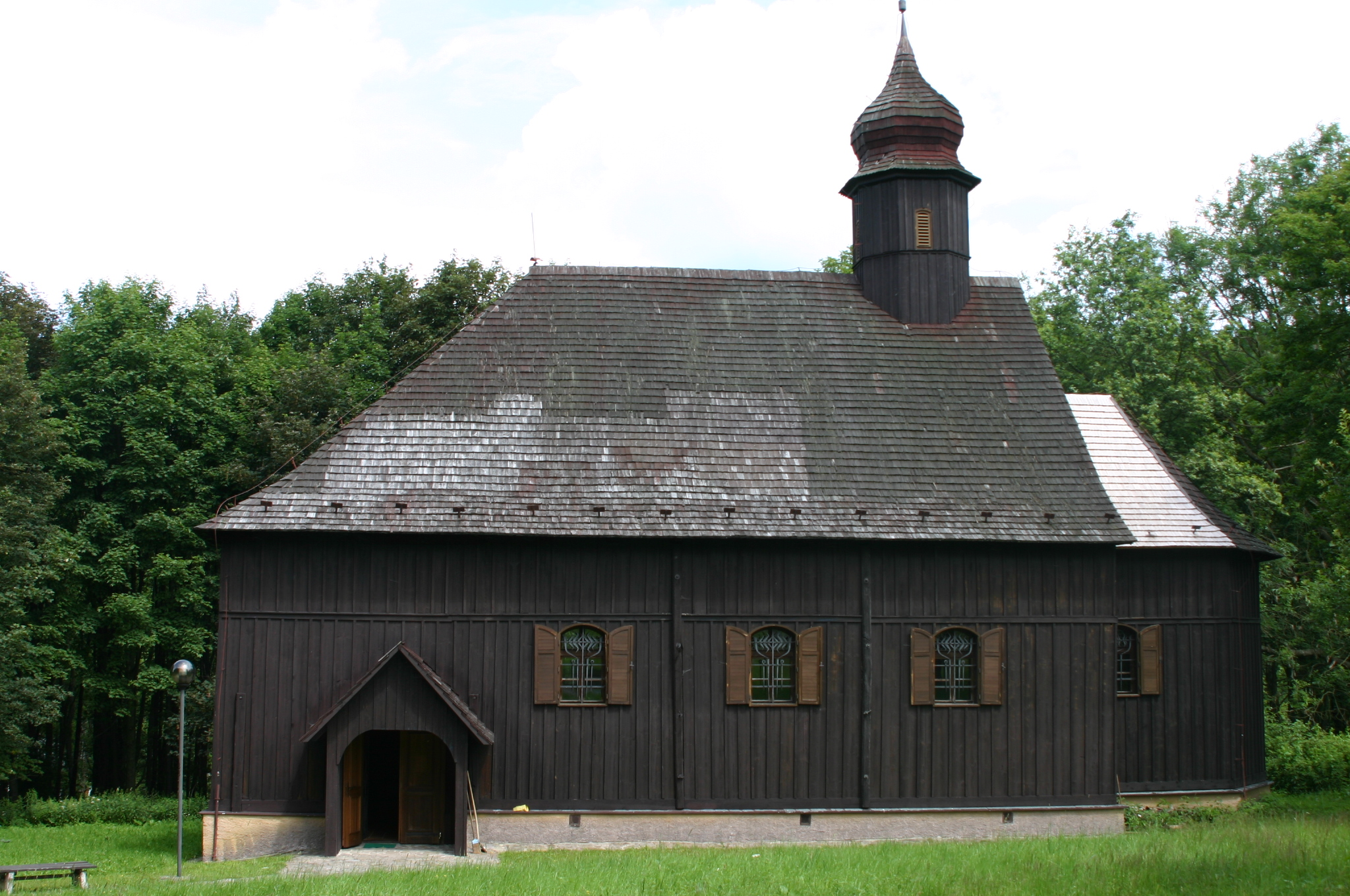
Church of Saint John the Baptist

The Church of Saint John the Baptist was built in 1653 and extended in 1669. It is one of the oldest and most valuable wooden sacred buildings in the country. Originally built in Fláje, it was moved to Český Jiřetín in 1969, and the church was thus saved from being flooded by the reservoir.

== Notable people ==
- Walter Gaudnek (1931–2022), Czech-German modern artist
