= Kohlhaukuppe =

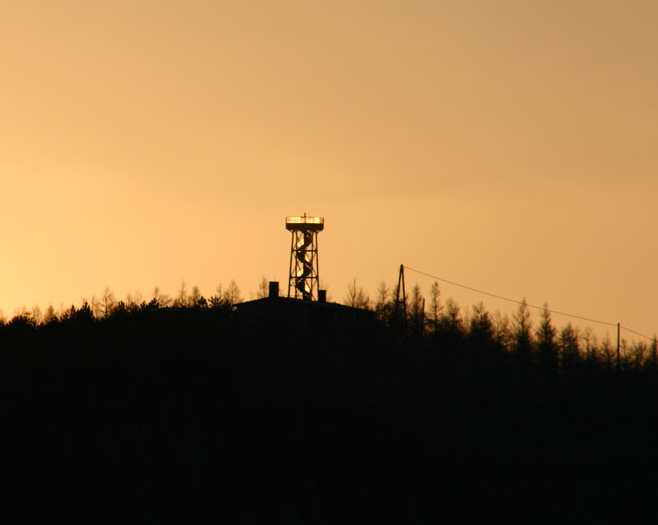
- Dusk on the Kohlhaukuppe

Highest point
- Elevation: 786 m (2,579 ft)
- Coordinates: 50°44′42″N 13°47′33″E

Geography
- Location within Saxony
- Location: Saxony (Germany)
- Parent range: Ore Mountains

Geology
- Mountain type: granite porphyry

The Kohlhaukuppe is a 786-metre-high (2,579 ft) mountain in the Eastern Ore Mountains near Geising not far from the border with the Czech Republic.

== History ==
In older documents the mountain was just called Kuppe or Koppe which means "dome-shaped hill". When, in 1889, the House of Wettin celebrated its 800th anniversary and numerous festive events were held in the Kingdom of Saxony, the mountain was renamed the Wettinhöhe ("Wetten Heights") and a nine-metre-high (30-foot), iron observation tower was built on the summit. It was inaugurated on 16 June 1889.

Next to the tower a bowery wooden building was erected as a restaurant. The mountain inn was only open in summer. After the business ground to a halt during the First World War, a new building with a massive cellar was built after the war's end that stood until 1933. In that year the mountain guesthouse was demolished at the behest of a customs inspector (Zollkommissar), because inter alia illegal leaflets had been distributed here.

After the Second World War the name Wettinhöhe was discontinued and the mountain was given its current name. In 1952 work began on rebuilding the inn. At the same time the tower was raised by 2 metres. This tower stood until 1995 and was then replaced by a steel design, that was similar to the original tower.

The inn has been open again since 1993. It holds evenings of "Myths and Magic" (Sagen und Magie). Because of the garlic dishes on the menu, the mountain is also known locally as the Knoblauchkuppe ("garlic dome").

== Routes to the summit ==
There is no direct access for private cars, the nearest option is pay car park by the Hüttenteich pond in Geising. From there two well-signed hiking trails run to the summit, either along the road or up a steeper, but shorter option uphill from the Anton Günther Stein.

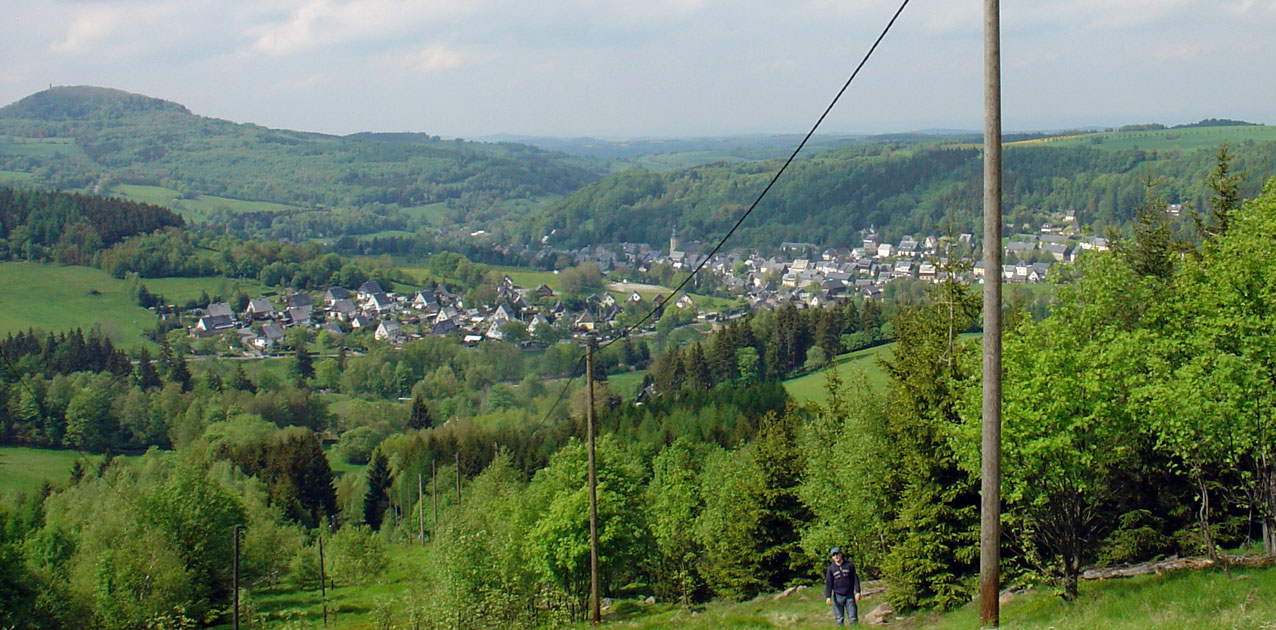
View from the Kohlhaukuppe of Geising and the Geisingberg

== Views ==
- To the north: Geising, to its left the Geisingberg, to its right the Wilisch
- To the east: the Spitzberg, right: Hoher Schneeberg
- To the southwest: Zinnwald
- To the northwest: Altenberg
- To the southeast: Vorderzinnwald, behind it the Mückentürmchen on the Bohemian side.
