= Cross-border Mining Trail =

Tourism in Germany

Coordinates: 50°43′42″N 13°48′34″E

The Cross-border Mining Education Trail (German: Grenzüberschreitender Bergbaulehrpfad, Czech: Příhraniční naučná hornická stezka) from Krupka (German: Graupen) to Geising, Altenberg, Zinnwald and Cínovec (German: Böhmisch Zinnwald) to Dubí (German: Eichwald) is a 40 km long mining history educational trail in the upper Eastern Ore Mountains in Germany and the Czech Republic. It links seventy sites (including museums, monuments, visitor mines, mining ponds and ditches, reclamations and tourist attractions) connected with the history of mining and settlement in this cross-border region of the Ore Mountains. The educational trail describes the development of what was once the most important tin mining regions in Central Europe. In order to hike the trail, a walking map is recommended that contains detailed maps and short descriptions of the waypoints en route and the opening times of the museums.

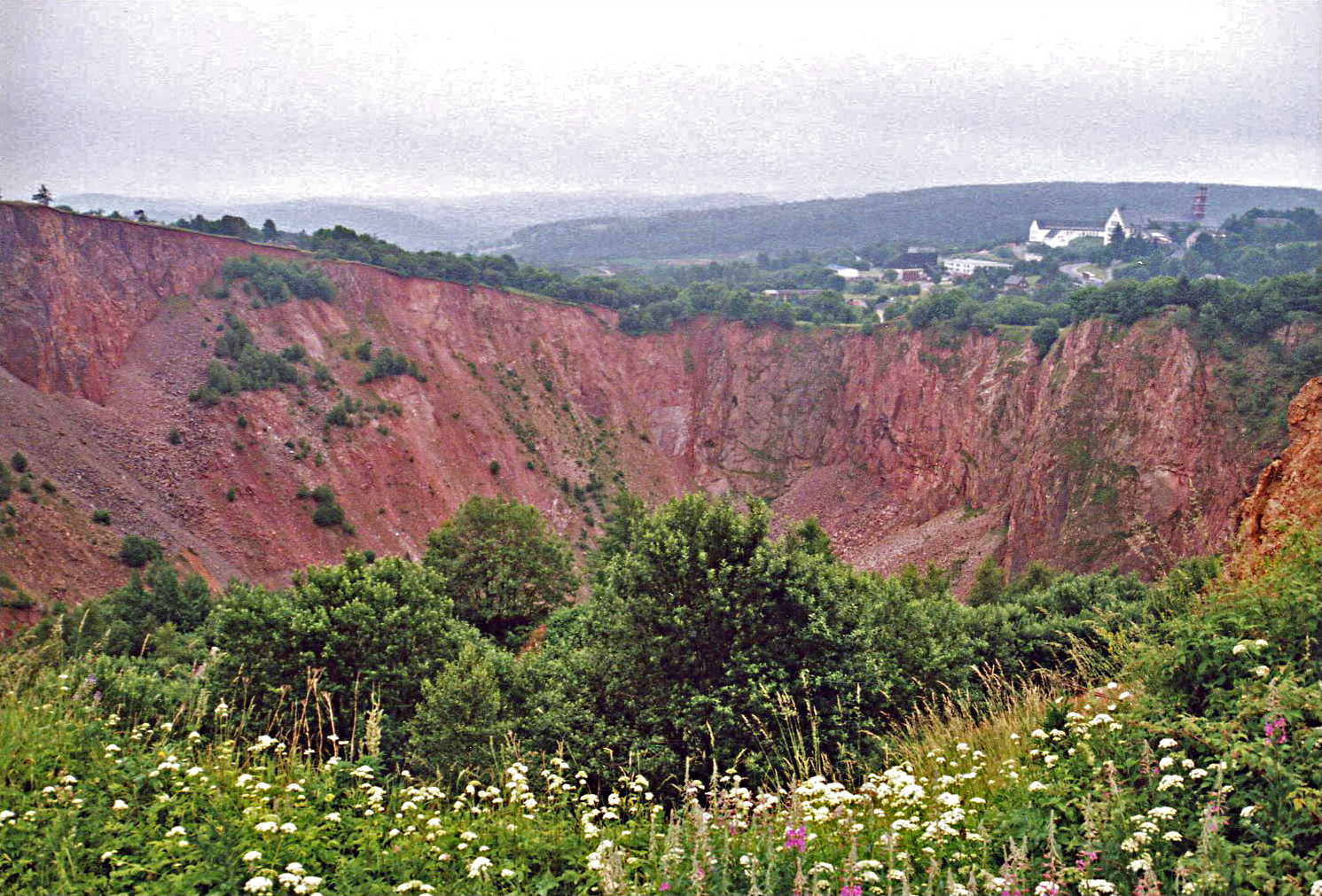
The Altenberg Pinge, a sink-hole that is an important witness to mining history in the Eastern Ore Mountains

== Location ==
The trail lies about 45 km south of Dresden on the upper slopes of the Eastern Ore Mountains. It is situated immediately on the Czech border and runs from Krupka (Graupen) via Horni Krupka (Obergraupen), the Komáří hůrka (Mückenberg mountain) and Fojtovice (Voitsdorf) to Fürstenau (the hiking trail counting as local border traffic). From Fürstenau the path continues through Löwenhain, Geising and Altenberg to Zinnwald. Passing the old border crossing on the B 170 it runs through Prední Cínovec (Vorderzinnwald) before returning to Krupka. On the way, the educational trail cuts through the source region of the White Müglitz river.

== See also ==
- List of mines in Germany
