= Karsdorf Fault =

Striking tectonic fracture line

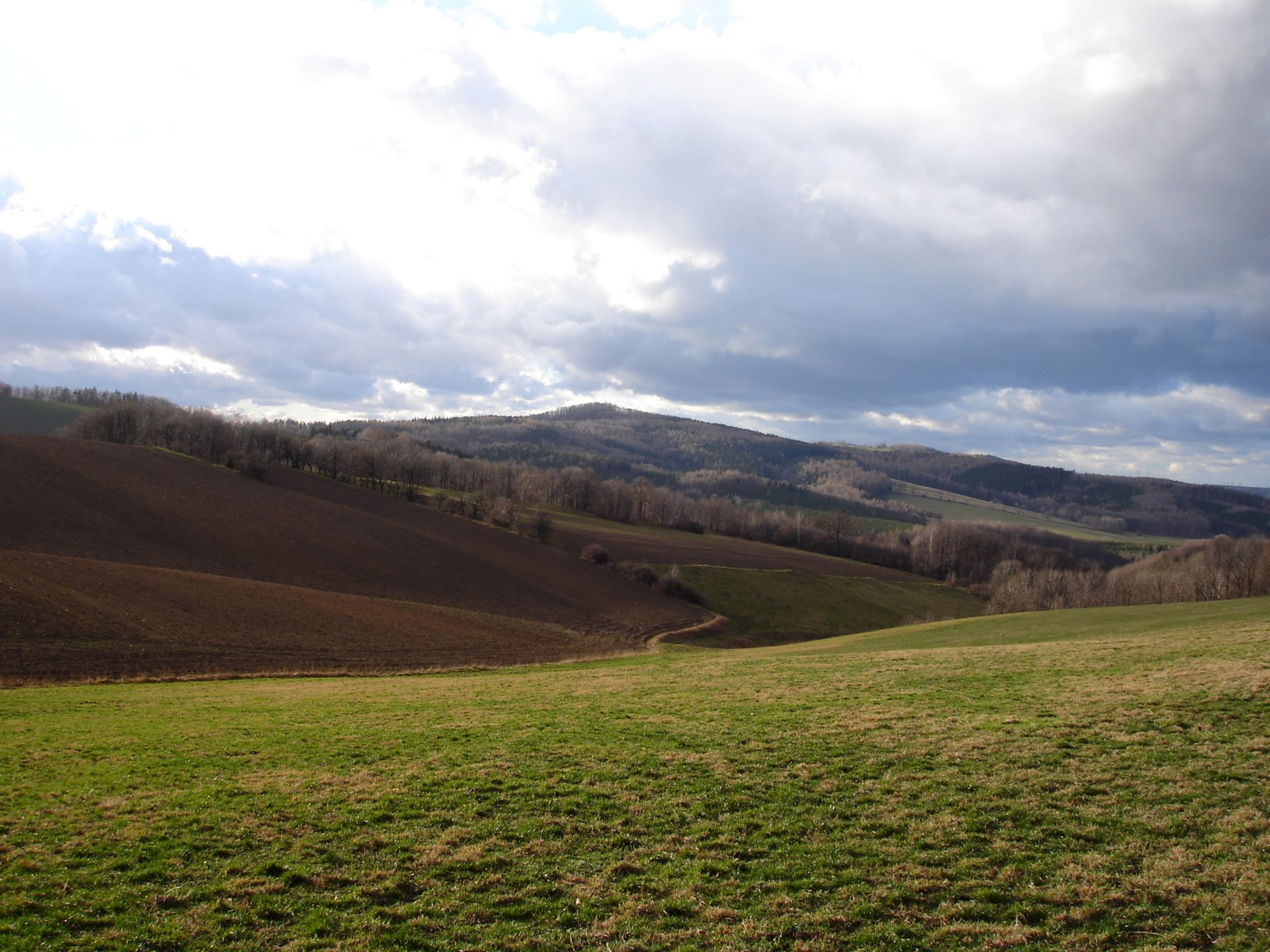
The Wilisch hill seen from the Finckenfang

The Karsdorf Fault (German: Karsdorfer Störung or Karsdorfer Verwerfung) is a striking tectonic fracture line, which is part of the Central Saxon Fault, and is located in the eastern Ore Mountains and the Elbe Valley Slate Mountains of Germany. It forms the northern geological boundary of the Eastern Ore Mountains in the district of Sächsische Schweiz-Osterzgebirge with the Elbe zone, where it is adjoined by the Döhlen Basin and the Kreischa Basin.

It derives its name from the town of Karsdorf near Rabenau, formerly also known as Wendisch-Carsdorf. As a result, the fault line is also called the Wendisch-Carsdorf Fault Line (Wendisch-Carsdorfer Verwerfungslinie) in historical literature.

Near Karsdorf the fault line runs in a southeasterly direction where it is geomorphologically outlined by the following clearly visible features:

- Windberg near Freital, 352 m above NN.
- Lerchenberg near Possendorf, 425 m
- Quohrener Kipse, 452 m
- Hermsdorfer Berg, 447 m
- Wilisch, 476 m
- Finckenfang near Maxen, 394 m
- Lerchenhügel near Hausdorf, 413 m
- Lederberg near Schlottwitz, 446 m

South of the fracture line is an almost level wooded area with remnants of sandstone – the Dippoldiswald and Hirschbach Heaths – which are drained by the Oelsabach, Hirschbach and Lockwitzbach. These woodland areas are part of the Cretaceous Elbe Sandstone and are regionally important for their water supply. The oldest sections of these relicts belong to the earliest Cretaceous deposits (Niederschöna Formation) in the Dresden region. They are separated from the main Elbe Valley chalk region by the Karsdorf Fault.
