= Cottaer Spitzberg =

Basalt dome in Germany

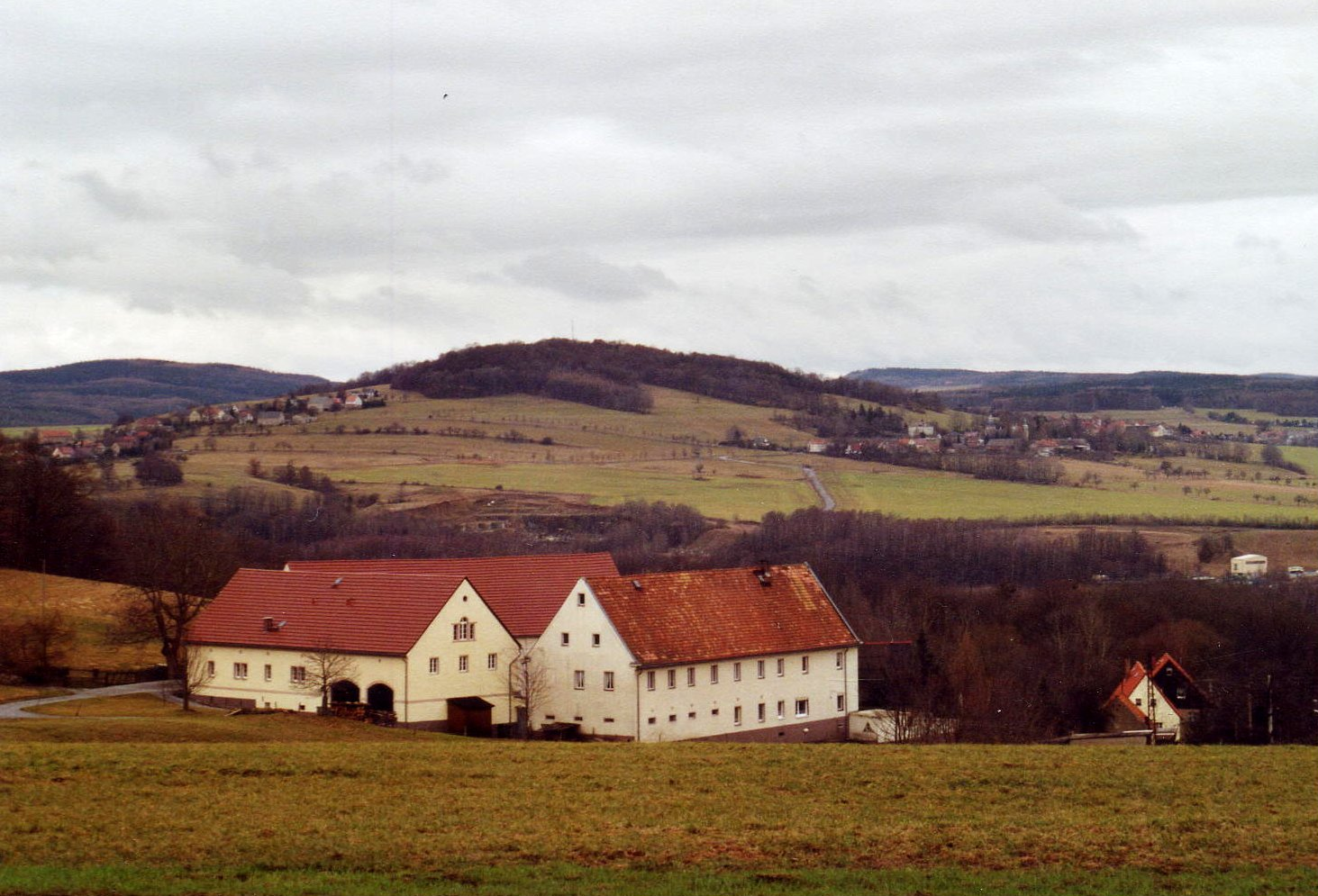
- View of the Cottaer Spitzberg from the northeast

Highest point
- Elevation: 390.8 m above sea level (HN) (1,282 ft)
- Coordinates: 50°53′56″N 13°58′12″E

Geography
- Location within Saxony
- Location: Freistaat Sachsen, Germany
- Parent range: Saxon Switzerland

Geology
- Mountain type: Cone mountain
- Rock type: Trachyte-basalt

The Cottaer Spitzberg is a 390.8 m high basalt dome on the western edge of Saxon Switzerland. Since 1979 the hill has been a protected area due to its geological and botanical features.

== Location and area ==
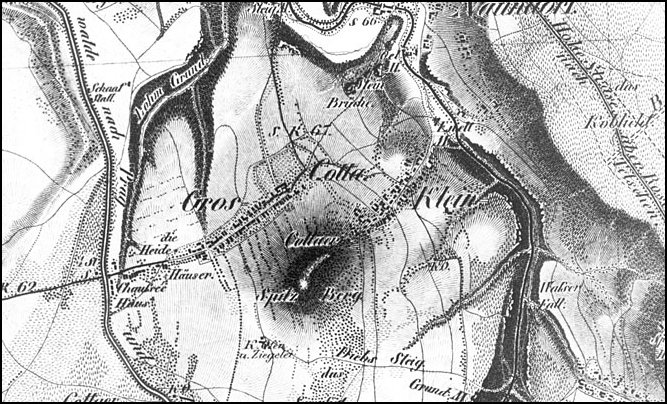
Cotta and the Cottaer Spitzberg on an 1812 map of Oberreitschen

The hill, which was once also known Cottaer Spitze, is located on the plateau between the valleys of the Gottleuba to the east and the Bahre to the west. It rises above the village of Cotta at its northern foot as well as the local area by at least 70 metres and forms a clear landmark in the countryside.

== Geology ==
The Cottaer Spitzberg was formed as a result of the Tertiary breakthrough of basalt through the Cretaceous sandstone sediments of the Elbe Sandstone Mountains. In geological region that is composed largely of sandstone, granite and gneiss the hill is very much a geological exception.

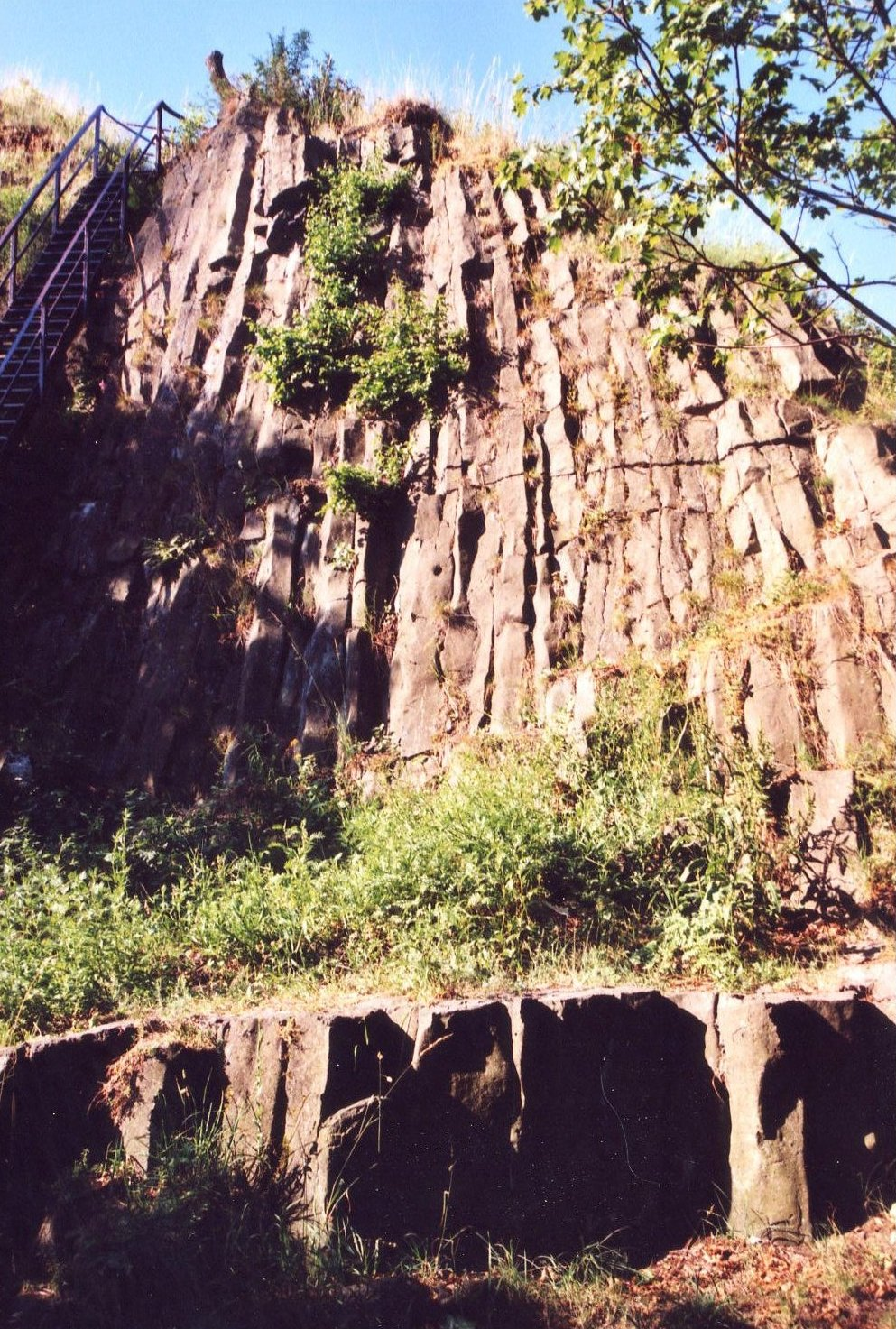
Basalt cone at the summit

The hill is one of a line of volcanic inselbergs of which the Stolpener Burgberg, the Wilisch and the Geising are the best-known. On the rocky summit of the Spitzberg, the grey and black columns of the trachyte basalt are exposed. They are each around 30 centimetres thick, rising almost vertically and were intensively quarried in the 19th century by a quarry company. Only a remnant of the summit remains, because a triangulation column of the central European meridian arc and Saxon State Survey Office had been erected on it in 1865.

== Botanical features ==
The Cottaer Spitzberg is also a significant area for botany, although the quarry has reduced the variety of local plants. Species like the Sword-leaved Helleborine, the Large Pink or the Bristly Bellflower are amongst the species that used to grow here but no longer occur. In spite of that the Spitzberg continues to be a botanically interesting habitat. On the northern side there is an oak and hornbeam wood (including Small-leaved Lime, Norway Maple, Sycamore Maple and Ash) interspersed with species like the lungworts. In addition the sun-exposed hill is also home to several warmth-loving plants like the Crown Vetch and the Hoary Cinquefoil.

== History ==
At the beginning of the 1960s in the heyday of the Cold War a small bunker system was built on the eastern side of the hill. This was intended to be the emergency command post for the district of Pirna in the event of a nuclear attack on Dresden. On the western side facing Dresden an observation post was erected.

== Views ==
The Cottaer Spitzberg has long been a popular destination because, on the top of the treeless basalt summit, there is a panoramic all-round view, only restricted closer in. In clear conditions the views extend as far as:

- North: over Pirna to the Lusatian Highlands,
- Northwest: over the Dresden Basin,
- West and south: over the Elbe Valley Slate Mountains to the crest of the Eastern Ore Mountains,
- East: over the Gottleuba valley to the table mountains of Saxon Switzerland and the volcanic cone of the Central Bohemian Uplands.
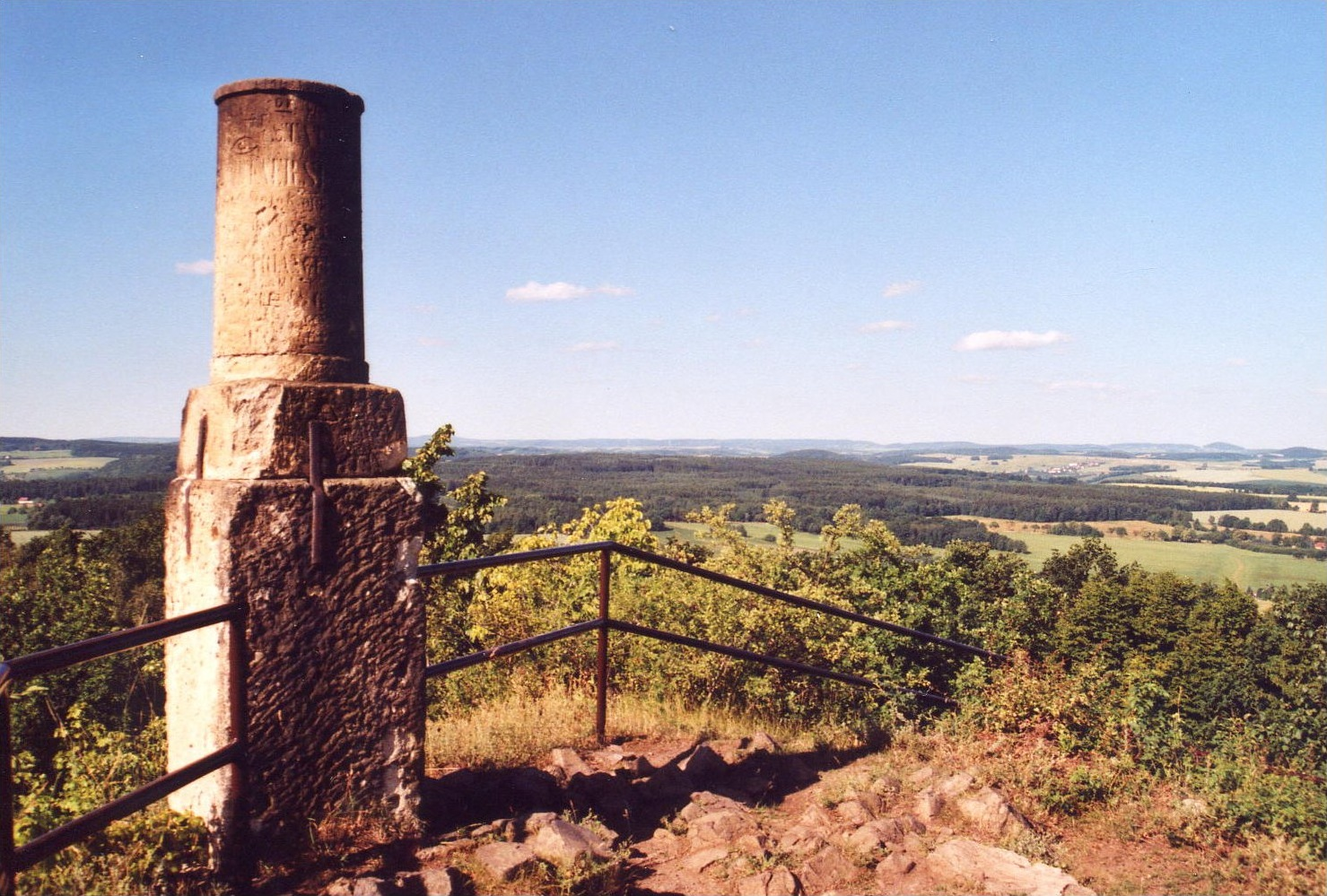
View southwards (Crest of the Eastern Ore Mountains)

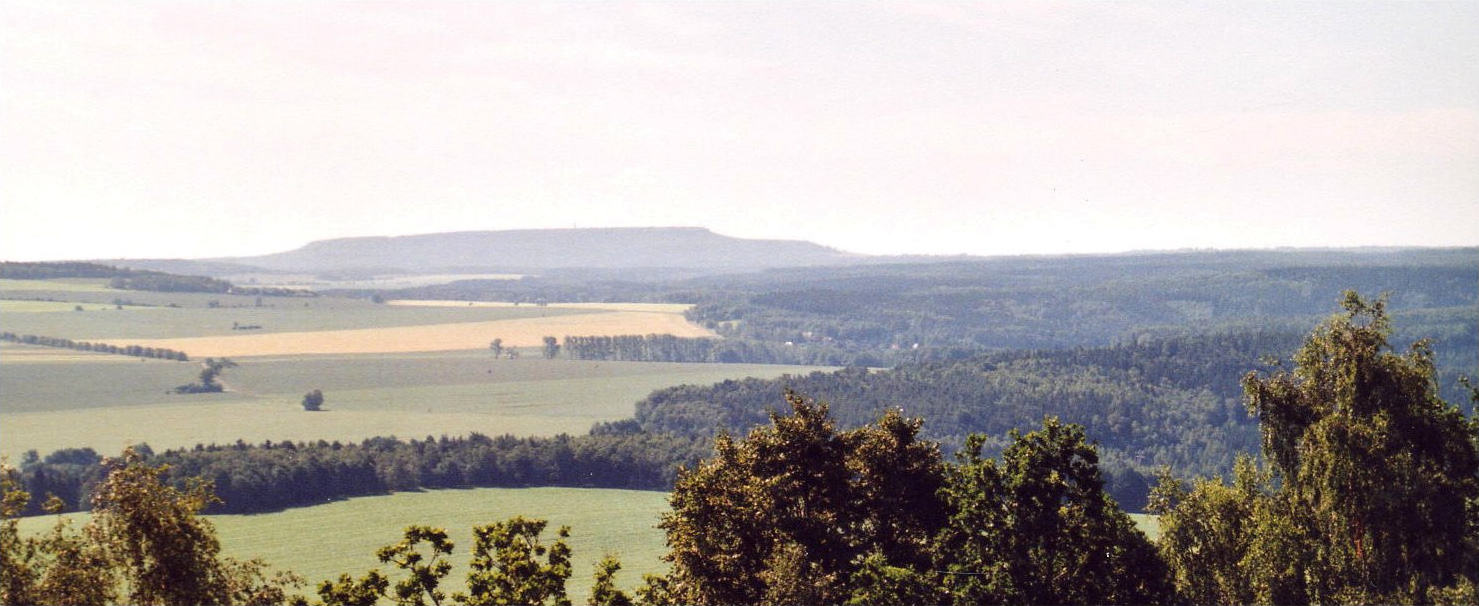
View southeast (Hoher Schneeberg)

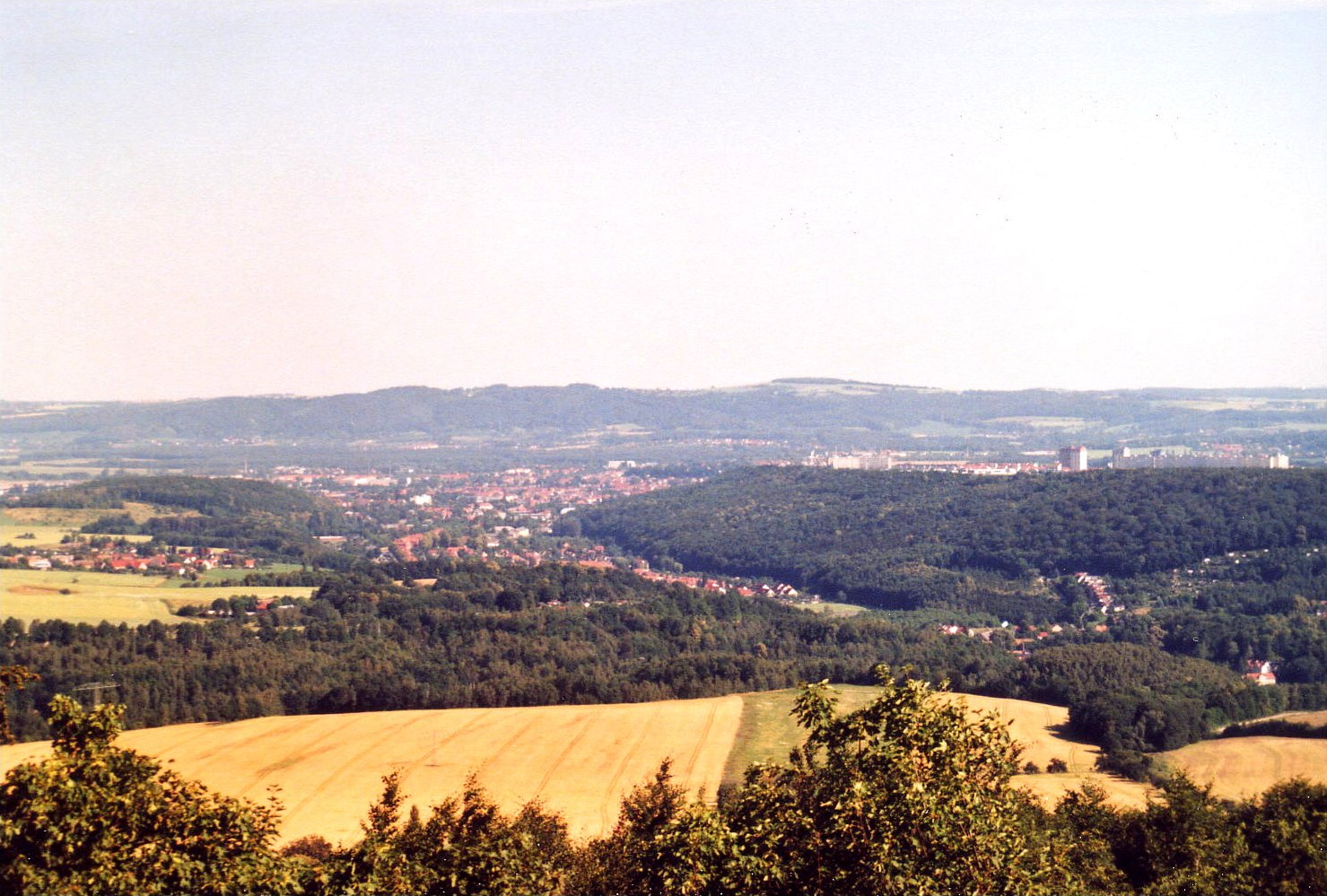
View north (Pirna and Elbe Valley)

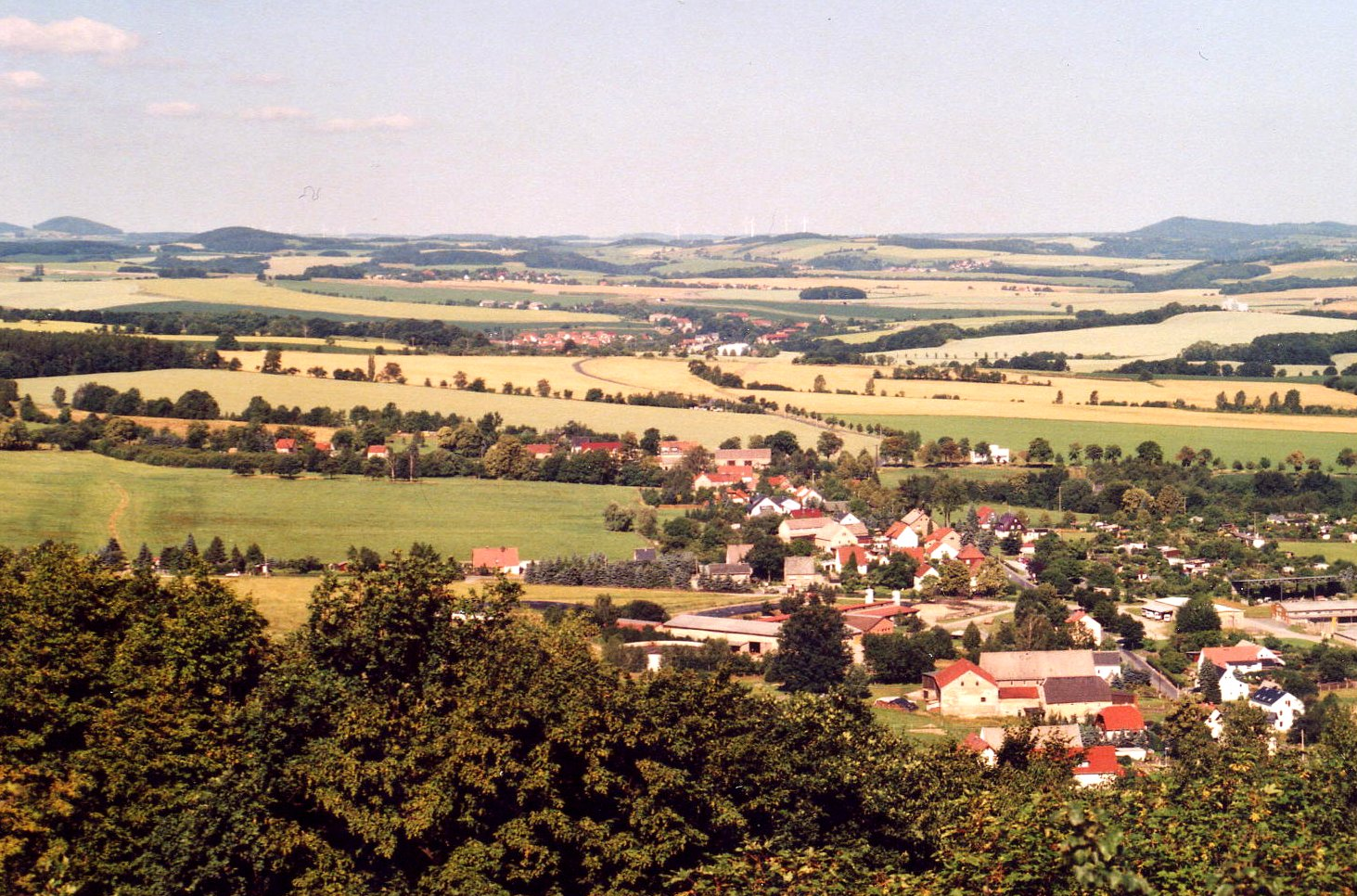
View west (Cotta and foothills of the Eastern Ore Mountains)

== Sources ==
- Pirna und seine Umgebung. Edition no. 1 Akademie-Verlag Berlin, Berlin 1966 (Werte der deutschen Heimat. Vol. 9).
- Peter Rölke (publ.): Am Rande der Sächsischen Schweiz. Reihe Wander- & Naturführer Sächsische Schweiz Vol. 3, Dresden, 2004.
