= Werte der deutschen Heimat =

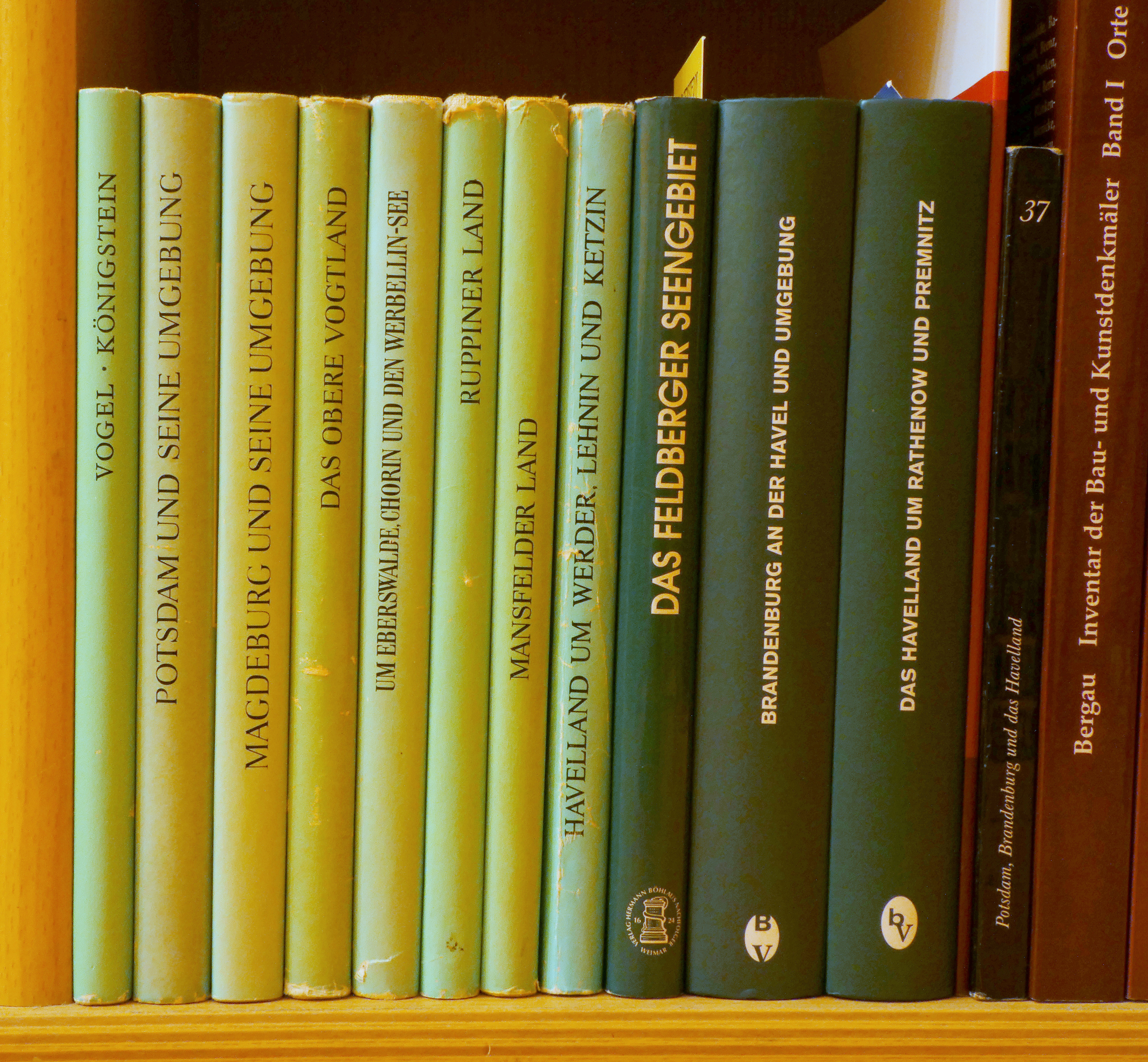
Spines of different books of the serie Werte der deutschen Heimat (light and dark green)

Werte der deutschen Heimat (literally "Values of the German Homeland") originally Werte der Deutschen Heimat and, between 1970 and 1990 called Werte unserer Heimat, was a series of publications by former East German Academy of Sciences at Berlin, that was published by Akademie-Verlag Berlin and included more than 50 volumes. The work was undertaken by the Academy’s Local History Working Group within the Institute for Geography and Geo-ecology.

The aim of this series was to produce a comprehensive inventory of local history works in East Germany. From 1992 the series continued to be published under its original title of Werte der deutschen Heimat by the Leibniz Institut für Länderkunde (IfL) and, from 1993, by the Verlag Böhlau Nachf. Weimar. In 1994 it was given a new layout and, since 2001, has been continued as Landschaften in Deutschland - Werte der deutschen Heimat. Since Volume 62 the series has been jointly published by the IfL and the Saxon Academy of Sciences at Leipzig (SAW). Since 2001 it has been published by Böhlau Verlag (Cologne, Weimar, Vienna).

== Volumes ==
- Volume 1: Gebiet Königstein, Sächsische Schweiz, 1957
- Volume 2: Zwischen Sebnitz, Hinterhermsdorf und den Zschirnsteinen, 1959
- Volume 3: Im Süden der Barbarine, 1960
- Volume 4: Um Bad Gottleuba, Berggiesshübel und Liebstadt, 1961
- Volume 5: Das Limbacher Land, 1962
- Volume 6: Das Gleichberggebiet, 1963
- Volume 7: Um Altenberg, Geising und Lauenstein, 1964
- Volume 8: Zwischen Müglitz und Weißeritz, 1964
- Volume 9: Pirna und seine Umgebung, 1966
- Volume 10: Östliches Erzgebirge, 1966
- Volume 11: Die Bergbaulandschaft von Schneeberg und Eibenstock, 1967
- Volume 12: Um Bautzen und Schirgiswalde, 1967
- Volume 13: Von Annaberg bis Oberwiesenthal, 1968
- Volume 14: Greifswald und seine Umgebung, 1968
- Volume 15: Potsdam und seine Umgebung, 1969
- Volume 16: Die südöstliche Oberlausitz mit Zittau und dem Zittauer Gebirge, 1970
- Volume 17: Um Stolpen und Neustadt, 1970
- Volume 18: Weimar und seine Umgebung, 1973
- Volume 19: Magdeburg und seine Umgebung, 1973
- Volume 20: Um Aue, Schwarzenberg und Johanngeorgenstadt, 1972
- Volume 21: Zwischen Tharandter Wald, Freital und dem Lockwitztal, 1973
- Volume 22: Lössnitz und Moritzburger Teichlandschaft, 1973
- Volume 23: Das Altenburger Land, 1973, 2. bearb. Aufl. 1974
- Volume 24: Zwischen Strohmberg, Czorneboh und Kottmar, 1974
- Volume 25: Das Rheinsberg-Fürstenberger Seengebiet, 1974
- Volume 26: Das Obere Vogtland, 1976
- Volume 27: Dresdner Heide, Pillnitz, Radeberger Land, 1976
- Volume 28: Das mittlere Zschopaugebiet, 1977
- Volume 29: Der Kyffhäuser und seine Umgebung, 1976
- Volume 30: Um Oschatz und Riesa, 1977
- Volume 31: Zwischen Zwickauer Mulde und Geyerschem Wald, 1980
- Volume 32: Elbtal und Lößhügelland bei Meißen, 1979
- Volume 33: Karl-Marx-Stadt, 1979
- Volume 34: Um Eberswalde, Chorin und den Werbellin-See, 1981
- Volume 35: Zwischen Mülsengrund, Stollberg und Zwönitztal, 1981
- Volume 36: Burger und Lübbenauer Spreewald, 1981
- Volume 37: Ruppiner Land, 1981
- Volume 38: Mansfelder Land, 1982
- Volume 39: Zwischen Rennsteig und Sonneberg, 1986
- Volume 40: Lausitzer Bergland um Pulsnitz und Bischofswerda, 1983
- Volume 41: Zwischen Wolkenstein, Marienberg und Jöhstadt, 1985
- Volume 42: Dresden, 1984
- Volume 43: Um Olbernhau und Seiffen, 1985
- Volume 44: Plauen und das mittlere Vogtland, 1986
- Volume 45: Eisenhüttenstadt und seine Umgebung, 1986
- Volume 46: Das Gebiet an der unteren Unstrut, 1988
- Volume 47: Freiberger Land, 1988
- Volume 48: Zwischen Ruhla, Bad Liebenstein und Schmalkalden, 1989
- Volume 49/50: Berlin, 1987
- Volume 51: Westliche Oberlausitz zwischen Kamenz und Königswartha, 1990
- Volume 52: Dessau-Wörlitzer Kulturlandschaft, 1992
- Volume 53: Havelland um Werder, Lehnin und Ketzin, 1992
- Volume 54: Görlitz und seine Umgebung, 1994
- Volume 55: Burger und Lübbenauer Spreewald, 1994
- Volume 56: Zwischen Löbau und Herrnhut, 1996
- Volume 57: Das Feldberger Seengebiet, 1997
- Volume 58: Rudolstadt und das mittlere Saaletal, 1998
- Volume 59: Das östliche Vogtland, 1998
- Volume 60: Das Müritzgebiet, 1999
- Volume 61: Weimar und seine Umgebung, 1999
- Volume 62: Saalfeld und das Thüringer Schiefergebirge, 2001, ISBN 3-412-10800-6
- Volume 63: Der Schraden, 2001, ISBN 3-412-10900-2
- Volume 64: Um Eberswalde, Chorin und Werbellinsee, 2002, ISBN 3-412-02401-5
- Volume 65: Das Mittelrheinische Becken, 2003, ISBN 3-412-10102-8
- Volume 66: Bitterfeld und das untere Muldetal, 2004, ISBN 3-412-03803-2
- Volume 67: Oberlausitzer Heide- und Teichlandschaft, 2005, ISBN 3-412-08903-6
- Volume 68: Das nördliche Vogtland um Greiz, 2006, ISBN 3-412-09003-4
- Volume 69: Brandenburg an der Havel und Umgebung, 2006, ISBN 3-412-09103-0
- Volume 70: Großenhainer Pflege, 2008, ISBN 978-3-412-09706-6
- Volume 71: Fischland, Darß, Zingst und Barth mit Umland, 2010, ISBN 3-412-09806-X
- Volume 72: Eiderstedt, 2010, ISBN 3-412-09906-6 (in preparation)
