= Georgenfelder Hochmoor =

German raised bog

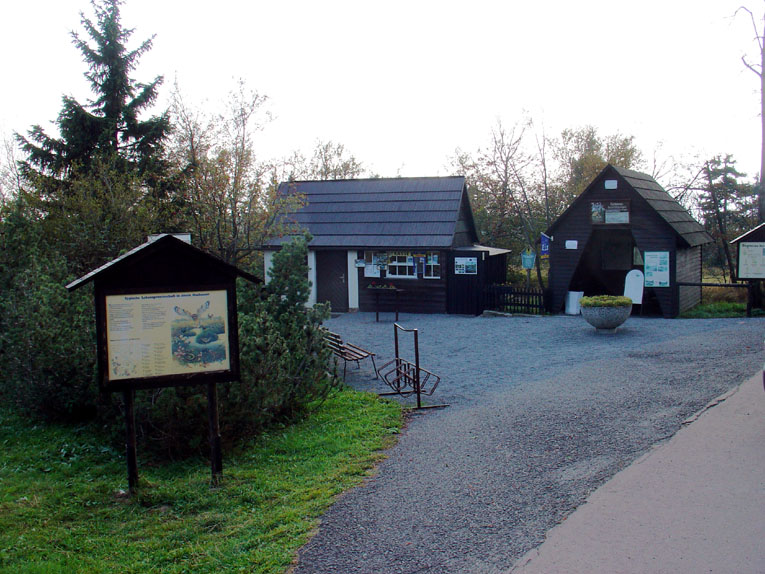
Entrance to the reserve

The Georgenfelder Hochmoor is a raised bog (Hochmoor) in the German Ore Mountains of central Europe, not far from Zinnwald-Georgenfeld. It is part of a larger bog or moor complex, that lies to the south, mainly on the far side of the Germany's national border in the Czech Republic and which, since time immemorial, has been known simply as "The Lake" (Die See). The Georgenfelder Hochmoor is one of the oldest nature reserves in Saxony.

== Geography ==
=== Location ===
Zinnwald-Georgenfeld, which lies right on the German-Czech border, is about 45 kilometres south of Dresden and four kilometres south of Altenberg. This dispersed settlement, on the plateau at the crest of the eastern Ore Mountains, lies at an elevation of 780 to 880 metres above sea level (NN) and is the highest village in the eastern Ore Mountains. The Georgenfelder Hochmoor is part of this municipality.

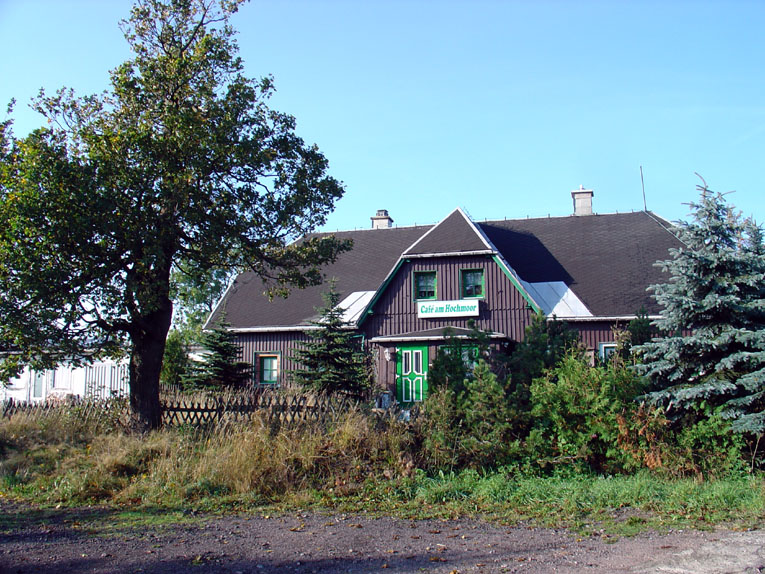
Former café on the hochmoor

=== Creation ===
The formation of the raised bog goes back to the Elster glaciation. The maximum extent of the inland ice mass at that time reached as far as the so-called flint line (Feuersteinlinie), which, in the district of Sächsische Schweiz-Osterzgebirge runs roughly along the line Tharandt – Rabenau – Freital – Kreischa – Weesenstein – Cottaer Spitzberg.

The ridgeline in this area had a permanent covering or cap of firn. When this firn cap melted, it formed small lakes in the hollows which had no drainage. In the warm period that followed the glacial period, vegetation grew on the shores of these waters. Reeds and horsetails produced the first humus and initiated the formation of peat. Meanwhile, falling deciduous leaves, pollen and grass collected in the waters. The pollen trapped in the fen still enables today, after thousands of years, an accurate determination of the then prevailing vegetation and the climate.

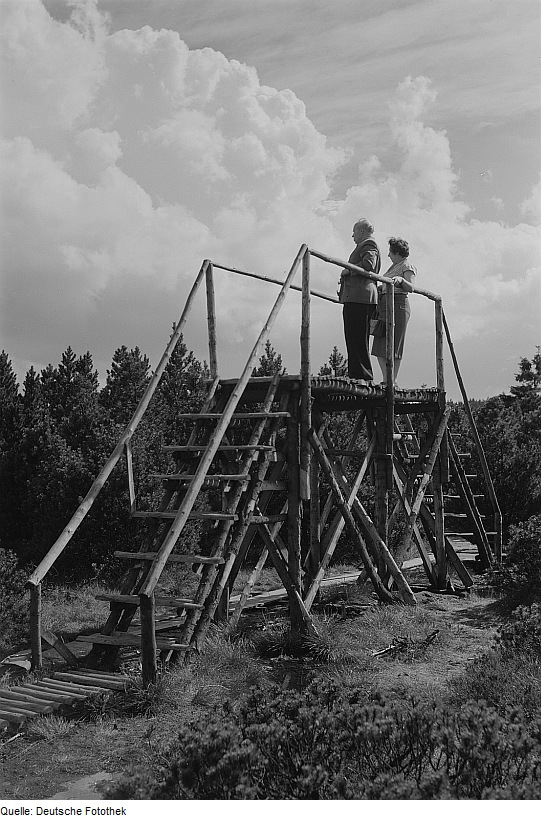
Georgenfelder Hochmoor

The dry and warm climate period that followed allowed this reed bog to dry out. Individual trees, especially birch, colonised these nutrient-rich areas. After this period followed a cool and wet period with low levels of sunshine. The enormous rainfall raised water levels immensely, which is why peat moss species colonised very quickly and, due to their rapid growth, threatened and eventually entirely displaced the trees. Dead trees were covered in an airtight fashion by the moss. This layer is also referred to today as old forest peat (Waldtorf). The peat moss died underneath but continued to grow upwards indefinitely. This formed a thick layer of peat. The surface of this vegetation is strongly curved towards the centre, which is why it is called a raised bog. The geographic elevation of the bog has thus nothing to do with the term "raised bog", because they also occur in the lowlands.

The subsequent moderately dry climatic period triggered off a new tree growth in the area and bog pines colonised the terrain. The peat mosses formed the older moss peat (Moostorf). Subsequently, the climate became cold and wet again, and mosses threatened the woodland cover. These dead trees are now referred to as the younger layer of forest peat.

In our current moderately dry climate, bog pine is taking hold again.

On the bare plateaux of the Ore Mountain ridgeline several bogs have formed over the course of time. These are usually also watersheds.

Another bog region in the immediate vicinity is the Fürstenau Heath Nature Reserve.

=== Climate ===
Zinnwald-Georgenfeld has a humid continental climate (Köppen climate classification).

Climate data for Zinnwald-Georgenfeld: 877m (1991−2020)
Month	Jan	Feb	Mar	Apr	May	Jun	Jul	Aug	Sep	Oct	Nov	Dec	Year
Mean daily maximum °C (°F)	−1.1 (30.0)	−0.4 (31.3)	3.1 (37.6)	9.2 (48.6)	13.6 (56.5)	16.8 (62.2)	19.0 (66.2)	18.9 (66.0)	13.9 (57.0)	8.5 (47.3)	3.0 (37.4)	−0.3 (31.5)	8.6 (47.5)
Daily mean °C (°F)	−3.3 (26.1)	−2.8 (27.0)	0.2 (32.4)	5.3 (41.5)	9.6 (49.3)	12.8 (55.0)	14.9 (58.8)	14.8 (58.6)	10.4 (50.7)	5.6 (42.1)	0.9 (33.6)	−2.5 (27.5)	5.4 (41.7)
Mean daily minimum °C (°F)	−5.6 (21.9)	−5.2 (22.6)	−2.5 (27.5)	1.7 (35.1)	5.7 (42.3)	9.0 (48.2)	11.2 (52.2)	11.1 (52.0)	7.3 (45.1)	3.1 (37.6)	−1.1 (30.0)	−4.5 (23.9)	2.5 (36.5)
Average precipitation mm (inches)	87.6 (3.45)	65.4 (2.57)	76.9 (3.03)	54.3 (2.14)	84.1 (3.31)	99.5 (3.92)	107.3 (4.22)	113.8 (4.48)	82.3 (3.24)	79.8 (3.14)	77.4 (3.05)	83.7 (3.30)	1,012.1 (39.85)
Average precipitation days (≥ 0.1mm)	20.3	16.7	18.3	13.9	15.9	16.0	16.3	15.1	14.3	16.8	17.5	20.3	201.0
Average snowy days (≥ 1 cm)	28.5	25.4	23.6	7.5	0.4	0	0	0	0	2.6	11.4	25.1	127.3
Source: NOAA

== Age and profile ==
Half mature moss peat forms a layer about 8 cm thick over 100 years. Mature moss peat forms a layer of 2 to 3 centimetres in the same time. The Georgenfelder Hochmoor has a thickness of about 5 meters and is thus about 10,000 years old.

== Extent ==
The nature reserve covers about 11 hectares and is located at an elevation of 875 metres above sea level (NN). It is only the small western tip of an extensive region of bog between the mountains known as the German and Czech Lugsteins.

== Conservation and research ==
On the initiative of the State Association for Saxon Conservation (Landesverein Sächsischer Heimatschutz), the region was purchased in 1926 and declared a nature reserve. A school headmaster, Marschner, was especially prominent in the purchase and the botanical research of the reserve. The Saxon botanist, Court Councillor (Hofrat) A. Naumann, associate Professor of Botany at the Dresden Veterinary College also undertook extensive research of the Georgenfelder Hochmoor.

== Access ==
The bog was made accessible on foot by the construction of a board walk.

== Present vegetation ==
Due to intensive peat cutting, the water balance of the area was disturbed, resulting in the death of some plant species. Today, cranberry and bog bilberry from the North European tundra still colonise the bog. The predominant species, however, is bog pine, but some silver birch and spruce trees have also established themselves. The bog pine stems from the mountain pine of the high mountains. In the Georgenfelder Hochmoor it is usually found as a knee-high shrub, a mountain pine or a crooked pine. These forms of growth are perfectly adapted to the harsh climate of this mountain range. Blueberries, heathers and cranberries can be found on the dry terrain. The sheath cottongrass, by contrast, has colonized the wet spots.

The following plants may also be found in the reserve: sedges, peat moss, cottongrass, sundew and butterwort.

=== Protected plants ===
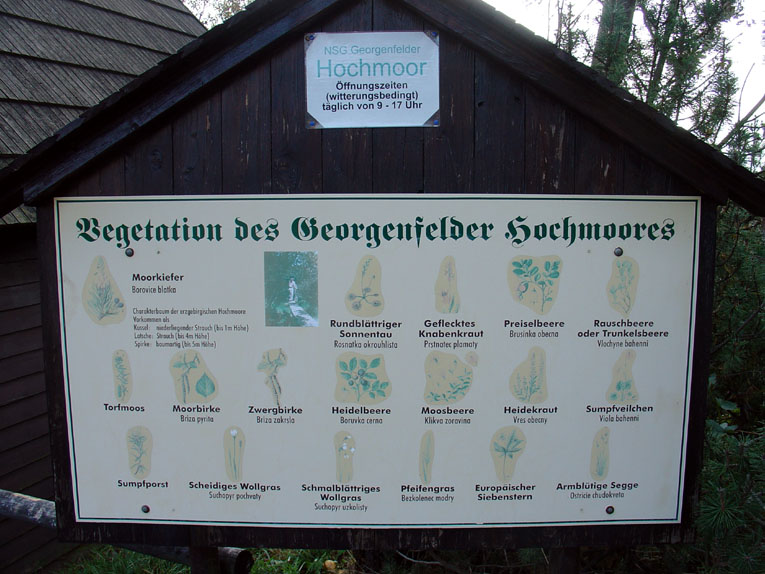
Information board about the vegetation in the bog region

- Longleaf pine (Pinus palustris)
- Downy birch (Betula pubescens)
- Dwarf birch (Betula nana)
- Peat moss (Sphagnidae)
- Bilberry (Vaccinium)
- Wild rosemary (Rhododendron tomentosum)
- Sheathed cottonsedge (Eriophorum vaginatum)
- Common cottongrass (Eriophorum angustifolium)
- Round-leaved sundew (Drosera rotundifolia)
- Moorland spotted orchid (Dactylorhiza maculata)
- Cowberry (Vaccinium vitis-idaea)
- Bog bilberry (Vaccinium uliginosum)
- Cranberry
- Heather
- Marsh violet, (Viola palustris)
- Moor grass (Molinia)
- Arctic starflower (Trientalis europaea)
- Few-flowered sedge (Carex pauciflora)

== Literature ==
- A. Naumann: Aus der Geschichte unserer Moore. In: Mitteilungen des Landesvereins Sächsischer Heimatschutz. Heft 1/2, 1927
- Karl Tröger: Schutz unserem Georgenfelder Hochmoor. Kreiskommision Natur- und Heimatfreunde im Deutschen Kulturbund, Kreis Dippoldiswalde

50°43′47.08″N 13°44′46.60″E
