= Döhlen Basin =

Coordinates: 51°00′07″N 13°38′53″E

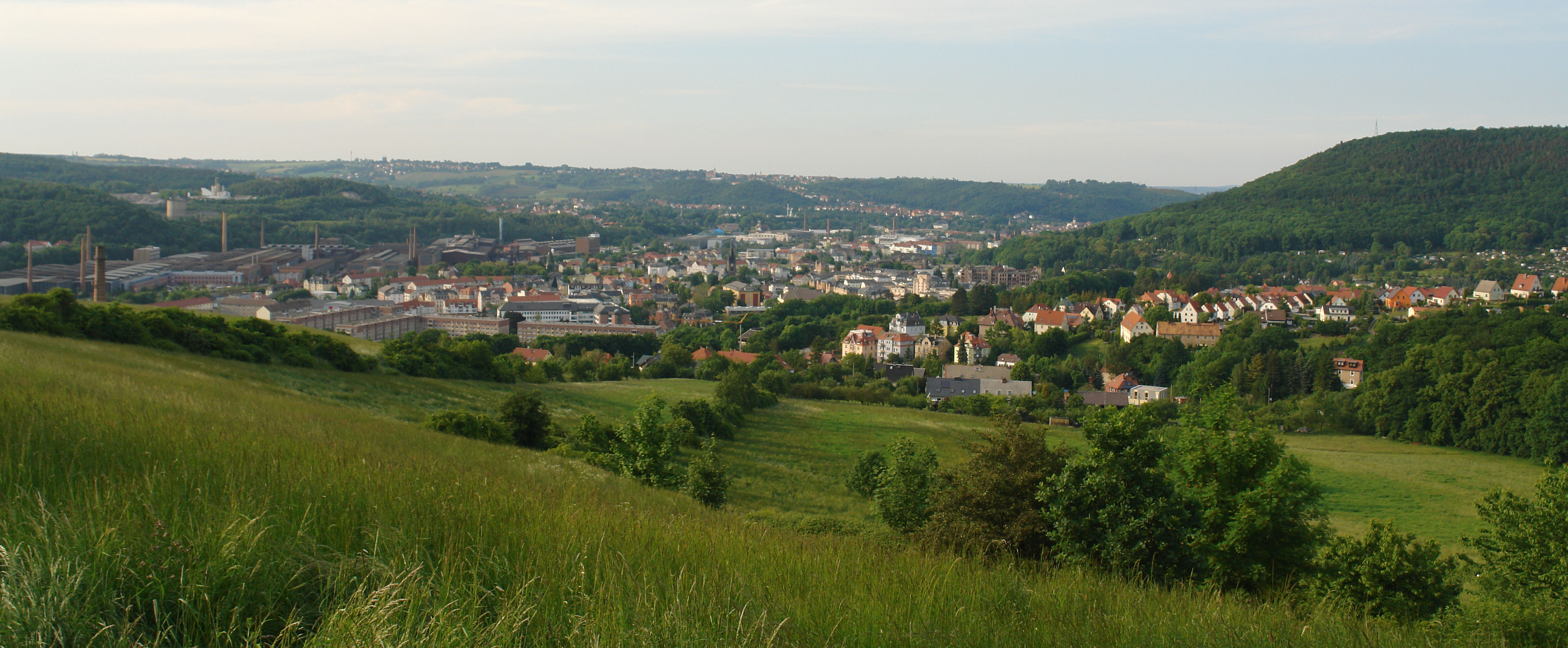
View of Freital in the Döhlen Basin. Right: the Windberg hill

The Döhlen Basin (German: Döhlener Becken) is a landscape unit in the German federal state of Saxony, southwest of Dresden. The Döhlen Basin has a length of 22 km and a width of 6 km and lies within the district of Sächsische Schweiz-Osterzgebirge.

== Description ==
In the centre of the basin is the large county town of Freital; although the basin is named after Döhlen, one of the villages in its borough. The highest point in the area is the Lerchenberg near Possendorf at 425 m above sea level (NN); the lowest point is in the river valley of the Weißeritz at 160 m above NN. The Karsdorf fault forms the geological boundary with the Eastern Ore Mountains to the south.

The formation and sedimentation of the basin lasted from Upper Carboniferous to the Lower Permian and were tectonically affected by the adjacent NW-SE trending fault zone (the Elbe Valley zone). About half of the 800-metre-thick basin filling is made of pyroclastic rock. Of economic importance were the coal seams of the Döhlen formation, whose occurrence has been known since the 16th century and particularly in the late 19th and early 20th century was the reason for an intensive mining industry. From 1968, mining activity became restricted to the extraction of uranium-bearing coal on the northwest edge of the Döhlen Basin by SDAG Wismut. Since 1989, the surface and underground facilities in the region have been safeguarded and sanitised.

== See also ==
- Coalfield
