= Müglitz =

Müglitz may refer to:

- Müglitz, the German name for Mohelnice, a town in the eastern Czech Republic
- Böhmisch Müglitz, the German name for Mohelnice, a former village in the northwestern Czech Republic
- Müglitz (Altenberg), a village in the municipality Altenberg, Saxony, Germany
- Müglitz (river), a river in Saxony, Germany
