= Dohna Feud =

Historical dispute

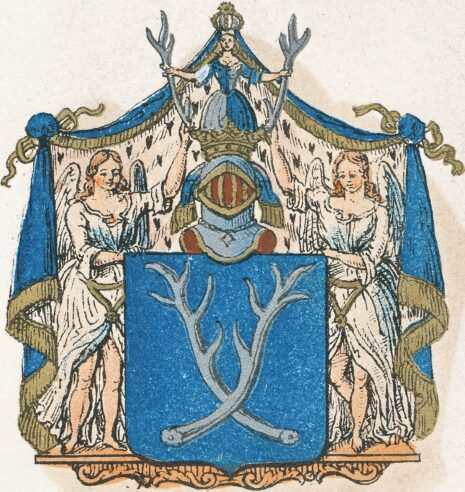
Coat of arms of the counts of Dohna

The Dohna Feud (German: Dohnaische Fehde) was a 14th-century dispute between the Burgraves of Dohna, who resided in the Eastern Ore Mountains of Central Europe, on the one hand and Saxon nobleman, John of Körbitz (Hans von Körbitz) and William I, Margrave of Meissen, on the other. The feud lasted from 1385 to 1402.

== Course ==
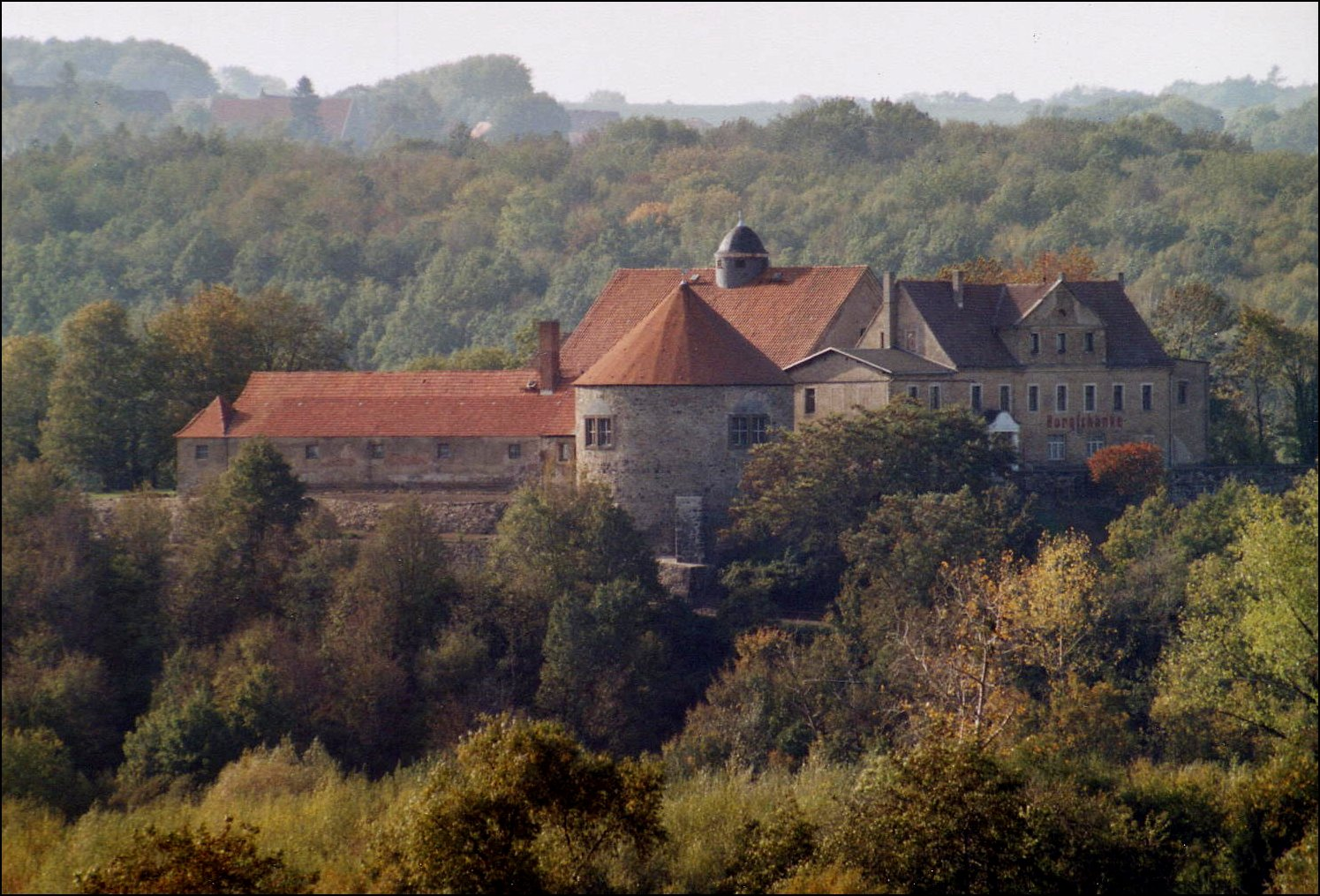
Dohna Castle (with 19th and 20th century buildings)

The confrontation began in 1385 at a ball for the nobility in Dresden, when a personal dispute between John of Körbitz (Hans von Körbitz) and a young burgrave, Jeschke. After Jeschke had blatantly flirted with Körbitz's wife, the latter tripped him up, whereupon the gentleman from Dohna responded with a slap in the face. Nickel described this incident as follows in 1482: "The initial disagreement had a beginning: it was one of the Korbs, who tripped the young Jeschke in the ballroom at Dresden; whereupon Yoshko hit Korb in the mouth."

The feud that started in this way, led John of Körbitz to lay siege to Jeschke's father, the old burggrave, Otto Heyde II, and his brother, Otto Heyde III. Jeschke himself was able to escape capture. While his brother was rescued from captivity (as witnessed by the sale of Seifersdorf in 1387), his father died a prisoner.

The private war between the Donins and the Körbitzes had wider repercussions. The robber baron activities of the Donins hindered trade between Saxony and Bohemia, and became a thorn in the flesh for Markgrave William I. However, the margrave saw the feud as a possibility for eliminating the burgraves of Dohna as competitors in the dispute over power and influence in the Saxon-Bohemian border area. He had already forced the burgraves of Leisnig to sell their estates to him in 1365 and the Colditzes to do likewise with their barony in 1404. Added to this was that William I was in a stronger position after the settlement of the Bohemian border disputes in 1391. At that time, the Margrave's relationship with the Donins still seemed intact. Burgrave Jeschke witnessed the conclusion of the border agreement, and his brother, Otto Mul, had also testified a year later. But loyalties changed very frequently at this time.

William took advantage of the personal dispute between John of Körbitz and Jeschke of Dohna to subdue the imperially immediate castle of the Donins. In 1399, he occupied the burgravial fortification in Rabenau and, in 1401, took over Dippoldiswalde, which also belonged to the Burgraviate of Dohna. In late summer 1401 he began the siege of Dohna Castle. This lasted almost a year. On 16 June 1402, the Margrave issued a document to the castle. Three days later, the castle fell and a Meissen Vogt entered. Burgrave Jeschke managed to escape to Weesenstein. But he was not tolerated there or in Königstein. In Königstein, which still belonged to Bohemia, he was arrested and beheaded in 1403 in Ofen (Budapest). Whether his children survived is not known. His faithful servant, Jonas Daniel, is supposed to have taken them to relatives at Königsbrück. However, he was attacked and killed on the Königsbrück Road (Moritzburger Weg). At least this is believed to be the reason for the stone cross with the inscription "FINIS MILTIS IHONAS DANIEL" ("the end of the soldier Jonas Daniel"). Probably the only survivor was Jeschke's brother, Otto Heyde III, who died in Prague in 1415.

== Consequences ==
The Donins lost all their territories in the Ore Mountains in 1402, which were given to the Saxon nobles as fiefs. Their relatives went to Bohemia under the protection of Emperor Sigismund, who, however, had no means of helping them to rule in Dohna due to the Hussite revolution.

As a result of the high expenses incurred by Margrave William I, to a considerable extent caused by the conquest of Dohna Castle, the land and the population were heavily burdened. In addition to special tax collections, there was a steady devaluation of Meissen currency that was the inevitable consequence of a considerable reduction in the silver content of the coins produced in the main Wettin mint. It was not until 1412 that Frederick the Warlike succeeded in stabilizing the currency.

== Sources ==
- Kurt Andermann: Adelsfehde zwischen Recht und Unrecht. Das Beispiel der Dohna-Fehde, in: Martina Schattkovsky (ed.): Die Familie von Bünau. Adelsherrschaften in Sachsen und Böhmen vom Mittelalter bis zur Neuzeit. Leipziger Universitätsverlag, Leipzig, 2008 (= Schriften zur Sächsischen Geschichte und Volkskunde, Bd. 27), ISBN 978-3-86583-235-1, pp. 151–166.
- Hubert Ermisch: Die Dohnasche Fehde, in: Neues Archiv für Sächsische Geschichte und Altertumskunde 22 (1901), pp. 225–290.
- Jürgen Helfricht: Wahre Geschichten um Sachsens schönstes Tal. Taucha, 2000. ISBN 3-89772-022-1.
- Christine Klecker: Wie Dohna verlorenging. Museum Schloß Weesenstein, 1991.
- Alfred Meiche: Historisch-topographische Beschreibung der Amtshauptmannschaft Pirna. Dresden, 1927.
