= Dohna =

- Town
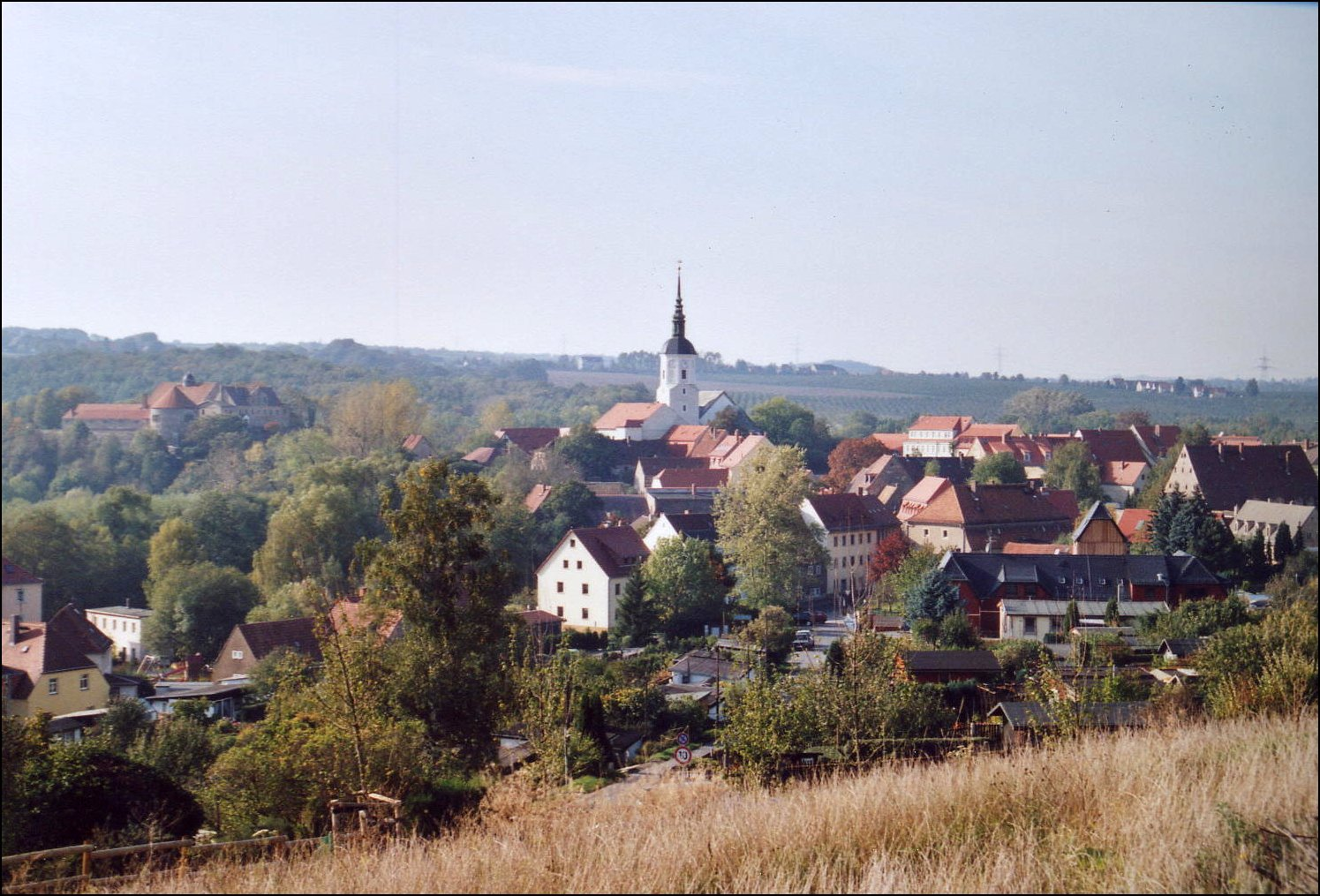
- Dohna

- Coat of arms

- Location of Dohna within Sächsische Schweiz-Osterzgebirge district
- Interactive map of Dohna
- Location within Germany Location within Saxony
- Coordinates: 50°57′17″N 13°51′27″E
- Country: Germany
- State: Saxony
- District: Sächsische Schweiz-Osterzgebirge
- Subdivisions: 12

Government
  - Mayor (2022–29): Ralf Müller (CDU)

Area
  - Total: 28.59 km^{2} (11.04 sq mi)
- Elevation: 130–150 m (430–490 ft)

Population (2025-12-31)
  - Total: 6,029
  - Density: 210.9/km^{2} (546.2/sq mi)
- Time zone: UTC+01:00 (CET)
  - Summer (DST): UTC+02:00 (CEST)
- Postal codes: 01809
- Dialling codes: 03529
- Vehicle registration: PIR
- Website: www.stadt-dohna.de

Dohna (German pronunciation: [ˈdoːna]) is a town in the Sächsische Schweiz-Osterzgebirge district, Saxony, Germany. It is located south of Heidenau, in the Müglitz valley and lies at the northeastern foot of the Eastern Ore Mountains. It is accessed by the Pirna interchange of highway A17, and by the Dohna (Sachs) and Köttewitz stations of the Müglitz Valley Railway.

== History ==
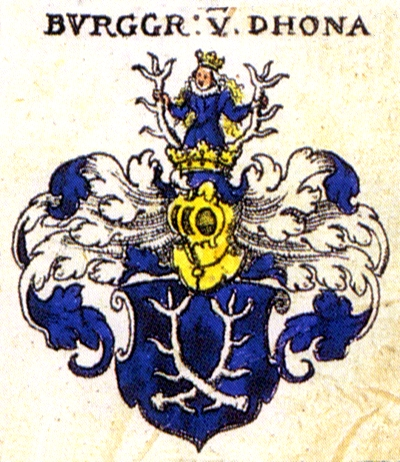
Coat of arms of Burgaves of Dohna

Dohna is one of the oldest towns in Saxony. Traces of settlement dating back to the 16th century BC (Bronze Age) have been found. The Dohna Castle on a strategic hill at the entrance to the Müglitz valley was probably already built in the middle of the 10th century. The town Dohna was first documented as Donin in 1040. The name comes from a construction meaning "property of Doň", from the Bohemian first name Zdoň.

The town and its castle controlled two roads from Saxony to Bohemia: one through the Müglitz valley, and one over the heights to Kulm. The burgraves of Dohna controlled a large territory between the Margraviate of Meissen and the Kingdom of Bohemia, stretching from Rabenau in the west to Gottleuba in the east. The burgraves of Dohna were defeated in 1402 in the Dohna Feud, and the town was given to vassals of the Wettin Margrave of Meissen. After 1460, when the seat of administration moved to Sonnenstein Castle in Pirna, the castle fell into ruins.

In 1587, Fabien I, Burgrave of Dohna, was involved in the French Wars of Religion — commanding Protestant mercenaries which were funded by Elizabeth I of England and the King Frederick II of Denmark and confronting the Catholic forces of King Henry III of France at the Battle of Vimory.

The city of Dohna was devastated by French and Russian troops during the Napoleonic Wars (1813).

The primary and secondary school was opened in 1891. It was named after Marie Curie in 1969. In 1994, Köttewitz and Krebs joined Dohna. In 1999, Meusegast and Röhrsdorf joined Dohna. In January 2000, Dohna became the seat of Verwaltungsgemeinschaft Dohna-Müglitztal, which also includes the municipality Müglitztal.

== Municipality subdivisions ==
- Borthen
- Bosewitz
- Burgstädtel
- Dohna
- Gamig
- Gorknitz
- Köttewitz
- Krebs
- Meusegast
- Röhrsdorf
- Sürßen
- Tronitz

== Main sights ==
- Dohna Castle ruins, and a tower constructed in the 19th century
- Saxon post milestone (Postmeilensäule), erected in 1731
- Old Chemist's (Alten Apotheke), built in 1690, a local historical museum since 1992.
