= Kahleberg =

Mountain in Altenberg, Germany

Coordinates: 50°44′59″N 13°43′57″E

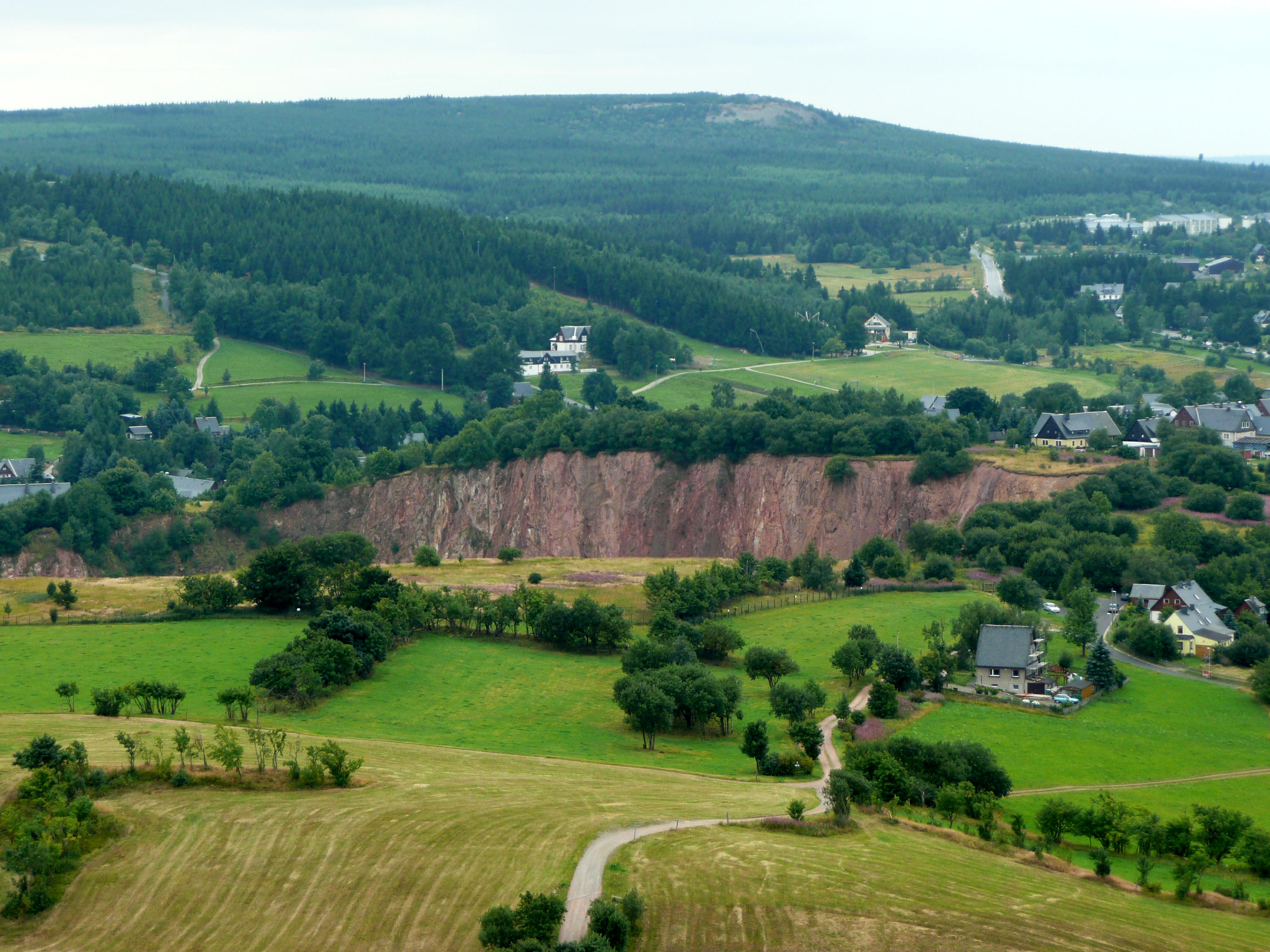

Highest point
- Elevation: 905 m (2,969 ft)

Geography
- Location: Saxony, Germany

Kahleberg (Bald Mountain) is a mountain in Saxony, Germany. Kahleberg is located 2 kilometres south-west of the mining town Altenberg, which is on the border of the Czech Republic. Kahleberg is part of the Ore Mountains (German: Erzgebirge), being the mountain with the highest elevation in the Saxon part of the Eastern Ore Mountains (German: Osterzgebirge).

== History ==
In the 1970s and 1980s, power plants, predominantly from the Czech side of the border, created acid rain and pollution which affected the forests on Kahleberg.
