= Trebnitz (river) =

River in Germany

Location
- Country: Germany
- State: Saxony

Physical characteristics
- Mouth
  - location: Müglitz
  - coordinates: 50.8695°N 13.8142°E

Basin features
- Progression: Müglitz→ Elbe→ North Sea

The Trebnitz is a river of Saxony, Germany. It is a right tributary of the Müglitz, which it joins near Glashütte.

== See also ==
- List of rivers of Saxony
