= Nassau, Saxony =

Coordinates: 50°46′N 13°32′E

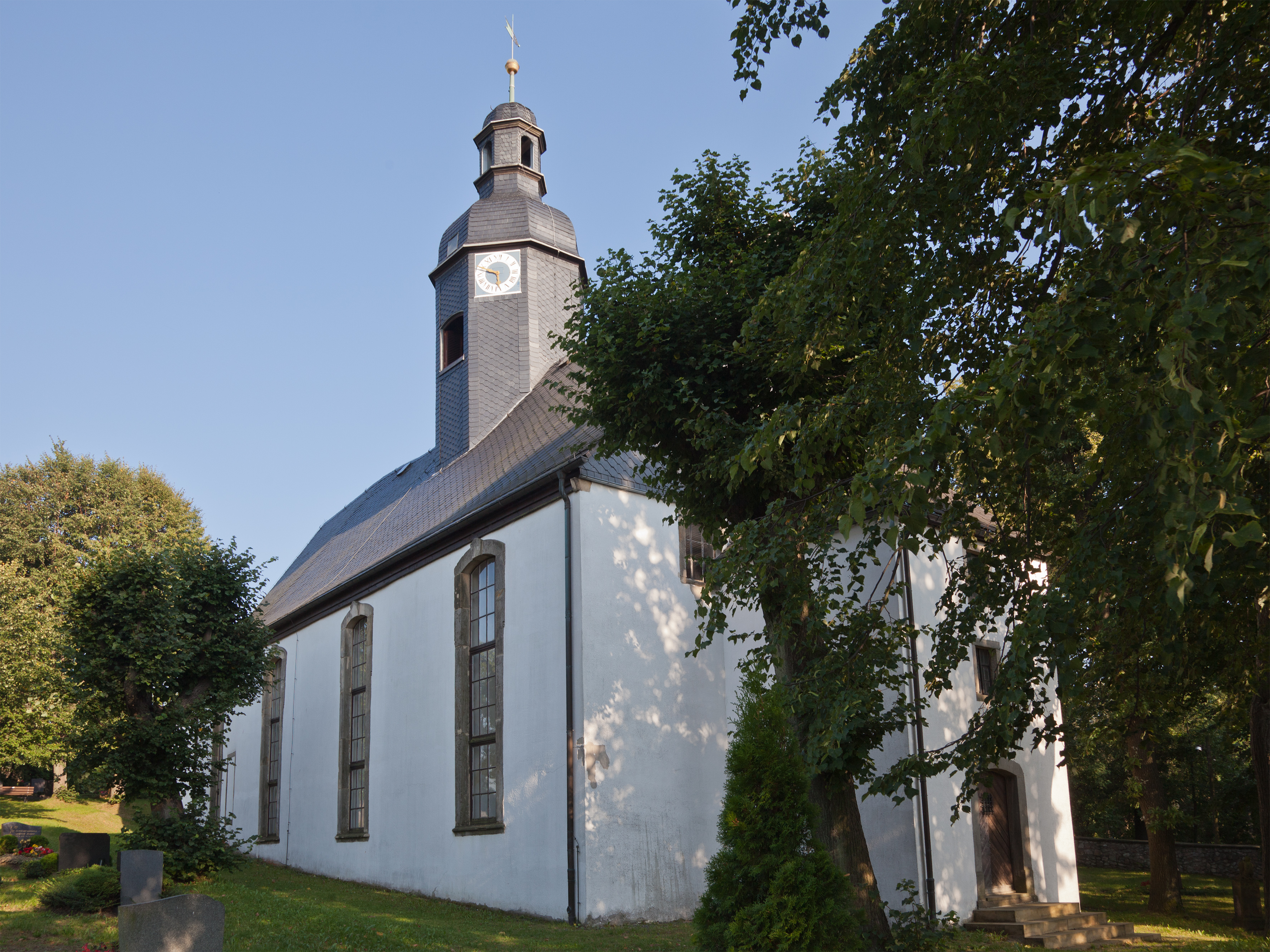
Church

Nassau is a small village near Dresden, the capital city of Saxony, and located in the Ore Mountains. It is part of the municipality Frauenstein. The church of Nassau holds one of the last organs built by Gottfried Silbermann.
