= Komáří hůrka =

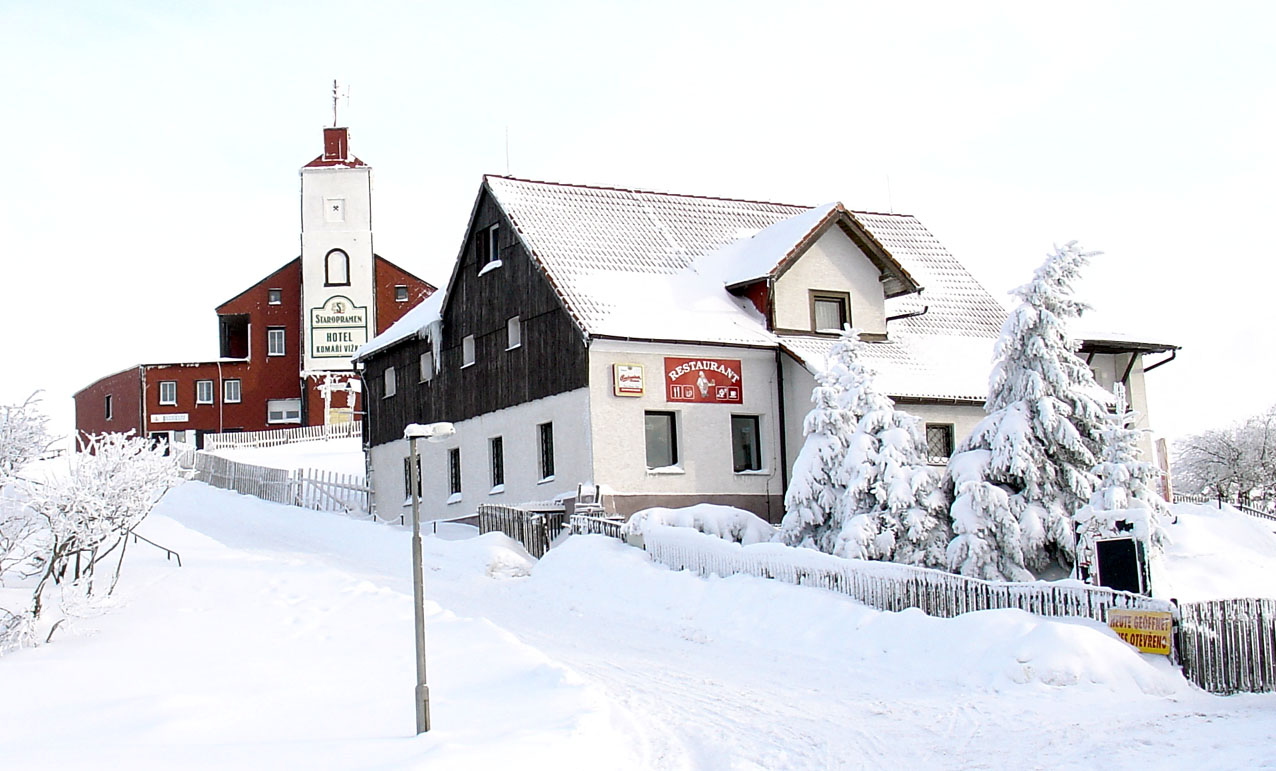
- Komáří hůrka with both mountain huts

Highest point
- Elevation: 807.5 m n.m. (2,649 ft)
- Coordinates: 50°42′24″N 13°51′24″E

Geography
- Location within Czech Republic
- Location: Czech Republic
- Parent range: Ore Mountains

Geology
- Mountain type: biotite gneiss with tin ore deposits

Climbing
- Access: 1568 by the tin mining industry

Komáří hůrka (German: Mückenberg) is one of the highest mountains in the Eastern Ore Mountains on the territory of the Czech Republic.

== Location and surroundings ==
Komáří hůrka lies northeast of Krupka (Graupen) and southeast of Cínovec (Böhmisch Zinnwald) immediately on the steepest section of the Ore Mountain escarpment. As a result, it is a good observation point, from which there are views in almost all directions of the compass. In addition the characteristic appearance of a fault block mountain range with its steep escarpment falling away to the south is very clearly seen from this part of the Ore Mountains.

== Historic photo gallery ==
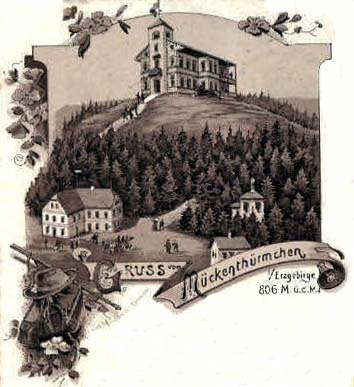
View around 1896

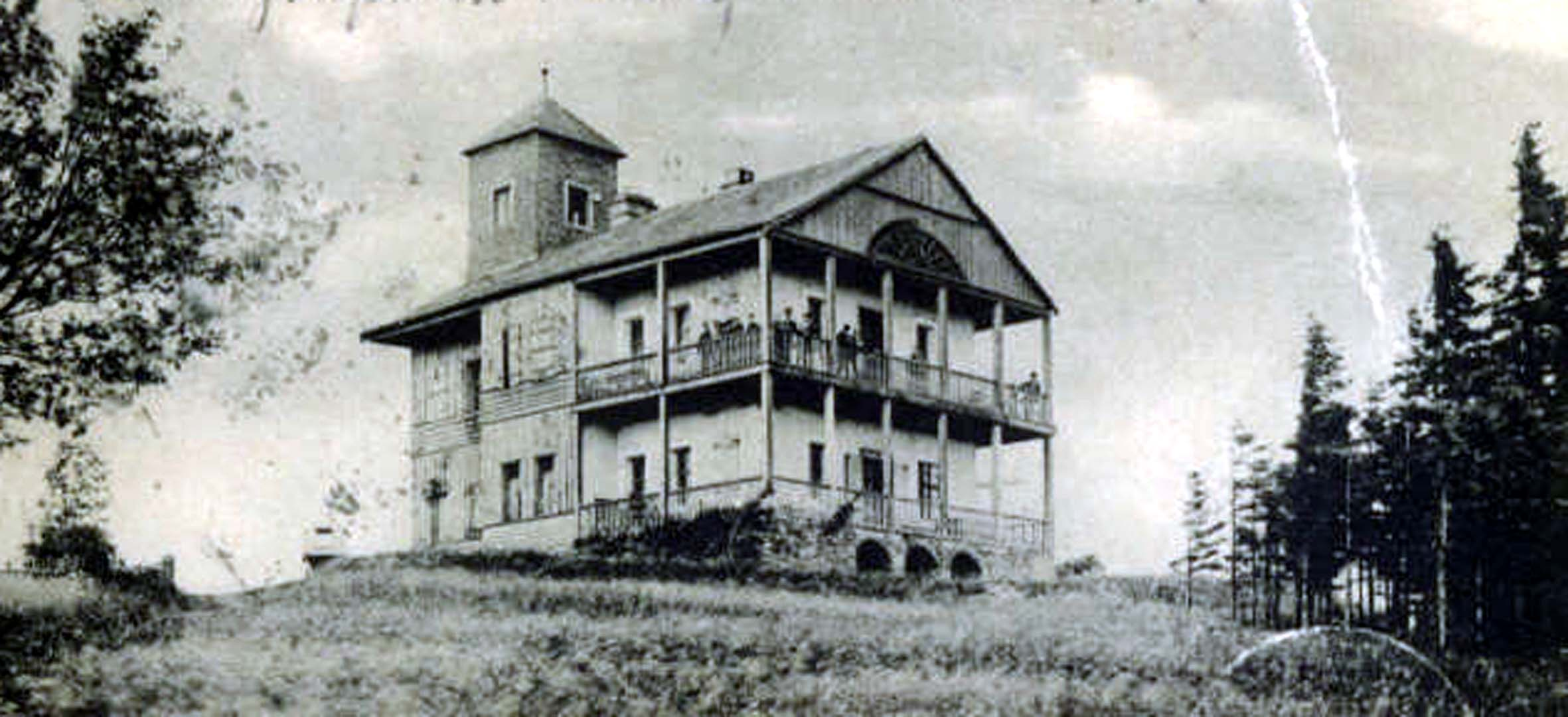
View around 1904

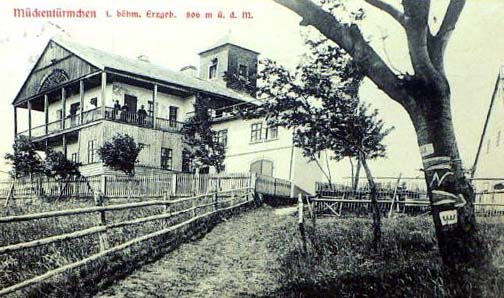
View around 1908

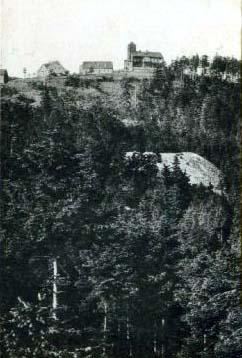
Around 1918
