= Geisingberg =

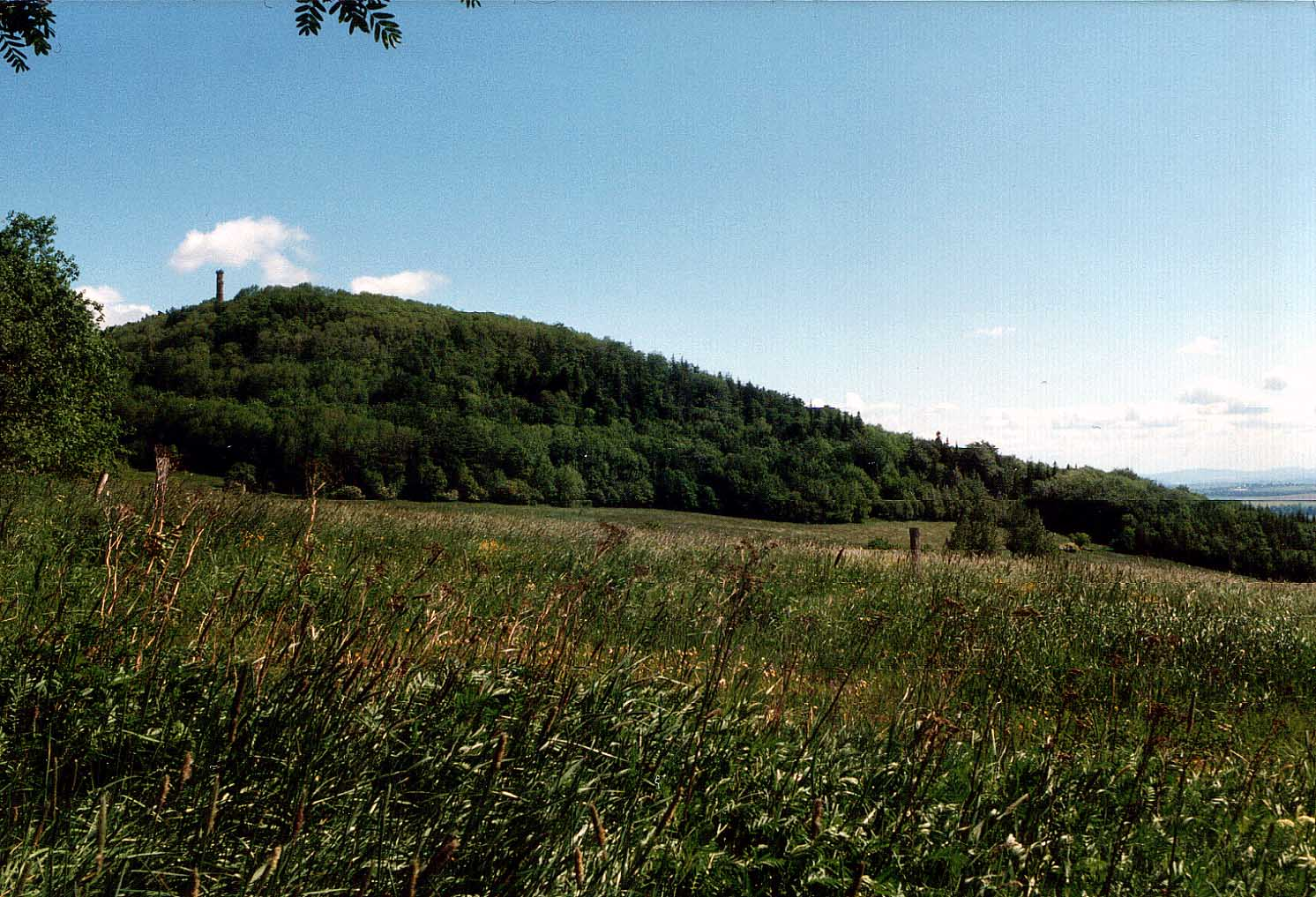

Highest point
- Elevation: 824 m (2,703 ft)
- Prominence: 110 m → Brautstock
- Isolation: 1.8 km → Raubennest
- Coordinates: 50°46′19″N 13°46′24″E

Geography
- Location within Saxony
- Location: Saxony, Germany
- Parent range: Ore Mountains

Geology
- Mountain type: cone
- Rock type: basalt

Climbing
- Access: Tower inaugurated in 1891

The Geisingberg is a striking basalt mountain in the eastern Ore Mountains in the German federal state of Saxony.

== Location and surrounding area ==
The Geisingberg lies in the upper Eastern Ore Mountains between the mining town of Altenberg and the village of Geising. On its northern and western slopes runs the track of the Müglitz Valley Railway. With a maximum incline here of 1:27 (37 per mil) it is one of the steepest working railway lines in Germany.

== Walking routes to the summit ==
- The easiest ascent runs from Altenberg along the road to the summit.
- Other walks being in Geising and Bärenstein.
- The Eisenach–Budapest international mountain path runs over the Geisingberg.

== See also ==
- List of mountains in the Ore Mountains
- The Gaising (Latvian: Gaiziņkalns), the highest point in Latvia.
