= Lockwitzbach =

River in Germany

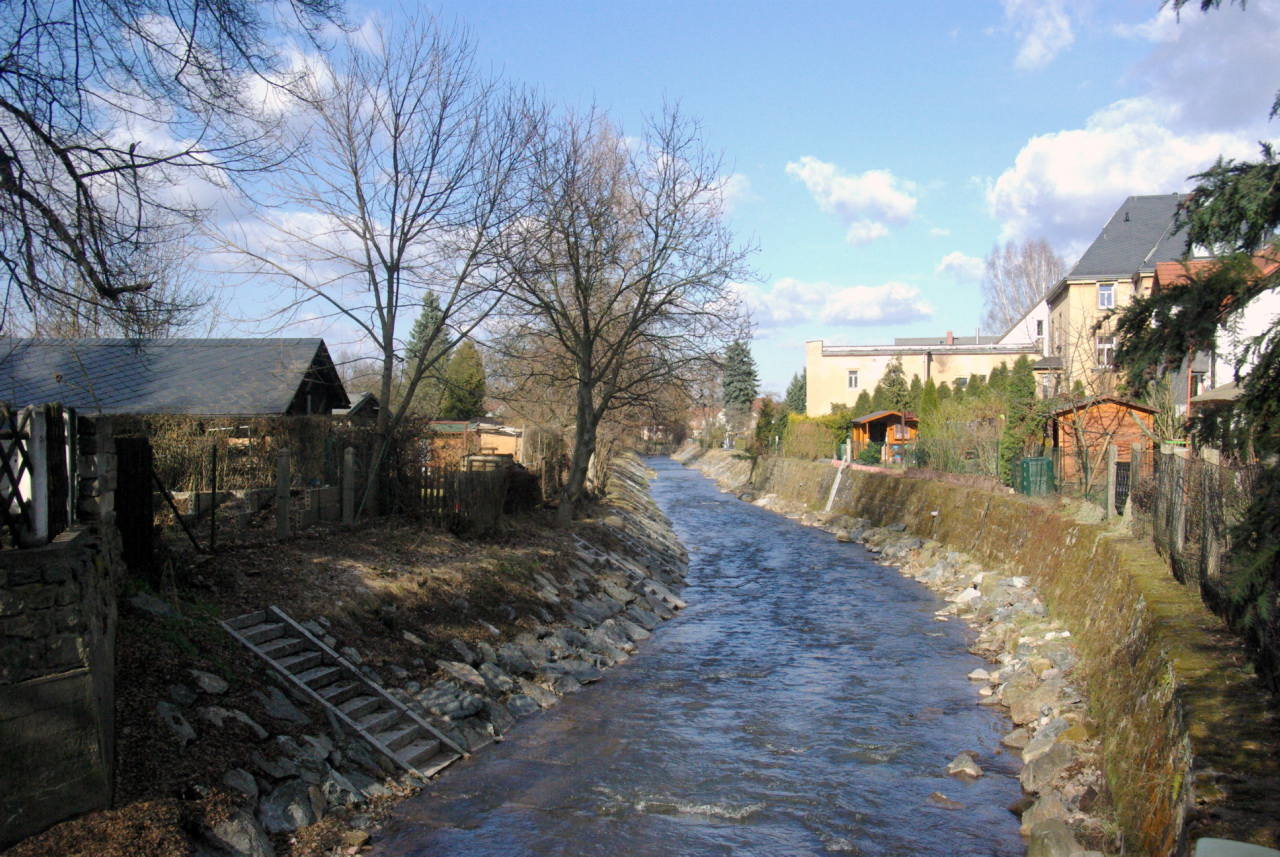

Location
- Country: Germany
- States: Saxony

Physical characteristics
- Mouth
  - location: Elbe
  - coordinates: 51°01′00″N 13°50′51″E

Basin features
- Progression: Elbe→ North Sea

The Lockwitzbach is a river of Saxony, Germany. It is a left tributary of the Elbe, which it joins near Dresden.

== See also ==
- List of rivers of Saxony
