= Geising =

- Stadtteil of Altenberg
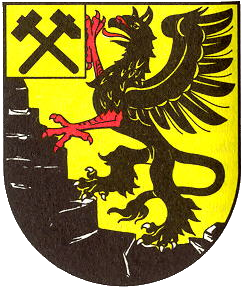
- Coat of arms
- Interactive map of Geising
- Location within Germany Location within Saxony
- Coordinates: 50°45′29″N 13°47′28″E
- Country: Germany
- State: Saxony
- District: Sächsische Schweiz-Osterzgebirge
- Town: Altenberg

Area
  - Total: 56.07 km^{2} (21.65 sq mi)
- Elevation: 666 m (2,185 ft)

Population (2009-12-31)
  - Total: 3,145
  - Density: 56.09/km^{2} (145.3/sq mi)
- Time zone: UTC+01:00 (CET)
  - Summer (DST): UTC+02:00 (CEST)
- Postal codes: 01778
- Dialling codes: 035056
- Vehicle registration: PIR
- Website: www.geising.de

Geising is a Stadtteil (municipal division) of Altenberg in the Sächsische Schweiz-Osterzgebirge district, in Saxony, Germany. It is situated in the Ore Mountains, close to the border with the Czech Republic, 13 km (8.1 mi) north of Teplice, and 32 km (20 mi) south of Dresden. Since 1 January 2011, it is part of the town Altenberg.

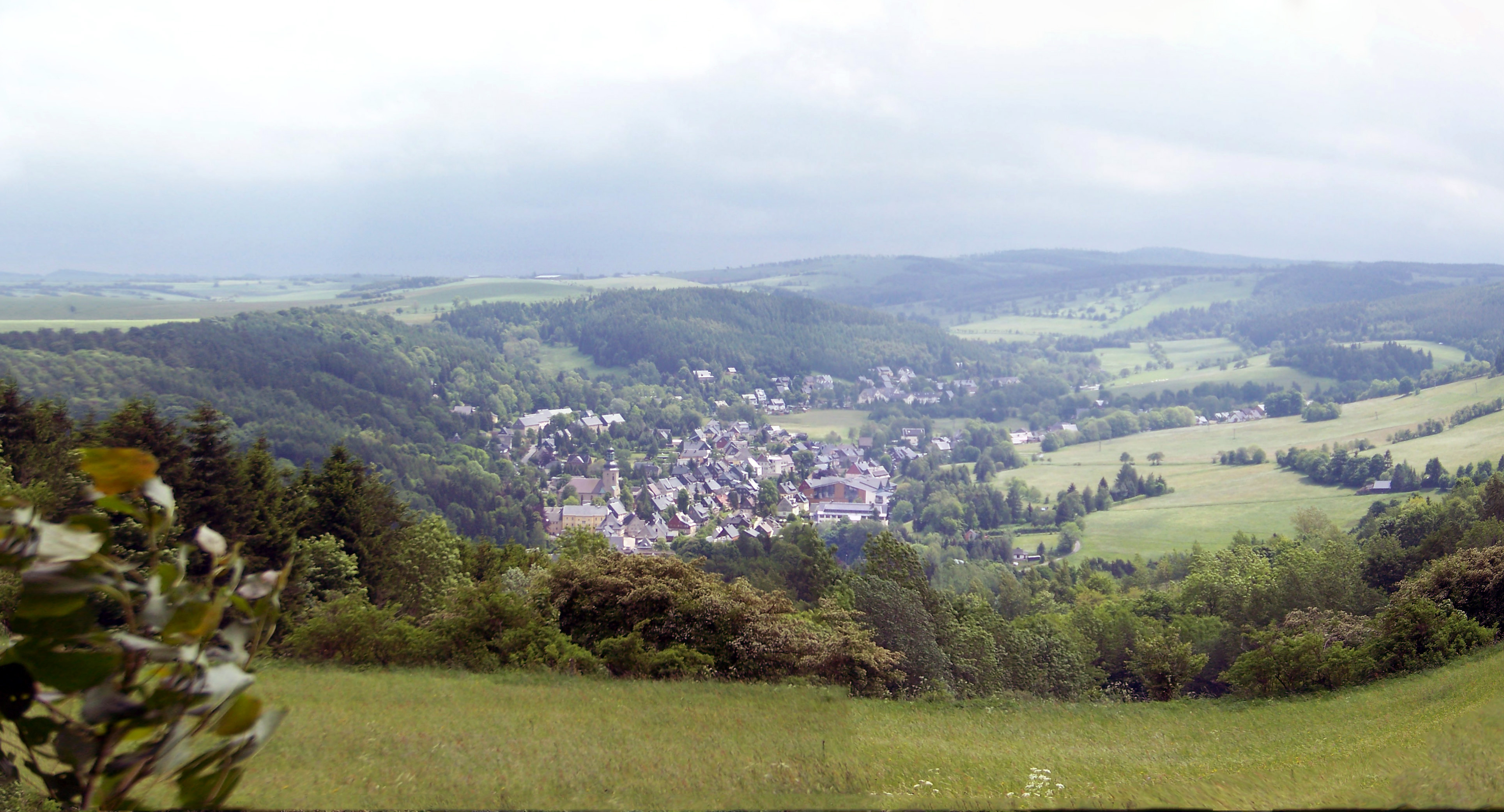
Panoramic view from the top of the Geisingberg into the Müglitztal valley across Geising
