= Eastern Ore Mountains =

Mountain range in Germany

Coordinates: 50.8°N 13.5°E

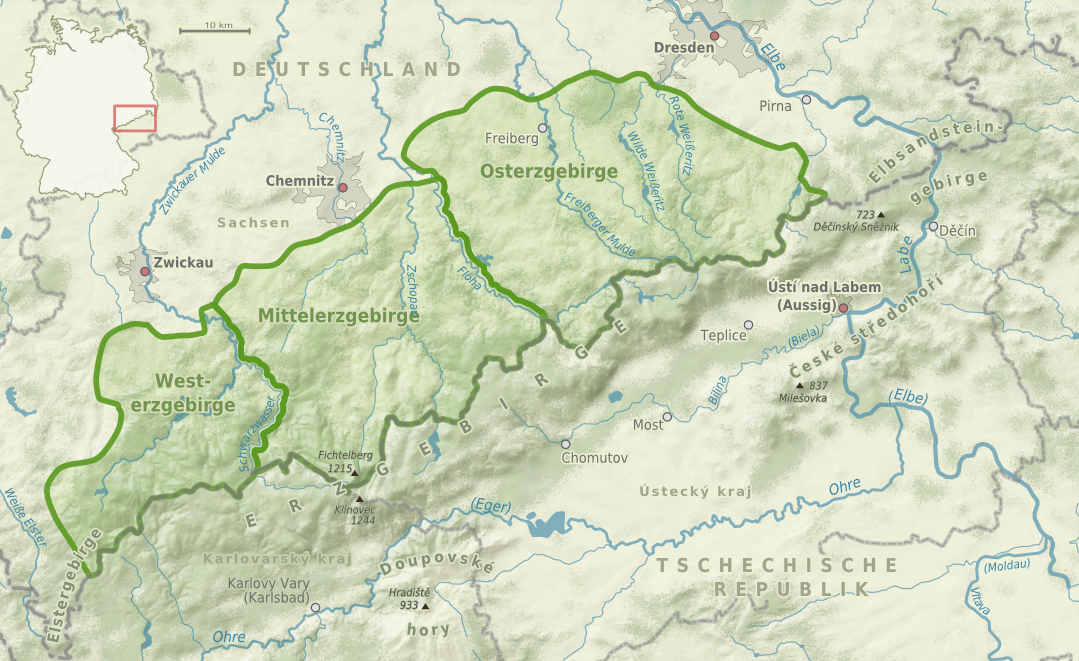
Natural regions in the Saxon Ore Mountains

The Eastern Ore Mountains (German: Osterzgebirge) form a natural region of Saxony that covers the eastern part (in area almost the eastern half) of the Saxon Ore Mountains range. Together with the Western and Central Ore Mountains, it is part of the larger Saxon Highlands and Uplands region. Its southern continuation beyond the German border covers an area of roughly the same extent in the Czech Republic.

== Geography ==
The region is bounded in the west by the valley of the Flöha river, itself part of the Central Ore Mountains region. In the northeast it borders on Saxon Switzerland, the German (northern) side of the Elbe Sandstone Mountains, at Bad Gottleuba. The boundary with the Ore Mountain Foreland to the north is rather unclear, roughly running from the town of Flöha along the Tharandt Forest to Tharandt. In the south, the crest of the mountain range closely follows the state border with the Czech Republic.

The highest point in the German (Saxon) region is the 905 m (2,969 ft) high Kahleberg. The highest peak on the Czech side is the Loučná (Wieselstein, at 956 m n.m.).

The upper regions of the Eastern Ore Mountains in the district of Mittelsachsen are part of the Ore Mountains/Vogtland Nature Park. The region includes the prominent Geisingberg peak as well as the Georgenfelder Hochmoor protected area.

== Settlements ==
- Altenberg
- Bärenstein
- Brand-Erbisdorf
- Bobritzsch
- Cämmerswalde
- Dippoldiswalde
- Eppendorf
- Frauenstein
- Freiberg
- Fürstenwalde
- Gahlenz
- Geising
- Glashütte/Sa.
- Hermsdorf/Erzgeb.
- Holzhau
- Kipsdorf
- Lauenstein
- Liebenau
- Mulda/Sa.
- Nassau
- Neuhausen/Erzgeb.
- Oberschöna
- Oederan
- Olbernhau
- Pfaffroda
- Rechenberg-Bienenmühle
- Rehefeld-Zaunhaus
- Reinhardtsgrimma
- Sayda
- Schellerhau
- Schmiedeberg
- Zinnwald

== Rivers and lakes ==
- Bobritzsch
- Flöha
- Freiberger Mulde
- Lockwitzbach
- Müglitz
- Red Weißeritz
- Müglitz Valley Retention Basin
- Striegis
- Saidenbach Reservoir
- Rauschenbach Reservoir
- Lichtenberg Reservoir
- Lehnmühle Reservoir
- Klingenberg Reservoir
- Malter Reservoir
- Trebnitz
- Unterer Großhartmannsdorfer Teich
- Wild Weißeritz

== Nature reserves ==
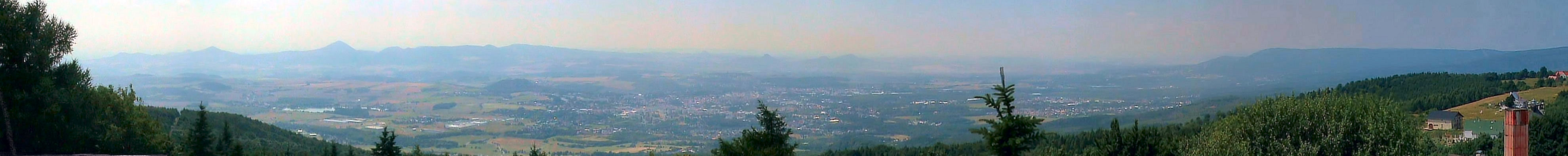
The character of the entire Ore Mountains as a fault-block is very clearly seen from the Mückenberg on the Czech side of the range

The upper areas of the Eastern Ore Mountains are part of the Ore Mountains/Vogtland Nature Park and include the following nature reserves:

- Black Grouse reserve of Fürstenau
- Fürstenau Heath nature reserve
- Protected mountain meadows in the Eastern Ore Mountains - a major conservation area with its own unique linear cairns
- Geisingberg nature reserve
- Georgenfelder Hochmoor

== Culture and sights ==
The Eastern Ore Mountains are also called the Crabapple Mountains due to the large numbers of wild apple and crabapple trees.

- Kohlhaukuppe
- The "Cross-border Mining Trail" project from Krupka via Geising, Altenberg and Zinnwald to Cinovec-Dubi.
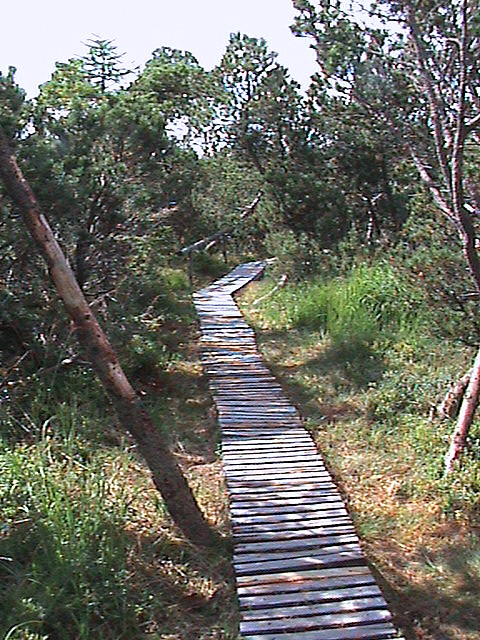
The Georgenfeld Raised Bog - a board walk

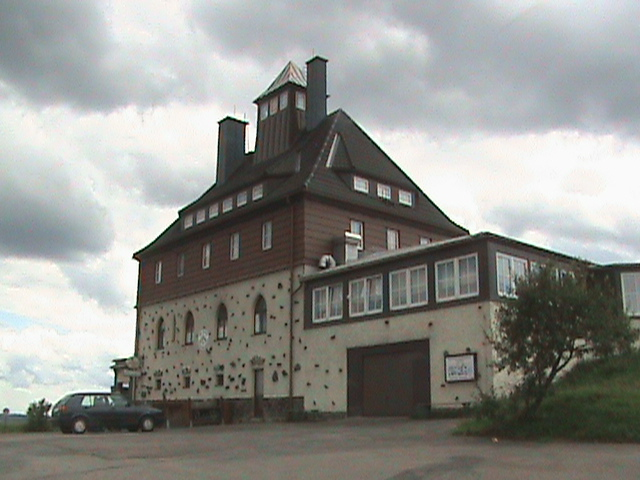
Hut on the Schwartenberg (789 m)

== See also ==
- List of mountains in the Ore Mountains
- List of mountains in Saxony
- List of regions of Saxony

== General sources ==
- Federal Agency for Nature Conservation (BfN)
  - Map services
  - Landscape fact files:
    - Upper regions of the Eastern Ore Mountains
    - Lower regions of the Eastern Ore Mountains
    - Tharandt Forest (in the north of the Eastern Ore Mountains)

== Literature ==
- Peter Rölke (Hrsg.): Wander- & Naturführer Osterzgebirge, Berg- & Naturverlag Rölke, Dresden 2007, ISBN 978-3-934514-20-1
- Grüne Liga Osterzgebirge: Naturführer Ost-Erzgebirge. Band 1: Tiere und Pflanzen des Ost-Erzgebirges. Sandstein Verlag, Dresden 2007, ISBN 978-3-940319-16-6 (enthält über 750 Artenbeschreibungen) Digitalisat (pdf-Dateien der einzelnen Kapitel)
- Grüne Liga Osterzgebirge: Naturführer Ost-Erzgebirge. Band 2: Natur des Ost-Erzgebirges im Überblick. Sandstein Verlag, Dresden 2007, ISBN 978-3-940319-17-3 (umfangreiche Darstellung zu Klima, Geologie, Kulturlandschaftsentwicklung) Digitalisat (pdf-Dateien der einzelnen Kapitel)
- Grüne Liga Osterzgebirge: Naturführer Ost-Erzgebirge. Band 3: Naturkundliche Wanderziele. Sandstein Verlag, Dresden 2007, ISBN 978-3-940319-18-0 (detaillierte Darstellung von 26 Teilgebieten des Naturraumes) Digitalisat (pdf-Datei, 14.7 MB)
- Erhard Unger: Die Klimaverhältnisse des östlichen Erzgebirges. in: Sächsische Heimatblätter, Heft 6/1975, S. 287-290
