= Wilisch (mountain) =

Mountain in Saxony, Germany

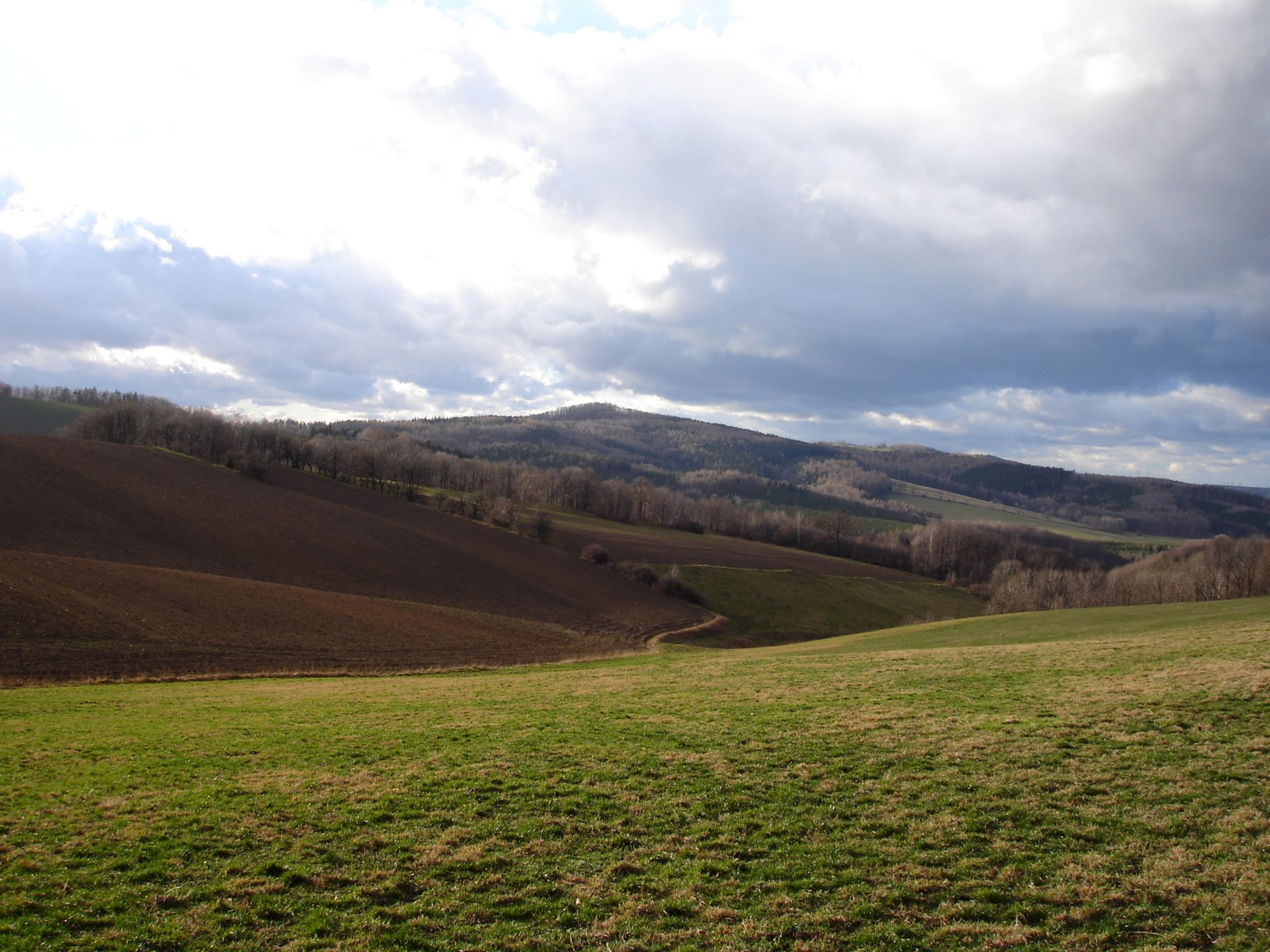
- The Wilisch seen from the Finckenfang

Highest point
- Elevation: 476 m (1,562 ft)
- Coordinates: 50°55′18″N 13°45′1″E

Geography
- Location within Saxony
- Location: Saxony, Germany

The Wilisch is a mountain in Saxony, Germany, near Dresden. Its height is 476 m (1,562 ft).
