= Müglitz (river) =

River in Germany

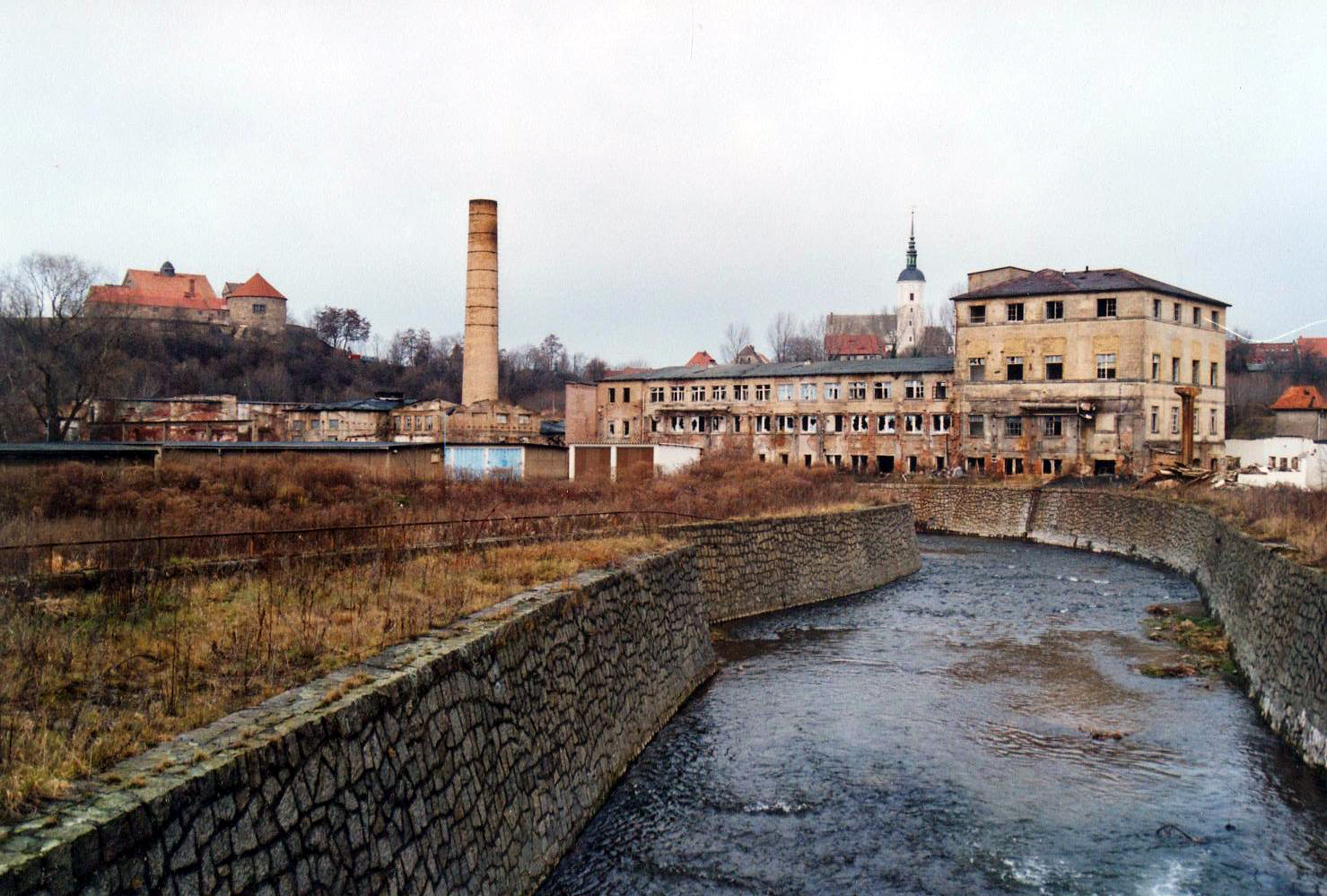
- The Müglitz in Dohna

Location
- Country: Germany
- State: Saxony
- Reference no.: DE: 53718

Physical characteristics
- Source
  - location: in the Eastern Ore Mountains on the border between Saxony and the Czech Republic
  - coordinates: 50°43′38″N 13°49′01″E
  - elevation: 749 m above sea level (NN)
- Mouth
  - location: in Heidenau into the Elbe
  - coordinates: 50°58′38″N 13°52′56″E
  - elevation: 113 m above sea level (NN)
- Length: 49 km (30 mi)
- Basin size: 209 km^{2} (81 sq mi)

Basin features
- Progression: Elbe→ North Sea
- Landmarks: Small towns: Altenberg, Glashütte, Dohna, Heidenau; Villages: Müglitztal

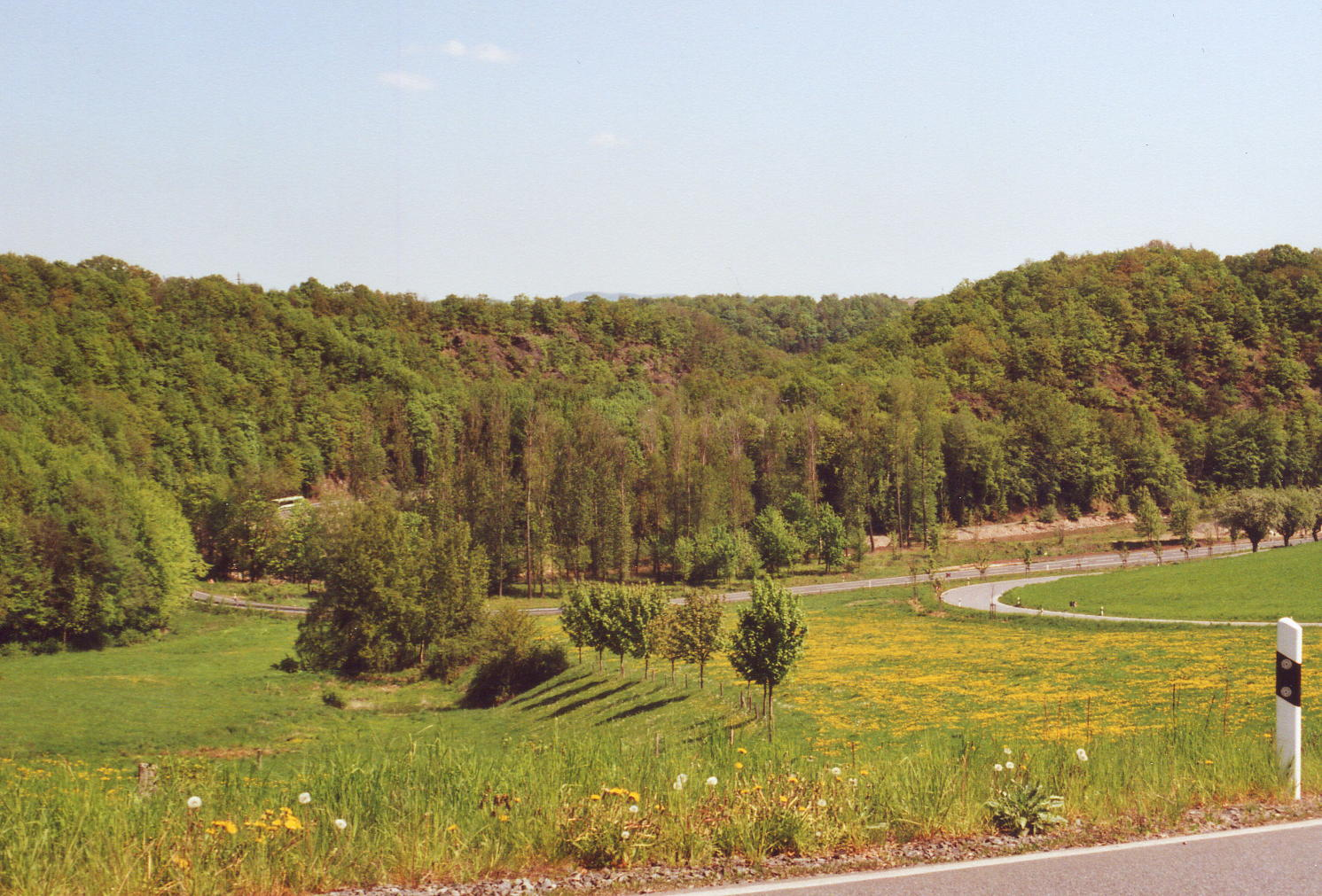
Müglitz valley near Weesenstein

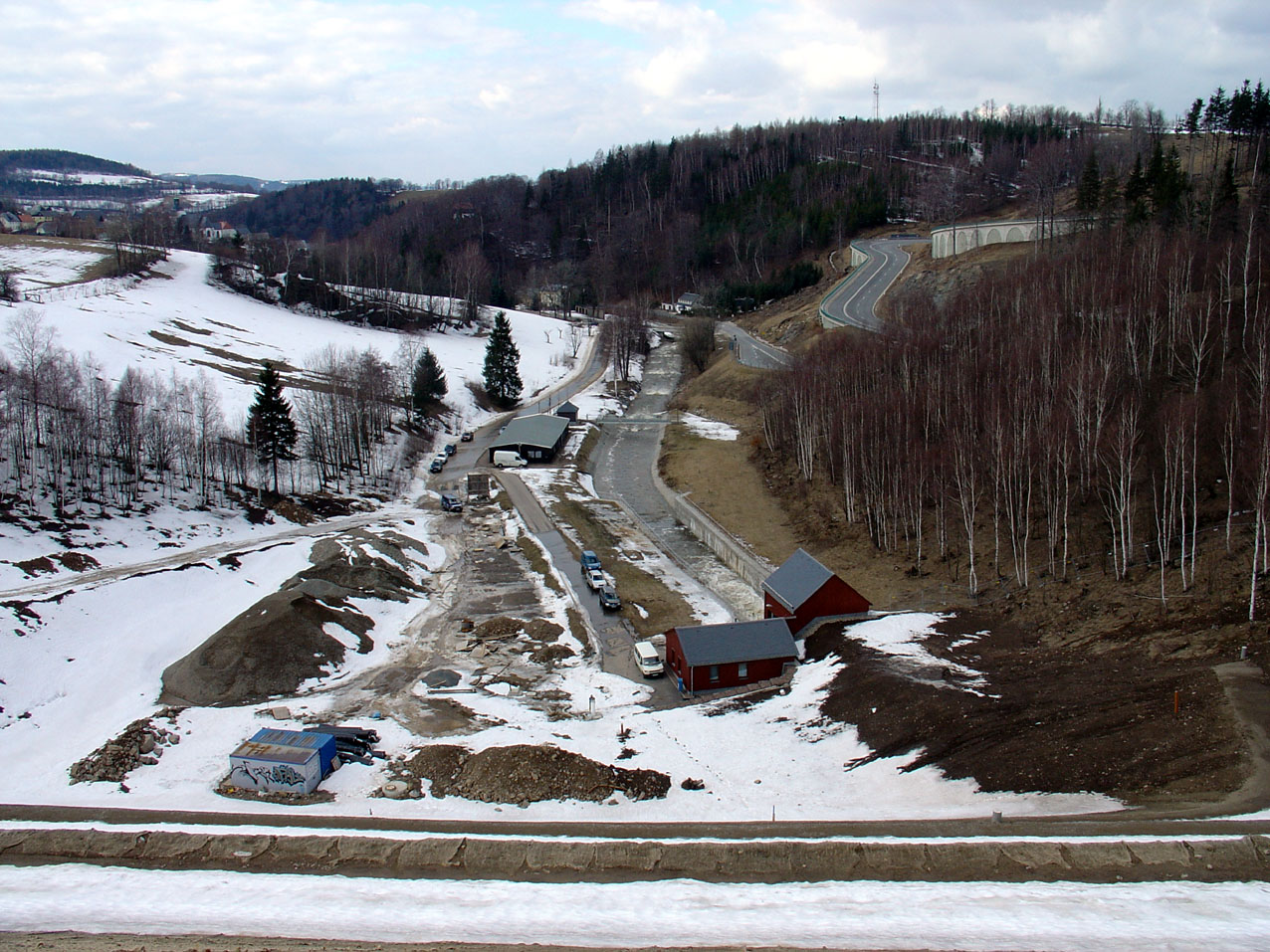
View of the Upper Müglitz valley from the crest of the retention basin

The Müglitz is a river, about 49 km (30 mi) long, and a left tributary of the Elbe in the German state of Saxony.

== Course ==
It rises in the Eastern Ore Mountains on the border between the German state of Saxony and the Czech Republic near the demolished Bohemian village of Mohelnice (German: Böhmisch Müglitz) from two headstreams:

- The White Müglitz (German: Weiße Müglitz, Czech: Mohelnice) rises near the border by the former village of Přední Cínovec (German: Vorderzinnwald) and then forms the border stream with Saxony.
- The Black Müglitz (German: Schwarze Müglitz, Schwarzbach, Sörnitz or Sernitz, Czech: Černý potok) rises near the abandoned village of Ebersdorf (Cz: Habartice) and its middle reaches flow through the northern part of the Black Meadows (Schwarzen Wiesen; the color label refers to the boggy character of the land). The name Sörnitz comes from Slavic zornice 'mill stream'. During severe weather on 8 July 1927 the stream became a torrent that tore up the ground, changed its riverbed, and flowed down the valley as a mud flow. From its source in the Haberfeld Forest (German: Haberfeldwald), the stream forms the state border for about 2 km (1.2 mi).

From the German village of Müglitz (part of Altenberg), that lies only just below the confluence of the White and Black Müglitz, the Müglitz runs entirely on Saxon territory. It flows by several villages including Lauenstein (a district of Altenberg), Glashütte, Müglitztal, and Dohna, before emptying into the Elbe at Heidenau.

== See also ==
- List of rivers of Saxony

== Sources ==
- Deutsche Akademie der Wissenschaften zu Berlin [Ed.]: Um Altenberg, Geising und Lauenstein. Werte der deutschen Heimat, Band 7. Berlin 1964.
- Martin Ernst & Manfred Stephan: Rezente Hochflutsedimente der Müglitz südlich Dresden (Erzgebirge, Sachsen) im Vergleich mit Sandsteinbänken der Erdgeschichte. Jahresberichte und Mitteilungen des Oberrheinischen Geologischen Vereins, Neue Folge, 89: 11–35, Stuttgart 2007.
- Jürgen Helfricht: Wahre Geschichten um Sachsens schönstes Tal. Tauchaer Verlag, Taucha 2000, ISBN 3-89772-022-1.
