= Naundorf =

Naundorf may refer to:

== Geography ==
- Naundorf, Saxony, in the Torgau-Oschatz district, Saxony
- Naundorf, Thuringia, in the Altenburger Land district, Thuringia
- Naundorf bei Seyda, in the Wittenberg district, Saxony-Anhalt
- Groß Naundorf, in the Wittenberg district, Saxony-Anhalt
- Naundorf (Radebeul), part of Radebeul, Saxony
- Naundorf (Brandenburg), a part of Fichtwald in the Elbe-Elster district, Brandenburg
- Naundorf (Bobritzsch), a part of Bobritzsch (municipality) in the Freiberg district, Saxony
- Naundorf (Striegis), a part of Tiefenbach, Saxony
- Naundorf (Oberlausitz), a part of Doberschau-Gaußig, Saxony
- Naundorf bei Dippoldiswalde, a part of Schmiedeberg, Saxony
- Naundorf bei Ruhland, part of Schwarzheide, Brandenburg
- Naundorf (Struppen), part of Struppen, Saxony

== People with the surname ==
- Gert Naundorf (born 1936), German sinologist
- Karl Wilhelm Naundorff, German clockmaker who claimed to be Louis XVII of France
