= Otto Kümmel =

German art historian and museum director (1874–1952)

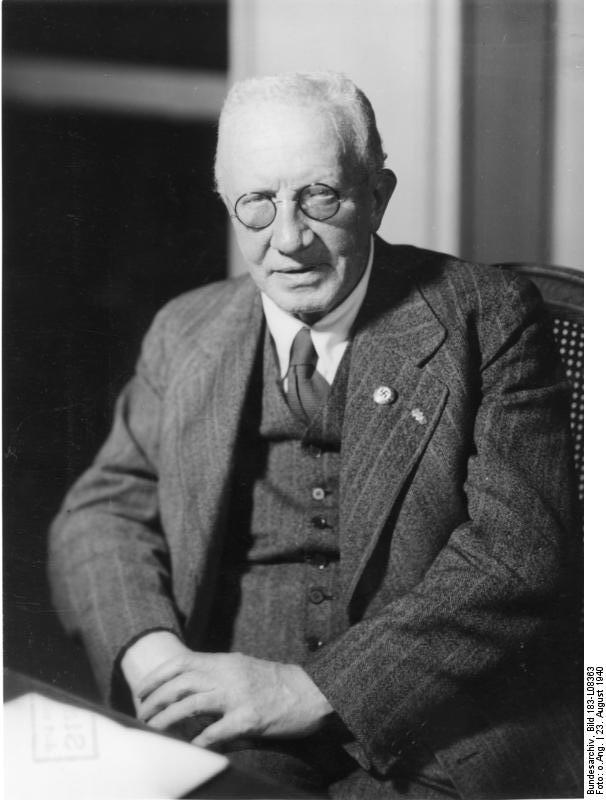
Otto Kümmel 1940, Fotografie im Bundesarchiv

Otto Kümmel (22 August 1874 – 8 February 1952) was a German art historian, academic teacher, founder and director of the Museum of Asian Art in Berlin and general director of the Berlin State Museums.

== Life ==
Born in Blankenese, Kümmel was a son of the civil engineer Werner Kümmel and the seventh of twelve children. After taking his Abitur at the Athenaeum Stade, Kümmel studied classical archaeology and philosophy from 1893 at the University of Freiburg. In 1896 and 1897, he also attended lectures in Bonn and at the Institut national des langues et civilisations orientales in Paris, where he learned the Chinese and Japanese languages. In 1901, he was awarded a Doctorate in Freiburg on the basis of a thesis on Egyptian ornamental plants. He did his military service as a one-year volunteer in Lahr.

In 1902 he did a Volontariat in the Museum für Kunst und Gewerbe Hamburg. From 1 April 1905 to September 1906, he was employed as curator at the Museum Natur und Mensch Freiburg in Freiburg. There, he met the ethnologist Ernst Grosse, who, like the painter Hermann Gehri, lived under the patronage of Marie Meyer.

Kümmel was married to Therese Klee and had a daughter and four sons, including the German physicist Hermann Kümmel. Two of his sons were killed in the Second World War.

=== Career in Berlin ===
After Wilhelm von Bode had appointed him as assistant director in Berlin, Kümmel was dismissed from Freiburg in September 1906. From 1906 to 1909, he was in Japan, where he acquired a basic stock of Japanese art for the Berlin museums. In 1912, together with the art historian William Cohn (1880-1961) he edited the Ostasiatische Zeitschrift until it ceased publication in 1943 due to the war. He served as an officer in the First World War. On 9 October 1923, the Museum für Ostasiatische Kunst (Museum of East Asian Art), which he conceived and directed, was opened in today's Martin-Gropius-Bau; in the meantime, the collection has become a department of the Museum of Asian Art. Throughout his life, he organised numerous exhibitions of East Asian art in Germany and other countries.

Since the Machtergreifung he was a member of the NSDAP. At his instigation, Social Democratic Party of Germany member Eduard Erkes first lost his licence to teach at the University of Leipzig and then his position as curator at the Leipzig Museum of Ethnography, and he was also banned from speaking and publishing. The denunciation of Erkes was certainly not an isolated case. Kümmel became general director of the Prussian Museums in Berlin in 1934. Although he had already reached the age limit in 1939, he had to continue in office due to the war. In 1945, a large part of his work in Berlin was destroyed by the war, and he himself was dismissed from the service as a member of the NSDAP.

=== Looted art ===
In 1940, Kümmel was commissioned by Joseph Goebbels to compile in three volumes a secret, 319-page List of the Absolutely Looted Works of Art in Foreign Possession. Such works of art that had ever been in German ownership, going back to the 15th century, Kümmel declared to be Aryan art, which was thus to be stolen and brought "home to the Reich". Works of art in Jewish possession could also be confiscated without German provenance. For example, Jan Vermeer's oil painting The Astronomer from the Rothschild collection ended up in Adolf Hitler's private possession. Jonathan Petropoulos calls him one of the leaders of museum looting in the Third Reich.

== Appreciation ==
Kümmel was the first European art historian to master the Japanese and Chinese languages, both written and spoken, and a luminary in his field. His deep involvement in the looted art taken by the Nazis does not make it easy to assess his scholarly work and merits today. In the detailed biography by his grandson Wolfgang Close, the National Socialist period is left out. Gert Naundorf, professor of sinology at the Julius-Maximilians-Universität Würzburg, who wrote the article on Kümmel in the Neue Deutsche Biographie, also omits the period from 1933 onwards.

== Publications (selection) ==
- Ägyptische und mykenische Pflanzenornamentik. Dissertation, Universität Freiburg, 1901
- Das Kunstgewerbe in Japan. 1911
- Die Kunst Ostasiens. 1921 (französisch 1926)
- Ostasiatisches Gerät (together with Ernst Grosse). 1925
- Ausstellung chinesischer Kunst [catalogue], Berlin
- Chinesische Kunst, 200 Hauptwerke d. Ausstellung der Gesellschaft für Ostasiatische Kunst. 1930
- Meisterwerke japanischer Landschaftskunst, 1939
- Welfenschatz und religiöse Malerei: Ausstellung. Eröffnet zum 75. Deutschen Katholikentag, 18. August 1952, Berlin 1952
