= Gert Naundorf =

German sinologist

Gert Naundorf (born 1936 in Göttingen) is a German sinologist and academic who has been a professor of Sinology at the University of Würzburg (Julius-Maximilians-Universität Würzburg) in Germany.

== Life and work ==
Naundorf was born in 1936 in Göttingen, Germany. He studied Chinese language, culture, and philosophy, and completed his doctoral studies in Sinology at the University of Würzburg in 1972. His dissertation, Aspekte des anarchischen Gedankens in China on the anarchistic strand in Chinese thought and the intellectual traditions, included a study and translation of the Daoist philosophical text Wu Neng Tzu 無能子.

Naundorf served as an assistant and later as a Privatdozent (private lecturer) in Sinology at the University of Würzburg from the late 1960s through the 1980s. He was appointed professor of Sinology at the same institution in 1988, a position he held into the early 2000s. His work at Würzburg contributed to the development of the institute’s focus on Chinese philosophy, religion, and cultural studies.

He also co‑edited scholarly works such as the festschrift Religion und Philosophie in Ostasien, published in 1985 in honour of his mentor Hans Steininger (de).

Together with priest Detlev Graf von der Pahlen, Naundorf also committed to the reopening of the 'Romanesque Chapel' of the Teutonic Order (Deutschherren) in Würzburg (as "Vertrauensmann"). Since 2014, the Teutonic Order Research Centre (German: Forschungsstelle Deutscher Orden) at the University of Würzburg has been studying the history of the Order.

Gert Naundorf contributed some biographical articles to the Neue Deutsche Biographie (New German Biography). In the article of Otto Kümmel, f.e., was omitted the period from 1933 onwards.

== Selected publications ==
- Aspekte des anarchischen Gedankens in China: Darstellung der Lehre und Übersetzung des Textes Wu Neng Tzu (Doctoral dissertation, Julius-Maximilians-Universität, Würzburg, 1972)
- Würzburger Chinabeziehungen: Bericht und Bemerkungen (Münster: Aschendorff, 1975)
- (Editor, with Karl‑Heinz Pohl and Hans‑Hermann Schmidt) Religion und Philosophie in Ostasien: Festschrift für Hans Steininger zum 65. Geburtstag (Würzburg: Königshausen + Neumann, 1985)
