= August Conrady =

German sinologist and linguist

August Conrady (Chi. 孔好古) (28 April 1864, Wiesbaden – 4 June 1925, Leipzig) was a German sinologist and linguist. From 1897 he was professor at the University of Leipzig.

Conrady first studied classical philology, comparative linguistics and Sanskrit; he continued with Tibetan and Chinese language. He put forward his research findings in 1896 on the relationship between the prefix and tones in the Sino-Tibetan languages, in the work Eine Indo-Chinesische causative-Denominativ-Bildung und ihr Zusammenhang mit den Tonaccenten (1896).

He worked with Sven Hedin, translating the roughly 150 3rd century manuscripts Hedin had found in the ruins of Loulan in 1901. Conrady purchased a part of the castle Mildenburg in Miltenberg, Bavaria, when it was auctioned off after the death of his uncle, Wilhelm Conrady to exhibit his art collection.

He became extraordinary professor of sinology in Leipzig in 1896, that had among its students as future sinologist leaders Gustav Haloun, Otto Maenchen-Helfen, Lin Yutang, Bruno Schindler and his nephew and successor in Leipzig, Eduard Erkes. In 1916 he put forward the theory of an original relationship between Austric and Sino-Tibetan languages. He became a full professor of Sinology in 1920. Materials from the Danish orientalist Kurt Wulff concluded partially in Conrady's development of the theory, and Wulff continued Conrady's work in this field.

== Works (selected) ==
- — (1891). Das Newâri: Grammatik und Sprachproben.
- — (1891). Fünfzehn Blätter einer nepalesischen Palmblatt-Handschrift des Nārada.
- — (1891). Das Hariçcandranṛityam. Ein altnepalesisches Tanzspiel.
- — (1893). Die Geschichte der Siamesen.
- — (1896). Eine Indo-Chinesische causative-Denominativ-Bildung und ihr Zusammenhang mit den Tonaccenten. hdl:2027/hvd.32044060297447.
- — (1905). Acht Monate in Peking. Eindrücke und Studien aus der Zeit der chinesischen Wirren.
- — (1916). "Eine merkwürdige Beziehung zwischen den austrischen und den indochinesischen Sprachen". Aufsätze zur Kultur-und Sprachgeschichte vornehmlich des Orients: Ernst Kuhn zum 70. pp. 475–504.
- — (1920). Die chinesischen Handschriften- und sonstigen Kleinfunde Sven Hedins in Lou-Lan. Stockholm Generalstabens Litografiska Anstalt.
