= Brtnice =

- Town
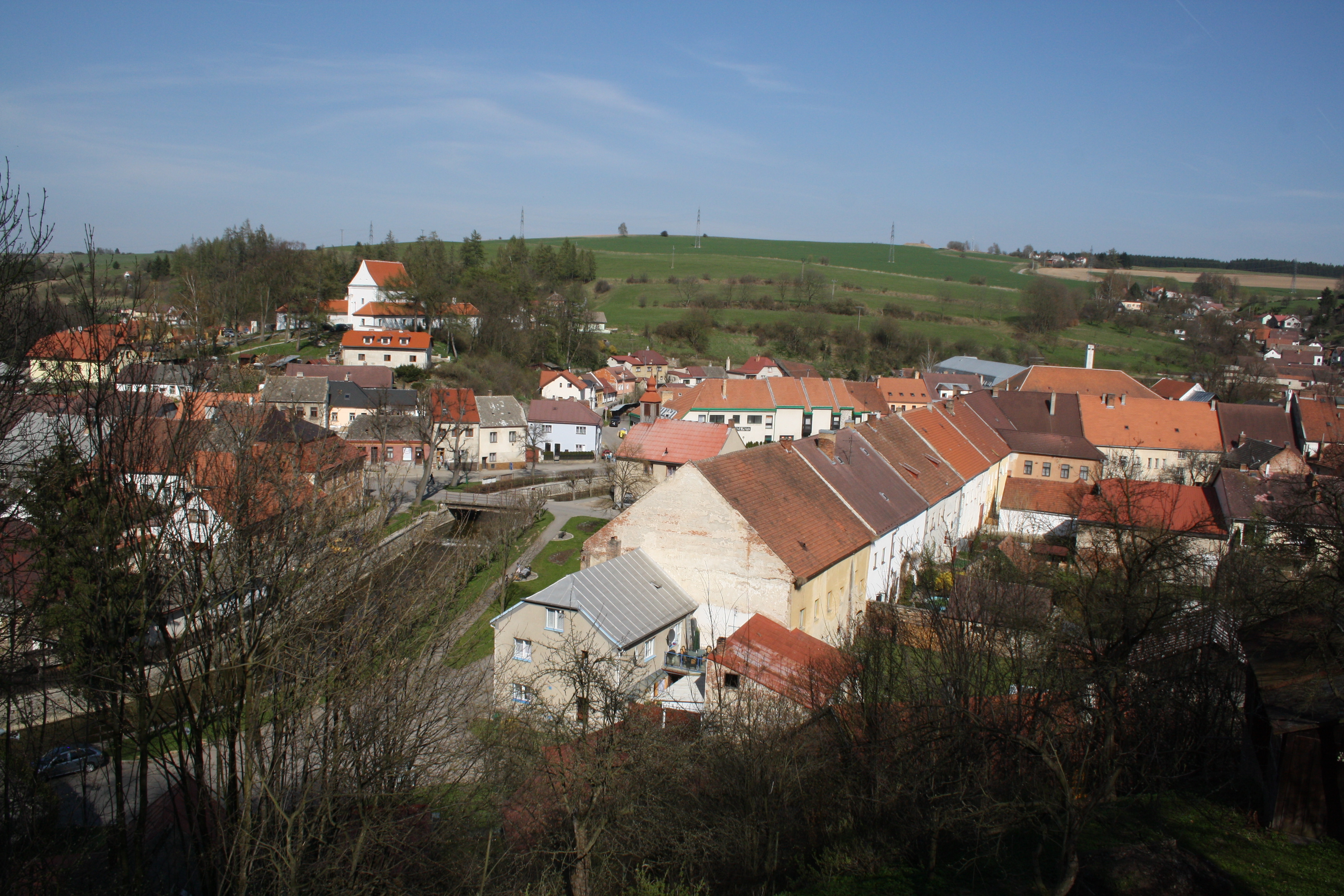
- View from the castle park towards Brtnice

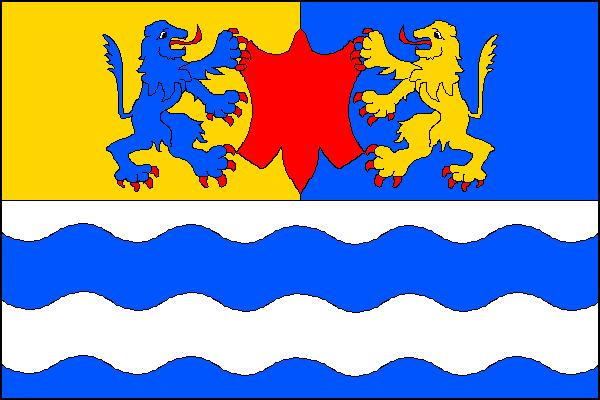
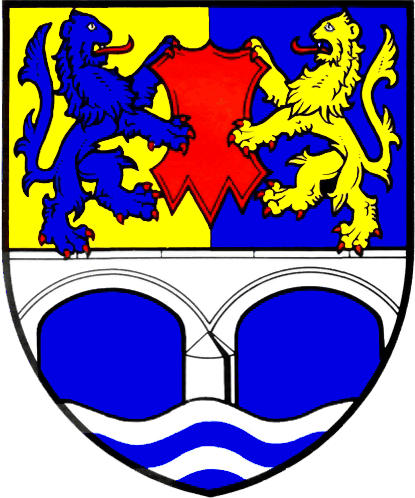
- Flag Coat of arms

- Location in the Czech Republic
- Coordinates: 49°18′30″N 15°40′34″E
- Country: Czech Republic
- Region: Vysočina
- District: Jihlava
- First mentioned: 1234

Government
  - Mayor: Jan Přibyl

Area
  - Total: 74.13 km^{2} (28.62 sq mi)
- Elevation: 515 m (1,690 ft)

Population (2026-01-01)
  - Total: 3,870
  - Density: 52.2/km^{2} (135/sq mi)
- Time zone: UTC+1 (CET)
  - Summer (DST): UTC+2 (CEST)
- Postal code: 588 32
- Website: www.brtnice.cz

Brtnice (Czech pronunciation: [ˈbr̩tɲɪtsɛ]; German: Pirnitz) is a town in Jihlava District in the Vysočina Region of the Czech Republic. It has about 3,900 inhabitants. The town is located on the Brtnice River in the Křižanov Highlands.

Brtnice was founded in the first half of the 13th century at the latest, but it became a town only in 2000. The historic town centre is well preserved and is protected as an urban monument zone. Among the main landmarks of the town are the Brtnice Castle and the Renaissance town hall.

== Administrative division ==
Brtnice consists of ten municipal parts (in brackets population according to the 2021 census):

- Brtnice (2,385)
- Dolní Smrčné (83)
- Jestřebí (138)
- Komárovice (86)
- Malé (29)
- Panská Lhota (218)
- Přímělkov (126)
- Příseka (238)
- Střížov (320)
- Uhřínovice (89)

== Etymology ==
The name is derived from the Old Czech word brtě, i.e. 'apiaries'. It was the place where apiaries stood.

== Geography ==
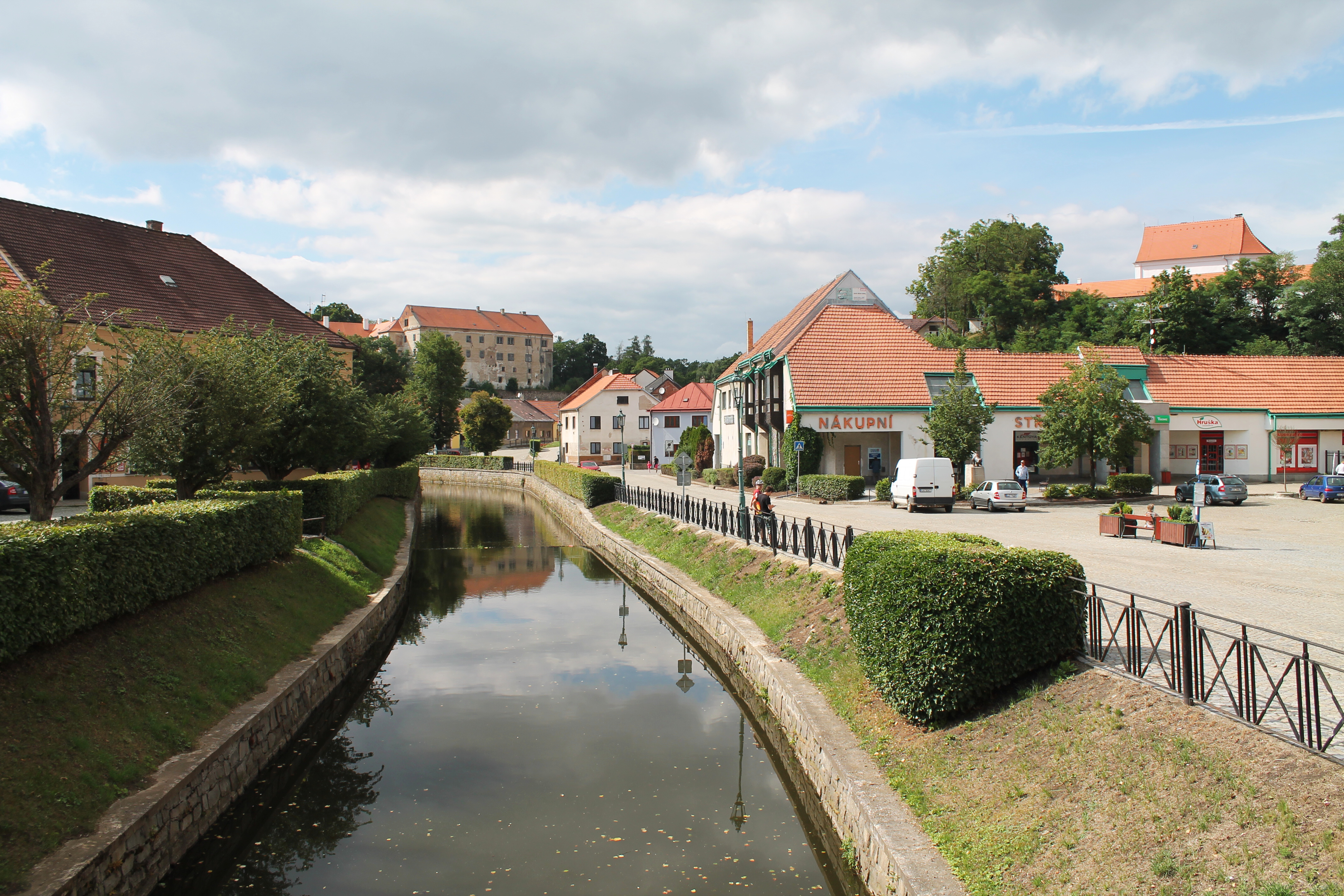
Brtnice River in the town centre

Brtnice is located about 11 kilometres (7 mi) southeast of Jihlava. It lies in the Křižanov Highlands. The highest point is at 663 m (2,175 ft) above sea level. The Brtnice River flows through the town.

== History ==
The first written mention of Brtnice is from 1234, when it was donated to the convent in Předklášteří by King Wenceslaus I. From 1410 until 1623, it was owned by the Brtnický branch of the Waldstein family. During their rule, Brtnice prospered and the castle was built. In 1588, a church, that time consecrated to Saint Matthias, was built next to the castle.

After 1623, Brtnice was acquired by the Italian noble family of Collalto, which owned it until 1945. This family also cultivated Brtnice. The family had built a monastery and had rebuilt the castle, interiors of the church, and houses on the square in the Renaissance and Baroque styles.

Brtnice was promoted to a town in 2000.

== Demographics ==
Historical population

Year	Pop.	±%
1869	5,235	—
1880	5,378	+2.7%
1890	5,154	−4.2%
1900	5,083	−1.4%
1910	5,198	+2.3%

Year	Pop.	±%
1921	4,971	−4.4%
1930	4,758	−4.3%
1950	3,797	−20.2%
1961	3,976	+4.7%
1970	3,528	−11.3%

Year	Pop.	±%
1980	3,541	+0.4%
1991	3,592	+1.4%
2001	3,656	+1.8%
2011	3,625	−0.8%
2021	3,712	+2.4%

Source: Censuses

== Transport ==
There are no railways or major roads passing through Brtnice. The II/405 road connects the town with Jihlava.

== Sights ==
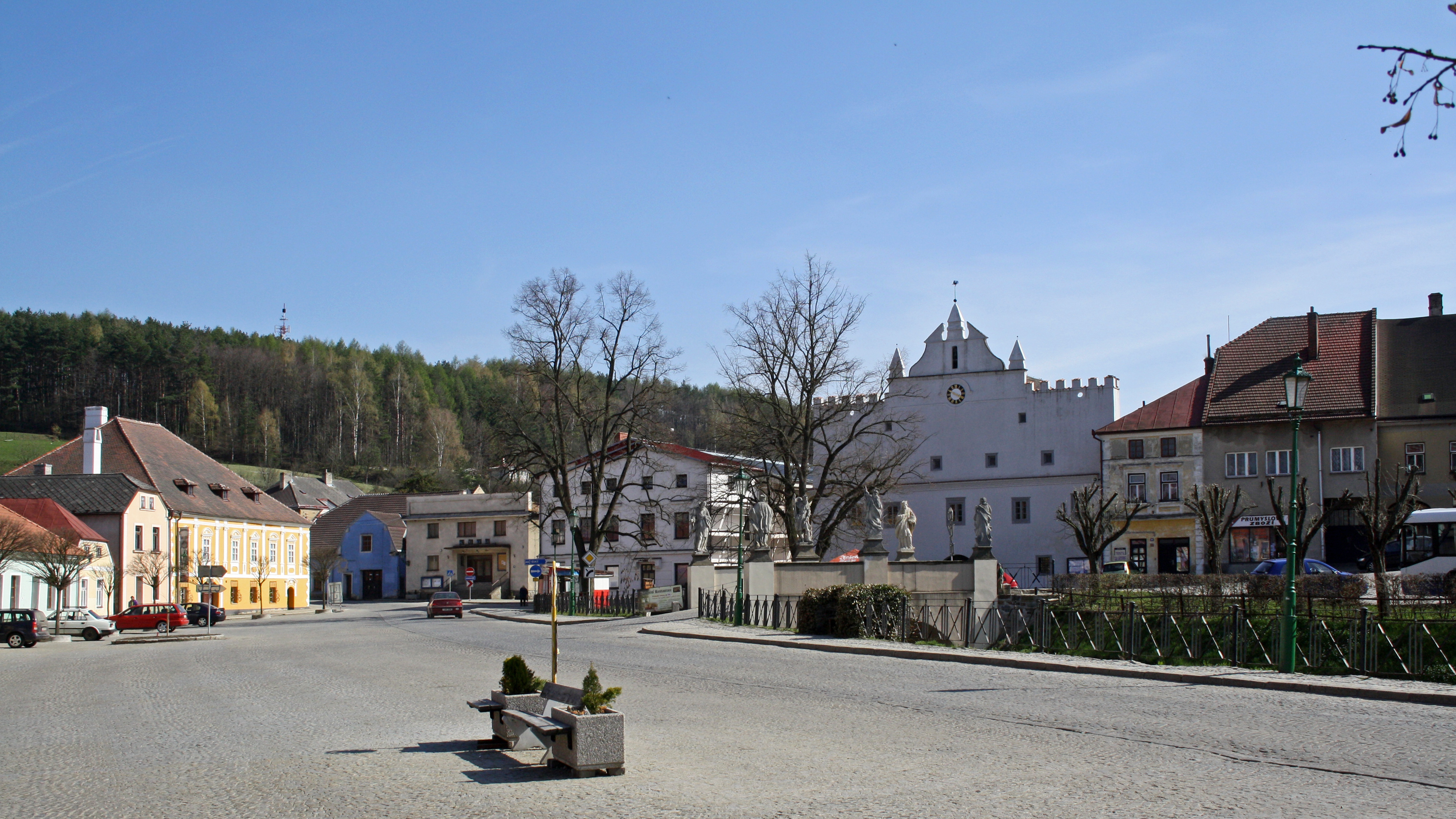
Town square with the town hall

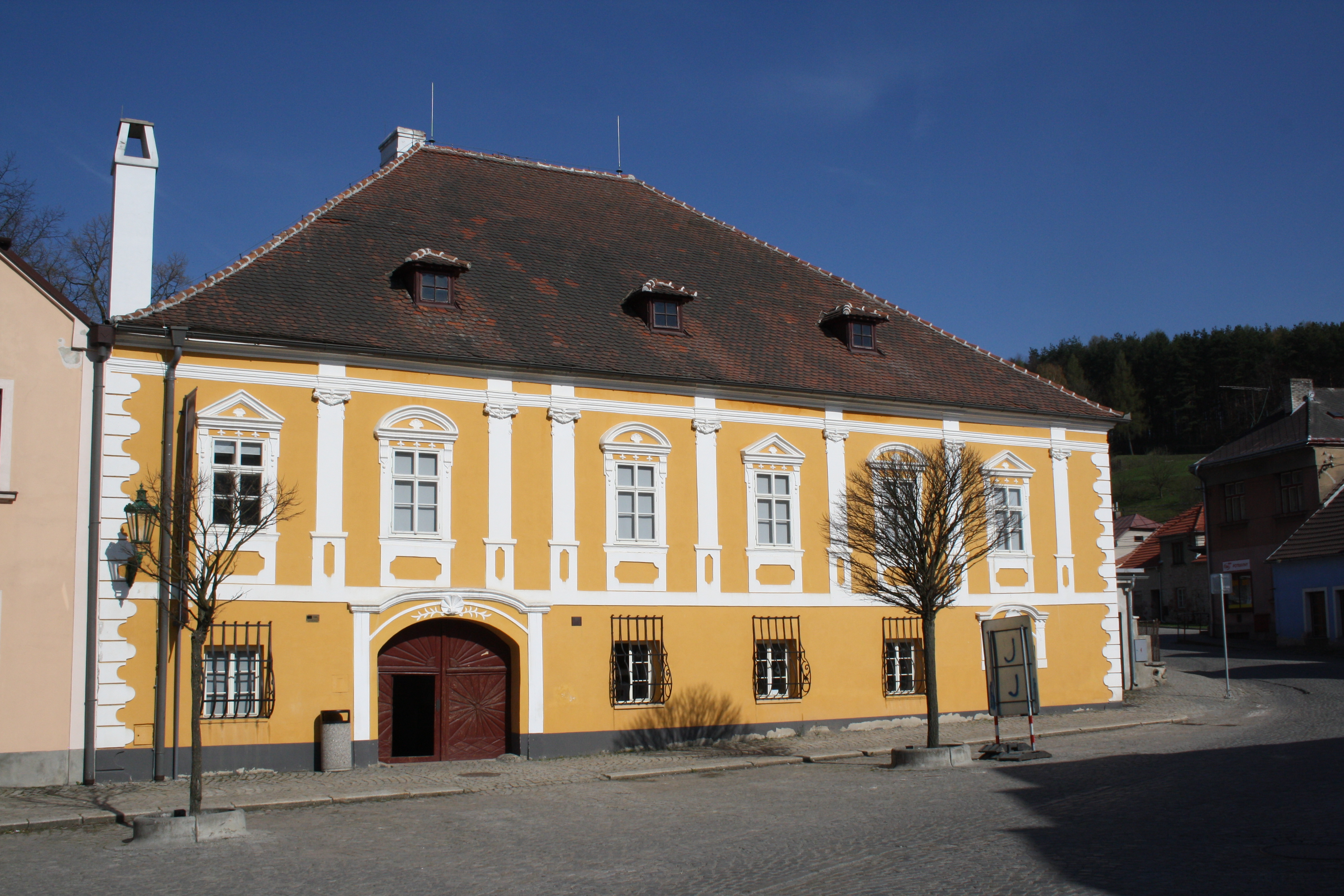
Museum of Josef Hoffmann

The historic centre and the main square are divided by the Brtnice River. There are two Baroque bridges over the river. One of the bridges, the so-called Jewish Bridge, connected the town with the Jewish quarter and is only half decorated with statues. Apart from the bridges, the main landmark of the square Náměstí Svobody is the Renaissance town hall from 1580.

The large birth house of the architect Josef Hoffmann on the town square belongs to main tourist destinations. Following a 1992 exhibition in Brtnice on Hoffmann's work mounted by the town and MAK in Vienna, the house was turned into a permanent exhibition space. From 2006, the building has been administered by the Moravian Gallery in Brno, with the assistance of MAK.

Near the square is the Church of Saint James the Great. It is a simple Baroque church, built in 1776–1784, which replaced an older medieval church. The church contains valuable artworks.

The Brtnice Castle is located on a hill above the town centre. It is a unique large complex of Renaissance castle with Baroque modifications from 1650–1655, surrounded by Gothic fortifications, with English style castle park founded in 1817. The castle contains expositions on medieval torture and history of plague epidemics. Next to the castle complex is the former Minim monastery with Church of Blessed Giuliana of Collalto.

The ruin of the Rokštejn Castle is located near the Panská Lhota village. This early Gothic castle was conquered and demolished in the 15th century by Matthias Corvinus and his army.

== Notable people ==
- Hermann of Solms-Hohensolms-Lich (1838–1899), German nobleman and politician
- Josef Hoffmann (1870–1956), Austrian architect
- Gustav Haloun (1898–1951), sinologist
- Baruch Kurzweil (1907–1972), Israeli literary critic
- William Pachner (1915–2017), American painter
- Zdeněk Měřínský (1948–2016), archaeologist and historian; died here

== Twin towns – sister cities ==
Brtnice is twinned with:

- Orpund, Switzerland
