= William Pachner =

American painter

- Born: April 7, 1915; Brtnice, Austria-Hungary
- Died: November 17, 2017 (aged 102); Woodstock, New York, U.S.
- Spouse: Lorraine Koolman

William Pachner (April 7, 1915 – November 17, 2017) was a Czech-born American painter who made his home in Woodstock, New York from 1945.

== Life ==
He studied art in Vienna and worked as an illustrator in Prague before coming to the United States in 1939 on the eve of World War II. During the war, his anti-fascist anti-Nazi illustrations appeared in the foremost national magazines. When he learned in 1945 that all members of his family had been exterminated by the Germans, he quit his commercial career and resolved never again to do a commercial job, but to paint what he felt.

A former teacher at the Art Students League in Woodstock, Pachner has had numerous one-man exhibitions in New York City and Florida. In later life he had shows at the Tampa Museum of Art, the Florida Holocaust Museum, and the Museum of Fine Arts (St. Petersburg, Florida).

He turned 100 in April 2015. Pachner has two children: Ann Koolman Pachner (born 1944) and Charles Edward Pachner (born 1946). Pachner died in November 2017 at the age of 102.

== Artistic style ==
Pachner was a colorist whose work included satiric drawings, erotic figurative pieces, biblical Judaic and Christian themes, photomontages, and paintings. Late in his career, he began working in black and white after losing sight in one eye. The works in this exhibition address themes of loss regarding sight, family, and homeland. While the drawings utilize movement and gesture, they also depict violence. These final works address various meanings regarding human life.

About his paintings, Pachner said, "I want, in each work, the world, like my countryman Mahler, the whole pie, not just one triangular wedge of it, but all of it in all of its contradictions, paradoxes, ironies, unbearable sorrows, indescribable joys, tragic comedy, farce, pathos and drama, both authentic and fraudulent. The world, I say to myself, on which all this takes place simultaneously—the world so incomprehensible, so dear, so much in need of our care, of our embrace."

== Reception ==
Robert Martin, former art critic for the Tampa Times, once remarked that Pachner's work evidence "…an existential vision of life lived on the trembling brink of pain, and the knowledge of one's own mortality." He further noted that Pachner's "… central European cultural roots have given this artist, as it did so many of America's most humanistic artists when they came here during and after world war II, this ability to experience life in an existential way, always leaving himself open to pain and joy. It is unlikely that the experience of two very different cultural environments will ever again so profoundly influence artists as they did at that particular moment in history."

In writing about Pachner's 2012 Tampa Museum show, Paul Smart of the Woodstock Times commented, "The works are abstract on the surface, and yet narrative in the ways the artist uses his mastery of the medium to relate internal stories and experiences that are less emotional outbursts, as seen in classic Abstract Expressionist works, and more like psychological essays, or spiritual contemplations in paint." the Florida Holocaust Museum and the Museum of Fine Arts (St. Petersburg, Florida)

Hereceived a Guggenheim Fellowship in Fine Arts, two Ford Foundation grants, and an American Academy and Institute of Arts and Letters Award for painting.

His work is represented in many museums and private collections, including the Whitney Museum, The Hirshhorn Museum and Sculpture Garden, The Butler Institute of American Art, The Florida Holocaust Museum, the Tampa Museum of Art, the Museum of Fine Arts (St. Petersburg, Florida)s, and the John and Mable Ringling Museum of Art.
