= Adolf-Wuerth-Center for the History of Psychology =

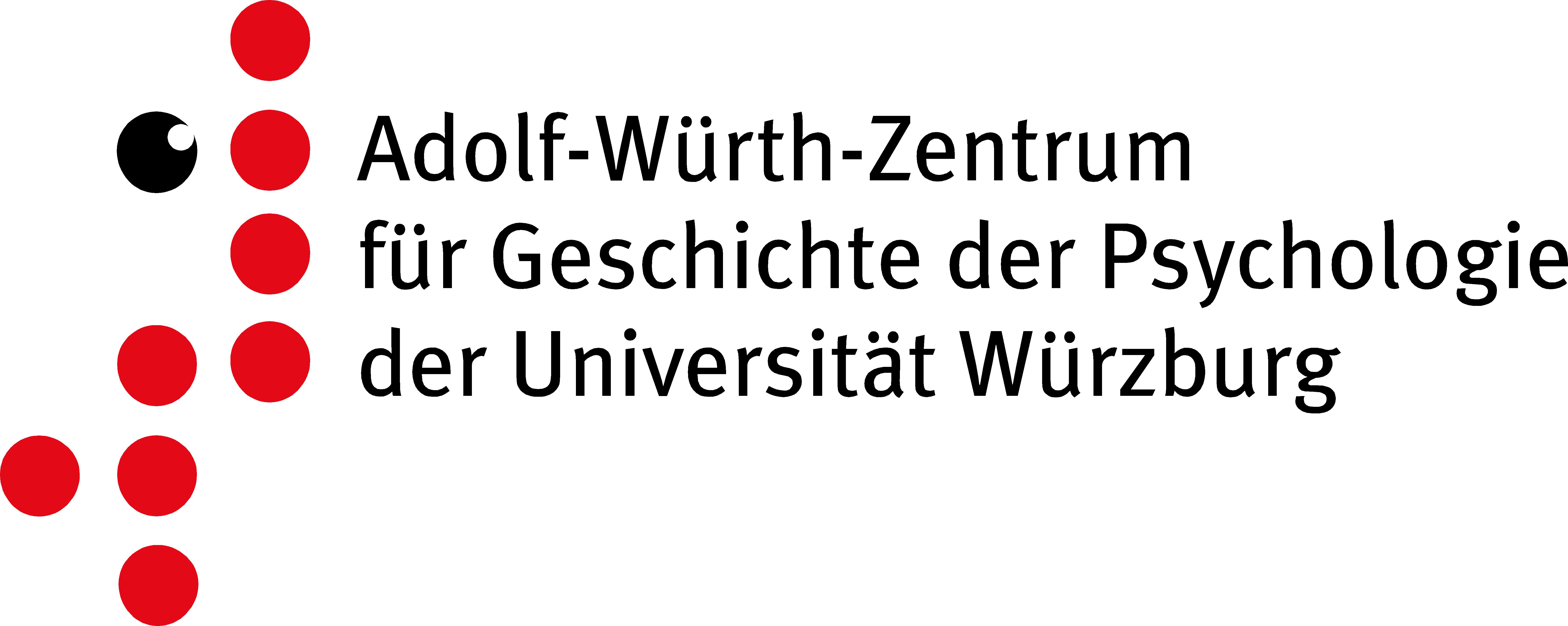

Location
- Würzburg, Bavaria; Germany

Information
- Founded: 1981 (founded in Passau) 2009 (reopened in Würzburg)
- Authority: University of Würzburg
- Director: Armin Stock
- Website: http://www.awz.uni-wuerzburg.de/en/home/

The Adolf-Wuerth-Center for the History of Psychology is a scientific institution of the Julius-Maximilians-University of Würzburg.

== History ==
The collection of the history of psychology was founded by Werner Traxel in 1981 as part of the Institute for History of Modern Psychology at University of Passau. In 2006, the target agreements of the Free State of Bavaria - as a result of the Mittelstraß commission - aimed to relocate the collection to the university city of Würzburg. The aim was to bundle strengths of different universities.
