= Gustav Haloun =

Czech orientalist and sinologist (1898–1951)

Gustav Haloun (12 January 1898, Brtnice, Moravia, Austria-Hungary — 24 December 1951, Cambridge, England) was a Czech sinologist. He studied in Vienna under Arthur von Rosthorn and in Leipzig under August Conrady from where he received his Dr. phil. in 1923.

He obtained habilitation at Charles University in Prague where he lectured in 1926-1927. Afterwards he taught at Halle University (1928-1931), and Göttingen University (1931-1938), before becoming Chair of Chinese Language and History at Cambridge University, succeeding Arthur Christopher Moule and preceding Edwin G. Pulleyblank in that position.

He researched about the Hundred Schools of Thought, Bactria, Da Yuezhi, and Guanzi texts (cf. Guan Zhong).

Haloun's papers are held at Cambridge University Library.
