= Zdeněk Měřínský =

Zdeněk Měřínský (16 January 1948 in Jihlava – 9 September 2016 in Panská Lhota) was a Czech archeologist and historian specializing in medieval archaeology, Czech and Austrian medieval history, casteollogy (building and function of castles), evolution of the settlement structure, and topography. He was the head of the Department of Archaeology and Museology (Faculty of Arts) at the Masaryk University. He also lectured at other universities. He was the author of several hundred scientific studies, author or co-author of several important monographs.

== Selected works ==
- Morava ve středověku [Moravia in the Middle Ages] (1999)
- České země od příchodu Slovanů po Velkou Moravu I. [The Czech Lands from the Arrival of the Slavs to Great Moravia I.] (2002)
- České země od příchodu Slovanů po Velkou Moravu II. [The Czech Lands from the Arrival of the Slavs to Great Moravia II.] (2006)
- Dějiny Rakouska History of Austria (2006, co-author)
- Morava na úsvitě dějin [Moravia at the Dawn of History] (2011)
- Stěhování národů a východ Evropy [Migration Period and Eastern Europe] (2013, co-author)
