= Eduard Erkes =

German sinologist and historian (1891–1958)

August Eduard Erkes (23 July 1891 – 2 April 1958) was a German sinologist and ethnologist.

== Biography ==
Eduard Erkes was born in Genoa to a German family that resided in Italy. His father Heinrich Erkes was a merchant and member of the German Social Democratic Party who later became an Icelandic scholar. Eduard spent his childhood in Cologne. After graduating from high school in 1910, he accompanied his father on a three-month geographical research expedition to Iceland. He then studied geology, geography, history and German studies at the University of Bonn. In 1911 he moved to Leipzig, where he devoted himself to sinology, general linguistics, cultural history and ethnology. In 1913 he received his doctorate in Leipzig under August Conrady with a thesis on The Calling Back of the Soul (Chao-hun) by Sung Yüh (a poet from the Warring States Period in the 3rd century BC).

From 1912 he worked as a volunteer and from 1913 to 1921 as a research assistant at the Museum of Ethnology in Leipzig . In 1916 he married the graphic artist Anna-Babette Conrady (1894–1986), daughter of his academic teacher. The following year he completed his habilitation at the University of Leipzig was appointed private lecturer in Chinese. He was professionally connected to the Leipzig School of Sinology, which emerged from the tradition of Georg von der Gabelentz and Erkes's teacher and father-in-law August Conrady. In 1919, Erkes joined the SPD and became an atheist.

From 1921 to 1933, Erkes was curator and head of the Asian department of the Ethnological Museum in Leipzig. His appointment as associate professor was initially rejected in 1925; It was not until 1928 that he was appointed non-scheduled associate professor of Chinese.

After the Nazis came to power in 1933, they burned Erkes’s atheistic book Wie Gott erschaffen wurde ("How God Was Created"). Subsequently, Erkes and his wife were banned from working after being denounced by Otto Kümmel. The two were accused of “political unreliability”. Due to the Law for the Restoration of the Professional Civil Service, the Saxon Ministry for National Education withdrew his venia legendi. From 1933 to 1943 Erkes worked as a private scholar in Leipzig. In the last two years of the war he was drafted into service as a bookstore assistant at the Harrassowitz Verlag.

After the end of the war, Erkes was reinstated as curator at the Leipzig Museum of Ethnology in July 1945 and also served as acting director of the museum until 1947. In August 1945 he was appointed adjunct professor, in April 1947 a full-time professor and finally in August 1948 full professor of Chinese studies at the University of Leipzig. As successor of André Wedemeyer, he also took over the management of the East Asian Seminar. He also gave lectures at the Humboldt University of Berlin. After the unification of the SPD and KPD in 1946, he became an active member of the Socialist Unity Party.

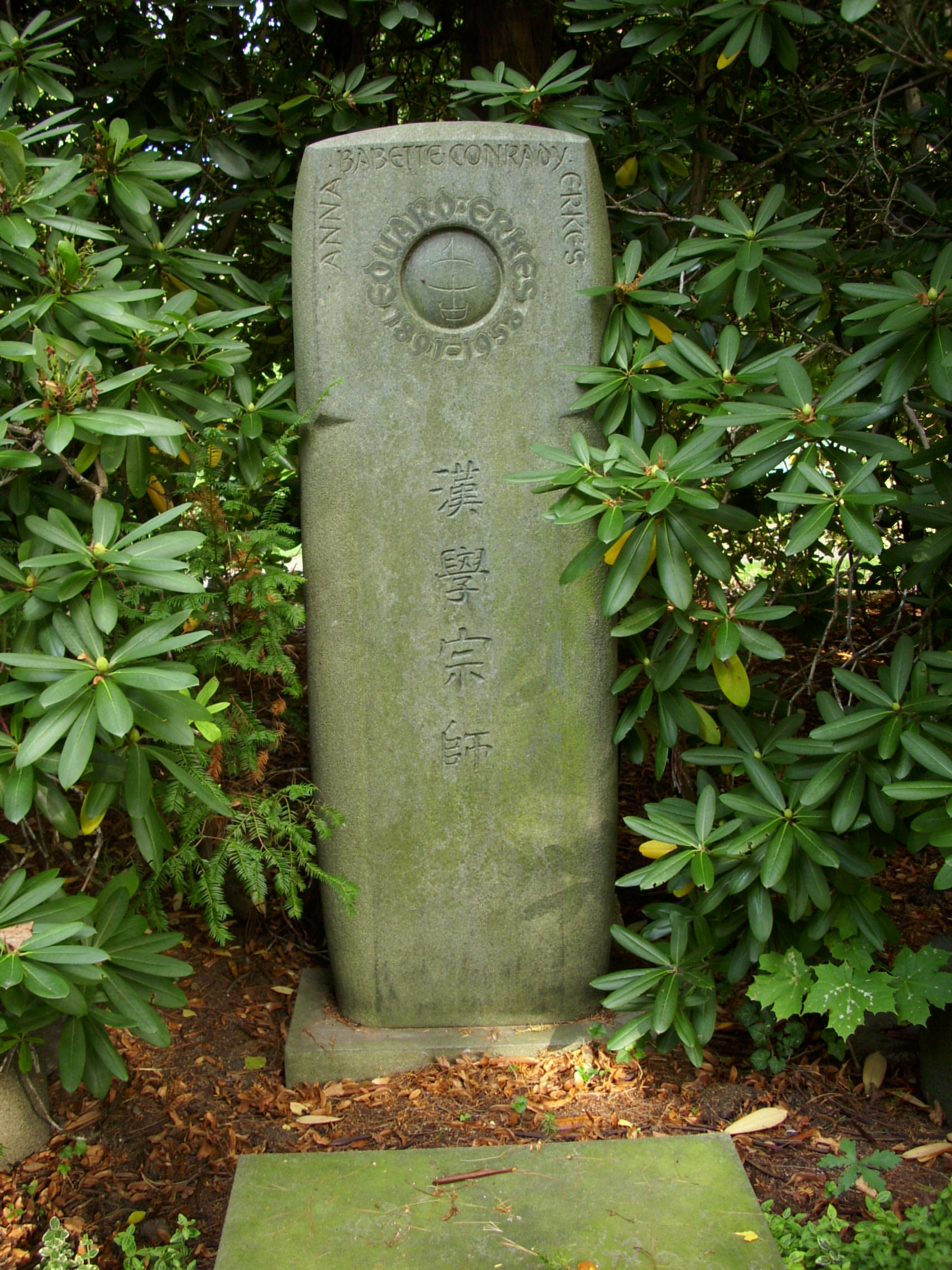
Eduard Erkes's grave in the Leipzig Südfriedhof

From 1950 he was a full member of the Saxon Academy of Sciences. On May 7, 1951, the East Asian Seminar at the University of Leipzig was upgraded to its own East Asian Institute, of which Erkes was director until his death in 1958. At the invitation of the Chinese government, he undertook another study trip to the People's Republic of China in 1954–1955.

Erkes was buried in the Leipzig Südfriedhof.

== Works ==
- Gelber Fluß und Große Mauer. Reise durch Chinas Vergangenheit und Gegenwart. Leipzig, Brockhaus, 1958
- Geschichte Chinas von den Anfängen bis zum Eindringen des ausländischen Kapitals. Berlin, Akademie-Verlag, 1956, ²1957
- Neue Beiträge zur Geschichte des Choukönigs Yu. Berlin, Akademie-Verlag, 1954
- Die Entwicklung der chinesischen Gesellschaft von der Urzeit bis zur Gegenwart. Berlin, Akademie-Verlag, 1953
- Das Problem der Sklaverei in China. Berlin, Akademie-Verlag, 1952
- Der schamanistische Ursprung des chinesischen Ahnenkults. Sinologica 2, 1950
- Die Geschichte Chinas. Berlin, Volk und Wissen, 1948
- China und Europa. Kontrast und Ausgleich zweier Weltkulturen. Leipzig, Volk und Buch, 1947
- Gestaltwandel der Götter in China. Forschungen und Fortschritte 21–23, 1947
- Mystik und Schamanismus, Artibus Asiae 8, 1945
- Das Schwein im alten China. Monumenta Serica 1, Henri Vetch, 1942
- The God of Death in Ancient China. T’oung Pao 25, 1939
- Zur Sage von Shun, T’oung Pao 34, 1939
- Arthur Waley’s Laotse-übersetzung. Hadl, 1935
- Zur ältesten Geschichte des Siegels in China. Gutenberg, 1934
- Spuren chinesischer Wertschöpfungsmythen. T’oung Pao 28, 1931
- Die Götterwelt des alten China. Der Weltkreis 5/6, 1930
- Der Totemismus bei den Chinesen und ihren Stammverwandten. Weule Festschrift, Leipzig 1929
- Chinesisch-Amerikanische Mythen Parallelen. T’oung Pao 24, 1926
- Wie Gott erschaffen wurde. Jena, Urania-Verlags-Gesellschaft, 1925
- Buch und Buchdruck in China. Gutenberg-Festschrift, 1925
- Chinesische Literatur. Breslau, Ferdinand Hirt, 1922
- Chinesen. Leipzig, Dürr & Weber, 1920
- China. Gotha, F. A. Perthes, 1919
- Das Weltbild des Huai-nan-tze. Berlin, Oesterheld, 1918
- Japan und die Japaner. Leipzig, Veit, 1915
- Altchinesische Beschwörungsgedichte. Das "Zurückrufen der Seele" (Chao-Hun) des Sung Yüh. Leipzig, 1914
