= Tegkwitz =

- Village of Starkenberg
- Coat of arms
- Interactive map of Tegkwitz
- Location within Germany Location within Thuringia
- Coordinates: 50°58′47″N 12°20′42″E
- Country: Germany
- State: Thuringia
- District: Altenburger Land
- Town: Starkenberg

Area
  - Total: 4.73 km^{2} (1.83 sq mi)
- Elevation: 190 m (620 ft)

Population (2006-12-31)
  - Total: 328
  - Density: 69.3/km^{2} (180/sq mi)
- Time zone: UTC+01:00 (CET)
  - Summer (DST): UTC+02:00 (CEST)
- Postal codes: 04617
- Dialling codes: 034498
- Vehicle registration: ABG

Tegkwitz is a former municipality in the district Altenburger Land, in Thuringia, Germany. It was incorporated into Starkenberg on 1 December 2008.
