= Naundorf, Thuringia =

Naundorf
- Village of Starkenberg
- Coat of arms
- Interactive map of Naundorf
- Location within Germany Location within Thuringia
- Coordinates: 50°58′7″N 12°16′29″E
- Country: Germany
- State: Thuringia
- District: Altenburger Land
- Town: Starkenberg

Area
  - Total: 10.88 km^{2} (4.20 sq mi)
- Elevation: 240 m (790 ft)

Population (2007-12-31)
  - Total: 510
  - Density: 47/km^{2} (120/sq mi)
- Time zone: UTC+01:00 (CET)
  - Summer (DST): UTC+02:00 (CEST)
- Postal codes: 04617
- Dialling codes: 034495

Naundorf is a village and a former municipality in the district Altenburger Land, in Thuringia, Germany. Since 1 December 2008, it has been part of Starkenberg.
