= Forschungsstelle Deutscher Orden =

Research center in Würzburg, Germany

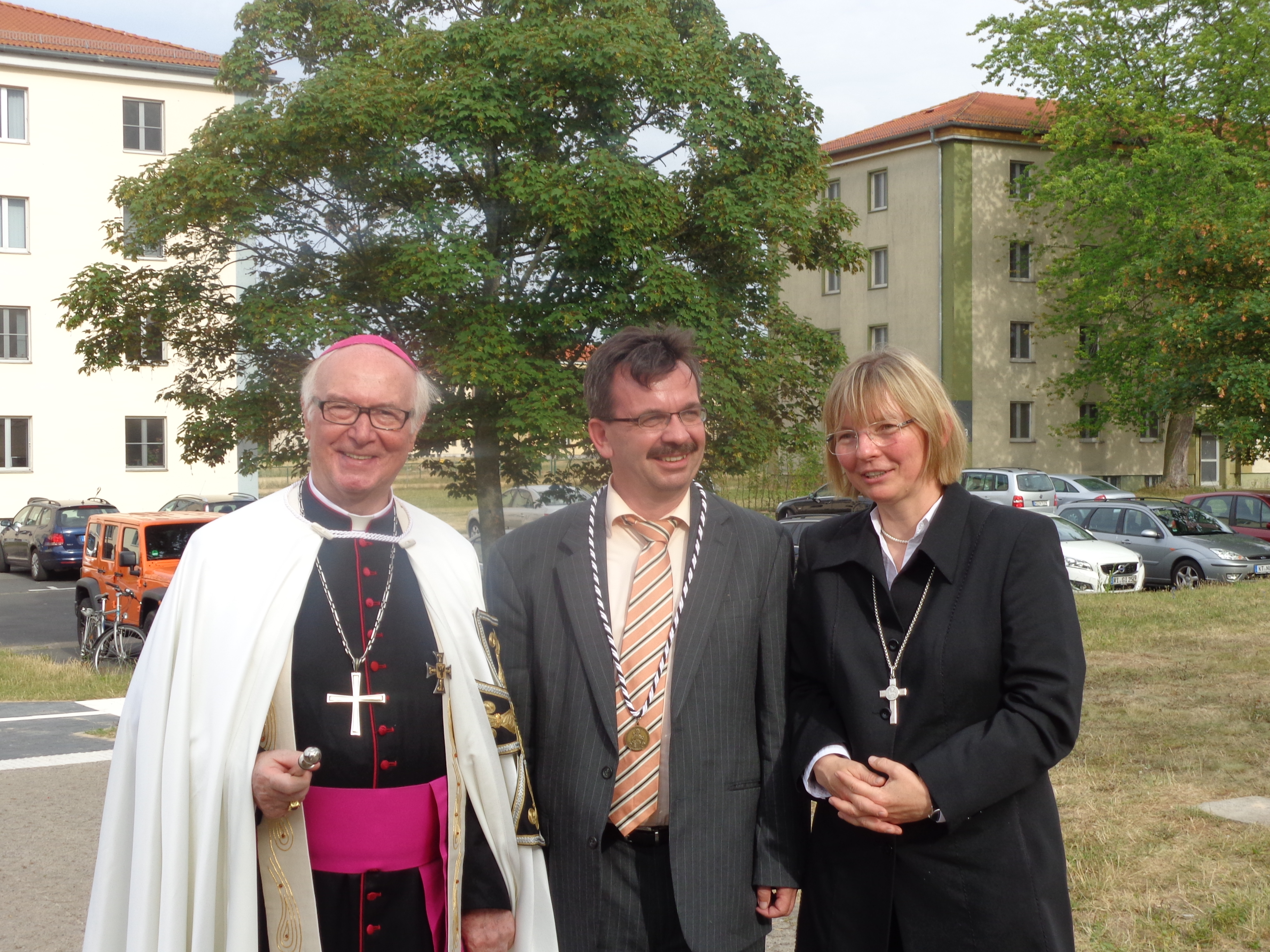
Bruno Platter (Former Grand Master of the Teutonic Order), Prof. Helmut Flachenecker (Director of the Research Centre), and Edda Weise, (Dean of the Protestant Church in Wuerzburg) at the inauguration of the Research Centre.

The Teutonic Order Research Centre (German: Forschungsstelle Deutscher Orden), is a research institution at the Julius-Maximilian University of Würzburg. It is dedicated to the history of the Teutonic Order from 1190 to the present day.

== History and research focus ==
Since its foundation in 2014, the Research Center of the Teutonic Order has been located on the North Campus of the University of Würzburg in the former premises of the US-Leighton-Barracks. Together with the University Archive and the Institute for University History, the research center manages the lecture hall. The renovation costs of €400,000 were covered by the Free State of Bavaria, with additional support coming from the "Deutsche Gesellschaft für Hochschulkunde", "Deutschherrenbund", "Gesellschaft der Freunde und Förderer des Deutschen Ordens St. Mariens in Jerusalem" and the "Dieter-Salch-Stiftung Pro Universitate".

Under the direction of Prof. Dr. Helmut Flachenecker, the research center works on comparative European regional history and the Order's diverse connections to political, religious and cultural history. The research center also serves to network the international research tradition of the Teutonic Order.

== Projects ==
Starting in 2022, the Research Center of the Teutonic Order operates its own portal for the digital publication of research projects. It contains databases on the seals of the Teutonic Order, the Research Center's collection of Crosses and Medals, as well as the Urbaria of the order of the Teutonic Knights. Another part of the portal is the blog, where the Instagram posts of the research center's account are uploaded, and which can be subscribed to as a newsletter.

== Research ==
Finished projects:

- Dr. Youmans, Nicholas: Die Identität des Deutschen Ordens im Spiegel seiner Symbolhandlungen
- Kemmer, Katharina: Der Deutsche Orden in (Stadt)-Prozelten. Kommende, Herrschaftsstruktur, Territorialherrschaft. (Dissertation)
- Dr. Kemmer, Katharina: Unitas per varietatem? - Das mittelalterliche Siegel-Corpus Deutscher Orden. Ein Vergleich der Siegel der Ballei Franken, an der Etsch und im Gebirge, Österreich, Elsass-Burgund, Lothringen und des Deutschmeistertums. (Habilitation)

Current projects:

- Weigand, Benedikt: Der Deutsche Orden und seine Balleien: Ein Vergleich zwischen Elsass-Burgund (Lothringen) und Preußen. (Dissertation)

== Lectures and seminars ==
Since 2012, lectures and seminars on the Teutonic Order have been regularly held at the Julius Maximilian University of Würzburg.

Semester	Lecturer	Title of lecture / seminar	English translation
SS 12	Maike Trentin-Meyer	Die Schlacht von Tannenberg 1410 und der Verlust des Deutschordensterritoriums 1525 - wie stelle ich historische Ereignisse im Museum dar?	The Battle of Tannenberg in 1410 and the loss of the territory of the Teutonic Order in 1525 - how do I depict historical events in the museum?
WS 12/13	Prof. Dr. Dr. h.c. mult. Udo Arnold	Die Geschichte des Deutschen Ordens unter besonderer Berücksichtigung der Ballei Franken	The history of the Teutonic Order with special reference to the Ballei Franken
	Maike Trentin-Meyer	Der Deutsche Orden in Franken - Darstellung im Museum	The Teutonic Order in Franconia - representation in the museum
SS 13	Maike Trentin-Meyer	Die Geschichte des Deutschen Ordens im Museum	The history of the Teutonic Order in the museum
WS 13/14	Stefan Petersen	Der Deutsche Orden in Franken	The Teutonic Order in Franconia
WS 14/15	Jörg Seiler	Der Deutsche Orden in der Neuzeit. Idee und Strukturen einer rechskirchlichen Selbstvergewisserung	The Teutonic Order in Modern Times. Idea and structures of a legal church self-assurance
	Florian Huggenberger	Glaube, Politik, Nächstenliebe, Profit: Der Deutsche Orden in Franken und seinen Nachbargebieten	Faith, politics, charity, profit: the Teutonic Order in Franconia and its neighboring areas
SS 15	Prof. Dr. Roman Czaja	Der Deutsche Orden und seine Territorialherrschaft an der Ostsee	The Teutonic Order and its territorial rule on the Baltic Sea
WS 15/16	John D. Young	Cloistered, Medicant and Military Orders in Franconia and Beyond	Cloistered, Medicant and Military Orders in Franconia and Beyond
SS 16	Prof. Dr. Helmut Flachenecker / Prof. Dr. Caspar Ehlers	Der Deutsche Orden als raumbildender Faktor im Mittelalter	The Teutonic Order as a space-forming factor in the Middle Ages
WS 16/17	Prof. Dr. Arno Mentzel-Reuters / Prof. Dr. Marie-Luise Heckmann	Lektüre von Quellen zu Altpreußen	Reading sources on Old Prussia
SS 17	Prof. Dr. Caspar Ehlers	Ausgewählte Probleme der Mittelalterlichen Geschichte: Eine Karthographie der Balleien des Deutschen Ordensund ihrer Amtsträger bis zur frühen Neuzeit	Selected Problems of Medieval History: A Cartography of the Balleien of the Teutonic Order and their Office Holders up to the Early Modern Age
	Lina Schröder	Herrschaftssicherung mittels infrastruktureller Politik? Der Deutsche Orden in Preußen	Securing power through infrastructural politics? The Teutonic Order in Prussia
WS 17/18	Lina Schröder	Herrschaftssicherung mittels infrastruktureller Politik? Der Deutsche Orden in Preußen	Securing power through infrastructural politics? The Teutonic Order in Prussia
SS 18	Prof. Dr. Helmut Flachenecker / Prof. Dr. Caspar Ehlers	Quellen und Forschungen zur Entstehung der Territorien des Deutschen Ordens	Sources and research on the origin of the territories of the Teutonic Order
WS 18/19	Benjamin Heidenreich	Der Deutsche Orden in der Frühen Neuzeit	The Teutonic Order in the Early Modern Age
SS 19	Benjamin Heidenreich	Der Deutsche Orden in der Frühen Neuzeit	The Teutonic Order in the Early Modern Age
	Katharina Kemmer	Die Geschichte des Deutschen Ordens im Mittelalter	The history of the Teutonic Order in the Middle Ages
WS 19/20	Katharina Kemmer	Einführung in die Sphragistik - Siegel des Deutschen Ordens	Introduction to Sphragistics - Seals of the Teutonic Order
SS 20	Helmut Flachenecker	Die Ritterorden in Franken	The orders of knights in Franconia
	Katharina Kemmer	Mythos und Wahrheit - Der Deutsche Orden	Myth and Truth - The Teutonic Order
WS 20/21	Katharina Kemmer	Staufer und Deutscher Orden in Apulien	The Hohenstaufen and the Teutonic Order in Apulia
SS 21	Katharina Kemmer	Der Deutsche Orden in Franken	The Teutonic Order in Franconia
WS 21/22	Katharina Kemmer	Der Deutsche Orden im Mittelalter	The Teutonic Order in the Middle Ages
	Aurelia Brandenburg	Der Deutsche Orden im digitalen Spiel	The Teutonic Order in the digital game
SS 22	Katharina Kemmer	Von Templern, Johannitern und Deutschem Orden	Of Templars, Knights of St. John and the Teutonic Order
WS 22/23	Katharina Kemmer	Primus inter Pares? – Der Deutsche Orden als geistlicher Landesherr im Reich und Ostmittel-Europa	Primus inter Pares? - The Teutonic Order as a spiritual sovereign in the Empire and East-Central Europe
SS 23	Katharina Kemmer	Mittler zwischen Welten? – Der Deutsche Orden, Sacerdotium und Imperium	Mediator between worlds? - The Teutonic Order, Sacerdotium and Imperium
	Benedikt Weigand	Der Deutsche Orden in seinen Regionen	The Teutonic Order in its regions
WS 23/24	Helmut Flachenecker	Dichtung und Wahrheit? Fränkische Historiographen in fürstlichen Diensten: Lorenz Fries und Gregor Spieß	Fiction and truth? Franconian historiographers in the service of princes: Lorenz Fries and Gregor Spieß
	Katharina Kemmer	Der Deutsche Orden in Ostmitteleuropa	The Teutonic Order in East Central Europe
SS 24	Katharina Kemmer	Zeiten der Umbrüche und Krisen – Der Deutsche Orden ab der Frühen Neuzeit	Times of upheaval and crisis - The Teutonic Order in the early modern period
	Katharina Kemmer	Der Deutsche Orden im Mittelmeerraum	The Teutonic Order in the Mediterranean
Ws 24/25	Katharina Kemmer	Der Deutsche Orden im mittelalterlichen Europa	The Teutonic Order in medieval Europe

== Library ==
The research center houses a sub-library with a focus on the Teutonic Order and also manages the library of the Commission for East and West Prussian Regional Research.

Collections of the library:

- Archival copies of the Teutonic Order, the Knights of St. John and from the holdings of Prof. Dr. Jürgen Sarnowsky which are listed in a finding aid.
- Copies of seals from the collection of Hans-Georg Boehm (Bad Mergentheim)
- Photo library from the image collection of the International Commission for the Study of the Teutonic Order

== Conferences ==
The Research Centre of the Teutonic Order is a regular (co-)organizer of conferences:

- 2024: Deutscher Orden und Bauernkrieg 1525
- 2022: Deutschordensballeien im Südosten - Internationale Tagung
- 2021: Partes inferiores? Die Deutschordensballeien Utrecht, Biesen, Westfalen und Sachsen in der Frühen Neuzeit – Internationale Tagung
- 2019:
  - Maria, Georg und Elisabeth. Der Deutsche Orden von Akkon nach Franken – Internationale Tagung
  - Der Hochmeisterpalast auf der Marienburg, Vortrag von Professor Christofer Hermann im Toscanasaal der Residenz Würzburg
  - Jahresinvestitur des Familiareninstituts des Deutschen Ordens: Ausrichtung eines Symposiums
- 2018: Der Deutsche Orden und das Konzil von Konstanz – Internationale Tagung
- 2017:
  - Siegel des Deutschen Ordens – Internationaler Workshop
  - Quelleneditionen zur Geschichte des Deutschen Ordens und anderer geistlicher Institutionen – Internationale Tagung
- 2016: Globale und regionale Aspekte in der Entwicklung des Deutschen Ordens – Tagung der Internationalen Historischen Kommission zur Erforschung des Deutschen Ordens

== Excursions ==
Since 2015, the FDO (also in cooperation with various chairs of the Julius Maximilians University) has organized excursions in the footsteps of the Teutonic Order.

- 2015: Auf den Spuren des Deutschen Ordens ins Polen (Poland)
- 2017: Auf den Spuren des Deutschen Ordens in Belgien und den Niederlanden (Belgium and the Netherlands)
- 2019: Auf den Spuren des Deutschen Ordens im Gebiet Kaliningrad (Russia)
- 2021: Stauferherrschaft und Deutscher Orden in Apulien (Italy)

== Cooperations ==
- Hochmeisteramt des Deutschen Ordens in Wien
- Deutschordenszentralarchiv Wien
- Deutschherrenbund
- Internationale Historsiche Kommission zur Erforschung des Deutschen Ordens
- Historische Komission für ost- und westpreußische Landesforschung
- Centro interdipartimentale di ricerca sull'Ordine Teutonico nel Mediterraneo
- Max-Planck-Institut für Rechtsgeschichte und Rechtstheorie
- Deutschordensmuseum - Residenzschloss Mergentheim
- Staatsarchiv Ludwigsburg
- Familiarengemeinschaft der Ballei Deutschland

== Publications ==
The research and conference proceedings of the Research Center are published in the series “Publications of the Research Center of the Teutonic Order at the University of Würzburg” as a sub-series of “Sources and Studies on the History of the Teutonic Order”. A list of publications can be found on the research center's website.

Excerpt of publications:

- Alice Ehrmann-Pösch, Bettler, Pfründner, Hausarme. Armenfürsorge in der Frühen Neuzeit am Beispiel Mergentheim, Residenzstadt des Deutschen Ordens (Quellen und Studien zur Geschichte des Deutschen Ordens 89 = Veröffentlichungen der Forschungsstelle Deutscher Orden an der Universität Würzburg 5), Ilmtal-Weinstraße 2022.
- Helmut Flachenecker (Hrsg.), Kommendenausbau im Hl. Römischen Reich des 13. Jahrhunderts. Italien, Franken, Preußen und Livland in vergleichender Perspektive (Quellen und Studien zur Geschichte des Deutschen Ordens 88 = Veröffentlichungen der Forschungsstelle Deutscher Orden an der Universität Würzburg 4), Ilmtal-Weinstraße 2022.
- Katharina Kemmer, Der Deutsche Orden in Prozelten: Kommende, Herrschaftsstruktur und Territorialherrschaft (Quellen und Studien zur Geschichte des Deutschen Ordens 83 = Veröffentlichungen der Forschungsstelle Deutscher Orden an der Universität Würzburg 3), Weimar 2020.
- Helmut Flachenecker (Hrsg.), Der Deutsche Orden auf dem Konstanzer Konzil: Pläne - Strategien - Erwartungen. (Quellen und Studien zur Geschichte des Deutschen Ordens 84 = Veröffentlichungen der Forschungsstelle Deutscher Orden an der Universität Würzburg 2), Weimar 2020.
