= Starkenberg =

- Municipality
- Coat of arms

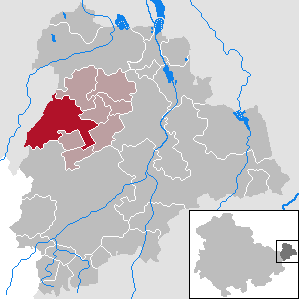
- Location of Starkenberg within Altenburger Land district
- Interactive map of Starkenberg
- Location within Germany Location within Thuringia
- Coordinates: 50°59′5″N 12°18′45″E
- Country: Germany
- State: Thuringia
- District: Altenburger Land
- Municipal assoc.: Rositz
- Subdivisions: 4 Ortsteile

Government
  - Mayor (2022–28): Andreas Zetsche

Area
  - Total: 26.33 km^{2} (10.17 sq mi)
- Elevation: 235 m (771 ft)

Population (2025-12-31)
  - Total: 1,692
  - Density: 64.26/km^{2} (166.4/sq mi)
- Time zone: UTC+01:00 (CET)
  - Summer (DST): UTC+02:00 (CEST)
- Postal codes: 04617
- Dialling codes: 03448
- Vehicle registration: ABG
- Website: www.starkenberg.info

Starkenberg is a municipality in the district Altenburger Land, in Thuringia, Germany. On 1 December 2008, it incorporated the former municipalities Naundorf and Tegkwitz.

== History ==
Within the German Empire (1871–1918), Starkenberg was part of the Duchy of Saxe-Altenburg.
