= University of Würzburg =

University in Germany

- Julius-Maximilians-Universität Würzburg
- Seal of the Julius Maximilian University of Würzburg
- Motto: Veritati
- Motto in English: Truth. Knowledge. Change. Since 1402
- Type: Public
- Established: 1402; 624 years ago (closed 1415–1582)
- Affiliations: U15; Coimbra Group
- Budget: € 795.0 million
- Chancellor: Uwe Klug
- President: Paul Pauli
- Total staff: 5,100
- Students: 25,281
- Location: Würzburg, Bavaria, Germany; 49°47′17″N 9°56′07″E
- Campus: Urban
- Colours: Blue and White
- Website: uni-wuerzburg.de
- Location within Germany Location within Bavaria
- University of Würzburg

The Julius Maximilian University of Würzburg (also referred to as the University of Würzburg; German: Julius-Maximilians-Universität Würzburg) is a public research university in Würzburg, Germany. Founded in 1402, it is one of the oldest institutions of higher learning in Germany. The university initially had a brief run and was closed in 1415. It was reopened in 1582 on the initiative of Julius Echter von Mespelbrunn. Today, the university is named for Julius Echter von Mespelbrunn and Maximilian Joseph.

The University of Würzburg is part of the U15 group of research-intensive German universities. The university is also a member of the Coimbra Group. In the winter semester 2025/2026, 25,281 students are enrolled, of which 15,489 are women, 3,078 are international students and 2,919 are first semester university students. 15 Nobel laureates have been affiliated with the university.

== Name ==
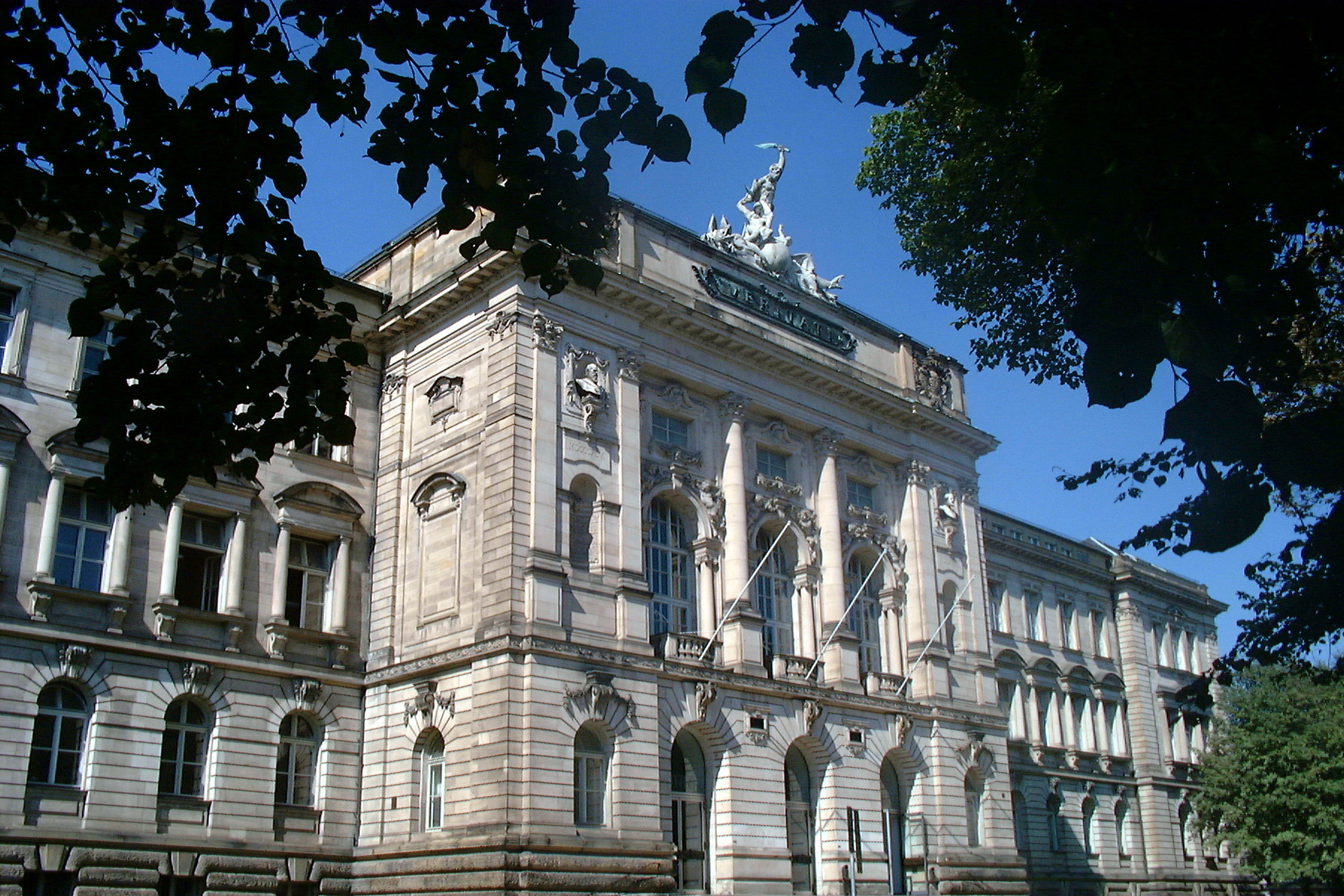
Neue Universität main building, built in 1896

Its official name is Julius-Maximilians-Universität Würzburg (or "Julius-Maximilian University of Würzburg") but it is commonly referred to as the University of Würzburg. This name is taken from Julius Echter von Mespelbrunn, Prince-Bishop of Würzburg, who reestablished the university in 1582, and Prince Elector Maximilian Joseph, the prince under whom secularization occurred at the start of the 19th century. The university's central administration, foreign student office, and several research institutes are located within the area of the old town, while the new liberal arts campus, with its modern library, overlooks the city from the east. The university today enrolls approximately 25,000 students, out of which more than 3,000 are international students.

== History ==
=== First founding in 1402 ===
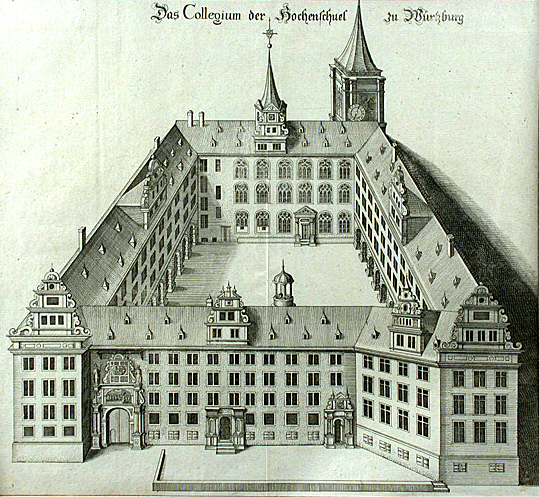
Old University, drawing from the 17th or 18th century

The university was founded as the "High School of Würzburg" on an initiative started in 1401 by Prince Bishop Johann von Egloffstein. He wanted to transform the "Gymnasium herbipolense" into a university with four faculties hoping that an influx of teaching staff and students in his territory would cover the need for qualified lawyers and clerics and thus lead to an upturn in the city's economy. He bought the buildings needed for teaching from members of his cathedral chapter.

On 10 December 1402, he was granted the required privilege from Pope Boniface IX. This put Würzburg among the cities with the oldest universities in the then German-speaking area – Prague (1348), Vienna (1365), Heidelberg (1386), Cologne (1388) and Erfurt (1392), and made Würzburg the oldest university in Bavaria. Among the teachers at the university were Winand von Steeg, Johannes Ambundi and Bartholomäus Fröwein.

Already before 1430, however, teaching was suspended shortly after the death of Prince Bishop von Egloffstein. The reason for the decline was primarily the lack of funding, since it had not been possible to establish a foundation that had its own benefice. On 30 November 1413, the rector of the university, Johann Zantfurt, was murdered by his valet; the circumstances were never clarified. Later, Lorenz Fries bought the university building. In 1427, the "Hohe Schule" was mentioned for the last time in a document. By that time, it had not been dissolved yet, but had become insignificant. Friedrich von Wirsberg, who became prince-bishop in 1558, was the first to consider rebuilding the university. Due to problems with the clergy and administration, however, he was unable to realize his plans

=== From re-founding in 1582 to 1945 ===
After classes had been resumed in some of the subjects in 1551 and the first doctorates had already been awarded in 1567, the Würzburg Prince-Bishop Julius Echter von Mespelbrunn, during the Counter-Reformation, in 1575, first obtained the imperial and then, in 1576, the papal privileges to re-establish the university (see also Erasmus Neustetter called Stürmer). This time, financing was better ensured, and student regulations were stricter. On 2 January 1582, first the theological and philosophical faculties were reopened, and their deans appointed. The name of the university was "Academia Iulia" (Julius University). The university seal was not created until the following year, and thus bears the year 1583. Statutes for the medical faculty were drawn up in 1587. Although the number of lecturers was not complete until 1593, the first medical student, Georg Leyerer from Ebersbrunn, was already enrolled on 2 October 1585.

In 1591, the four-winged university building and the associated church (Neubaukirche) in one of its angles, both commissioned by Julius Echter, were completed. It seems certain that the architect of the building was Georg Robin. Theologians, lawyers and humanities scholars were accommodated in this complex which today is called "Alte Universität". The medical faculty found its home in Juliusspital.

Initially, the university was only open to Catholic students. In 1734, Prince Bishop Friedrich Karl von Schönborn issued new study regulations which opened it up to non-Catholics, too. First, theology in Würzburg was determined by Jesuits. But in 1773, the Würzburg Jesuit College was dissolved, and Adam Friedrich von Seinsheim hired followers of the Enlightenment for the theological faculty and thus laid the foundation for its future orientation. From then on, and especially under his successor Franz Ludwig von Erthal, Enlightenment theologians became increasingly active in Würzburg. Nevertheless, it was only in the early 19th century, after Würzburg had come under Bavarian rule, that the university gave up its ecclesiastical-Catholic character.

The modern development of medical subjects began in the 18th century with the establishment of the medical clinic – in 1767, the "internist" and chemist Franz Heinrich Meinolf Wilhelm became the first head of the Juliusspital hospital. The surgical university clinic was established in 1769 under Carl Caspar von Siebold. In 1796, the physician and court medicus Anton Müller (1755–1827) began working at Juliusspital in Würzburg; although he never belonged to the university, he became the first psychiatrist in the hospital and the first to publish on his specialty. Franz Heinrich Meinolf Wilhelm, who as a professor held lectures in German for the first time from 1785, was the first to practice experimental chemistry at the University of Würzburg.

==== 19th century onwards ====
Around 1800, the first student associations were founded in Würzburg. The Scientific dentistry in Würzburg began with the appointment of Carl Joseph Ringelmann as professor in 1807. In 1822, a faculty of political science was established at the university.

During the coalition wars, the university was renamed several times: First "Churfürstliche Julius-Universität" (1803), "Julius Maximilians Universität" (1803/04–1805/06), then "Kurfürstliche Universität zu Würzburg" (1806–1806/07), "Großherzogliche Universität zu Würzburg" (1807–1814), and finally "Königliche Universität zu Würzburg" (1815–1838). The names reflected the different affiliations of the university to the Electorate of Bavaria, which perished in 1806, to the Grand Duchy of Würzburg, which existed as a Rhineland state until 1814, and then to the Kingdom of Bavaria.

In the winter semester of 1838/39, the "Königliche Universität zu Würzburg" was renamed "Königliche Julius-Maximilians-Universität" and two years later "Königlich Bayerische Julius-Maximilians-Universität" which was to be its name for almost 80 years.

After 1850, the university experienced a strong upswing. Numerous new buildings were created: for medicine in the vicinity of Juliusspital and Pleicherwall, for the natural sciences on today's Röntgenring and on Koellikerstraße, for dentistry at Pleichertor (demolished in 1879), and for the mental hospital on Schalksberg. Basic medical subjects were taught and researched in the "Kollegienhaus", which was completed in 1853 and was the first modern "biocentre" in Germany. The first full professor of ophthalmology, appointed in 1866 by the Bavarian king, was Robert Ritter von Welz, a student of Albrecht von Graefe.

In 1857, the doctor, who had been teaching ophthalmology and dentistry in Würzburg since 1850, opened a private eye clinic in the former birthing house of Adam Elias von Siebold on Klinikstraße 6. On 4 January 1858, he acquired the building, which was donated by the Welzsche Marienstiftung for Poor People with Eye Diseases according to Welz' will in 1878 and became the first Würzburg university eye clinic. The former delivery house, which had been founded in 1805 as the first maternity clinic in Würzburg and a training center for midwives and obstetricians, in 1857, under Friedrich Wilhelm Scanzoni von Lichtenfels, moved to a new building on Klinikstraße 8. As an assistant to the surgeon Cajetan von Textor, Robert von Welz was also one of the pioneers of ether anesthesia in the German-speaking world. He developed an inhaler and, after testing it on himself and others in the winter of 1846/47, published the first work on it, and thus established modern anesthesiology in Würzburg.

In the winter semester of 1876/77, the number of students at the University of Würzburg exceeded 1,000 for the first time. In 1888, the university, whose medical faculty was one of the most important after Vienna and Prague between 1850 and 1880, received its own pharmaceutical institute.

On 28 October 1896, a new main building, called "Neue Universität", was inaugurated on Sanderring (its construction began in 1892); it is still the seat of the university management today.

On 3 June 1896, Marcella O'Grady Boveri was the first woman to be admitted to the Würzburg Medical Faculty. The first woman to habilitate at the University of Würzburg was the psychologist Maria Schorn in 1929.

A new eye clinic was opened on Röntgenring 12 in 1901, with the portrait of Welz engraved over the portal. Welzhaus on Klinikstraße 6 was affiliated to the women's clinic on Klinikstraße 8, which existed there until 1934, and connected to it by a corridor on the first floor, which was destroyed in World War II and restored in 1974. Welzhaus which was also destroyed except for its outer façade on 16 March 1945, was rebuilt in 1953/1954. The Mathematical Institute was accommodated there until 1974, when the building was affiliated to the Medical Polyclinic.

Between 1901 and 1911, five Würzburg researchers, whose appointment was mainly due to the mathematician Friedrich Prym (dean and rector), were awarded Nobel Prizes. This strongly contributed to the international importance of the University of Würzburg, particularly of its philosophical faculty.

After the November Revolution of 1918/19, which ended monarchy in Bavaria, the university also lost its title "Königlich Bayerisch" and was given its current name: "Julius-Maximilians-Universität".

The medical faculty separated from Juliusspital and in 1921 moved to the new University Hospital of Würzburg on the outskirts of the city. It was called "Luitpold Krankenhaus". The State Luitpold Hospital was solemnly handed over on 2 November 1921, and within one year the various clinics moved into it. By the summer semester that year, the proportion of students enrolled in medicine had risen to 60 percent.

In 1934, under its director Carl Joseph Gauss, the university women's clinic and the affiliated midwifery school moved from Welzhaus on Klinikstraße to the Grombühl district.

An Institute for Genetics and Race Research was set up in Welzhaus on Klinikstraße 6 in November 1938 and inaugurated in May 1939.

Between 1933 and 1945, the University of Würzburg deprived 184 scientists of their doctoral degrees. Above all, scientists of Jewish origin were thus degraded. After the critical processing of these events in 2010, the university posthumously rehabilitated these researchers in a public ceremony in May 2011.

=== Post War period ===
After the Second World War, the faculty of theology was the first to start anew on 1 October 1945. The faculty of medicine (dean: Jürg Zutt) followed; it was officially reopened with the constitutive faculty meeting on 11 January 1947, and began its lectures in the winter semester of 1946 /47. On 12 March 1947, the university was solemnly reopened.

According to a report by rector Josef Martin (philologist), the military government had dismissed 123 of the 150 professors who had worked before 1945 and only allowed 27 back to lecture at the university.

In 1955, Julius Büdel significantly developed Africa Research in Würzburg. It was mainly due to the results of Büdel's and Horst Mensching's research trips, that Würzburg had become an important center for geographical research on Africa by the late 1970s.

On 11 May 1965, the university laid the foundation stone for the new Hubland Campus on a hill in the east of Würzburg. The 111-hectare (270-acre) site had been acquired by the Free State of Bavaria from the city of Würzburg in 1962 already, to make room for the more than 6,000 students enrolled at Alma Julia. In the years that followed, numerous new buildings were put up there, among them the chemistry center (from 1965 to 1972 the rooms for organic chemistry, pharmacy and food chemistry, inorganic chemistry and a central building were set up), the philosophy building, the university library, the biocentre (1992), sports facilities, buildings for physics, mathematics and computer science, a computer centre, a new canteen and student residences. In 2011, the central lecture hall and seminar building for all faculties (Z6) was inaugurated on Hubland campus, as well as a new internship building for the natural sciences.

Starting from the existing Surgical Clinic (head: Ernst Kern), new subjects, departments and clinics developed in the seventies: in 1970, the Urological University Clinic (Hubert Frohmüller); in 1978, the Department for Special Thoracic Surgery (Associate Professor H. J. Viereck), the Department for Surgical X-ray Diagnostics (Extraordinarius G. Viehweger), and the Department for Transfusion Medicine and Immunohematology (Extraordinarius D. Wiebecke). Furthermore, on 16 June 1969, the first Bavarian chair for anesthesiology was established in the medical faculty, headed by his professor Karl-Heinz Weis (* 1927). Weis had already been in charge of the anesthesiology department since 1966 when Werner Wachsmuth was head of the surgical clinic. The former Chair for Genetic Science and Race Research, which Gebsattel had taken over, was renamed the Chair for Medical Psychology and Psychotherapy in 1965 and was filled by Dieter Wyss in 1968. In 1979, Holger Höhn was appointed to the Institute for Human Genetics, which had emerged from this chair. In 1978 the Institute for X-ray Diagnostics was established in the Medical Clinic under Extraordinarius H. Braun.

In 1973, over 10,000 students were enrolled at the University of Würzburg, and the former conservatory became a university of music. In 1981, the University Library of Würzburg moved into its new building on Hubland.

On 31 January 1983, a poisoned drink attack was carried out at the university. The drinks, which were mixed with thallium(I) sulfate, were put in front of a lecture hall together with a note declaring them as leftovers from a carnival party and donating them to the freshmen. The medical student Robert A. died as a result of the poisoning; eleven other students had to be treated in the hospital; the law student Peter S. sustained lasting damage. The perpetrator could never be identified.

On 12 April 2011, the university opened its new Campus North, right next to Hubland campus: An additional site of 39 hectares is now available for the future development of the university. Campus North used to be a US military base (Leighton Barracks). After the Americans withdrew in January 2009, the university had the opportunity to use part of the former barracks for itself. This conversion from military to civilian area made rapid progress, and the campus canteen was inaugurated in 2014.

== Miscellaneous ==
The tower of Neubaukirche (university auditorium), with its height of 91 meters the city's tallest church tower, has one of the four carillons in Bavaria. Between Easter and Christmas, public concerts of about 30 minutes are given on it every Wednesday at 5:30 p.m.

In March 2016, JMU was the first university in Bavaria to be awarded the "Bavaria barrier-free" signet. The award was given for the removal of structural barriers, especially in new buildings, and for the establishment of the Information Center for People with Disabilities and Chronic Diseases (KIS), created in 2008.

On 7 January 2019, the online portal WueStudy of the University of Würzburg was launched after a lengthy planning and processing phase. It replaces the former sb@home portal and uses the HISinOne software developed by the Hochschul-Informations-System.

== The university and the city ==
Today, around 28,000 students are enrolled at the university. In addition, there are more than 8,600 students at the University of Applied Sciences Würzburg-Schweinfurt, founded on 1 August 1971, and around 750 students at the University of Music. Thus, every fourth citizen of Würzburg is a student.

With a total of more than 10,000 employees, the university and its hospital are among the largest employers in the region.

Due to the university's history, its institutes and hospitals are spread over the entire city. Facilities are found in the following places, among others:

- Dallenberg: Botany with Botanical Garden, Pharmaceutical Biology,
- Grombühl: Medicine, university hospitals, Rudolf Virchow Center – Center for Integrative and Translational Bioimaging,
- Hubland with Campus South and Campus North (on the site of the former Leighton Barracks): University Library, Computer Center, Biocentre, the faculties and institutes of German, English, Romance Language and Literature, History, Art History, Chemistry, Pharmacy, Food Chemistry, Physics, Astronomy, Geography, Geology, Mathematics, Computer Science, Parts of Education, the New Sports Center, the Robotics Hall, the Nanostructure Laboratory, and the Mineralogical Museum,
- Wittelsbacherplatz: Sociology, Political Science, Education, Special Education,
- Neue Universität (Sanderring): University management, Economics,
- Residence: Classical Philology, Egyptology, Oriental Studies, Philosophy, Ancient History, Prehistory and Early History, Classical Archaeology,
- Domerschulstraße, Alte Universität: Law; Domerschulstraße 13: Institute for Music Research,
- Bibrastraße 14: Catholic Theology,
- City center and Pleich: Dentistry; Dental, Oral and Maxillofacial Clinics of the University Hospital Würzburg,
- Röntgenring (until 1909 "Pleicher Ring"): Anatomy, Physiology, Psychology, Chemical Technology of Material Synthesis,
- Versbacher Straße: Pharmacology, Toxicology, Virology, Immunobiology, Medical Radiology,
- Judenbühlweg: Sports Center.

== Research institutions ==
- Comprehensive Heart Failure Center (DZHI)
- Institute for Higher Education (IfH)
- Adolf Würth Center for the History of Psychology (AWZ)
- Mineralogical Museum Würzburg
- Institute for Molecular Infection Biology (IMIB)
- Martin von Wagner Museum (MvW)
- Rudolf Virchow Center for Integrative and Translational Bioimaging (RVZ)
- Theodor Boveri Institute for Biosciences
- Center for Experimental Molecular Medicine (ZEMM)
- Research Center for Infectious Diseases (ZINF)
- Helmholtz Center for Infection Research (HIRI)
- Max Planck Research Group for System Immunology (WÜSI)
- Bavarian Center for Applied Energy Research (ZAE)
- Interdisciplinary Bank of Biomaterials and Data Würzburg (ibdw)
- Forschungsstelle Deutscher Orden

== Campus ==
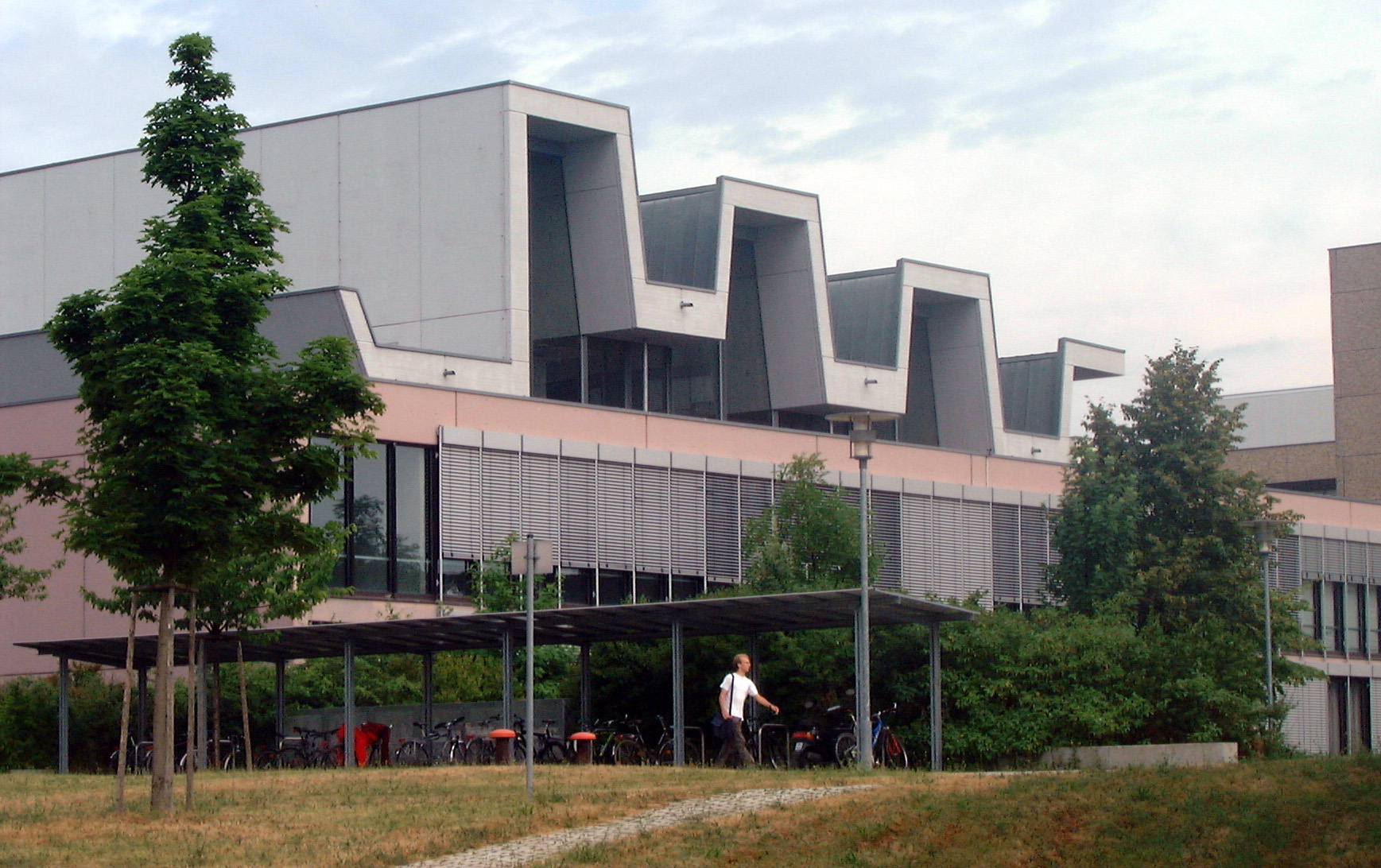
Lecture Hall for Natural Sciences

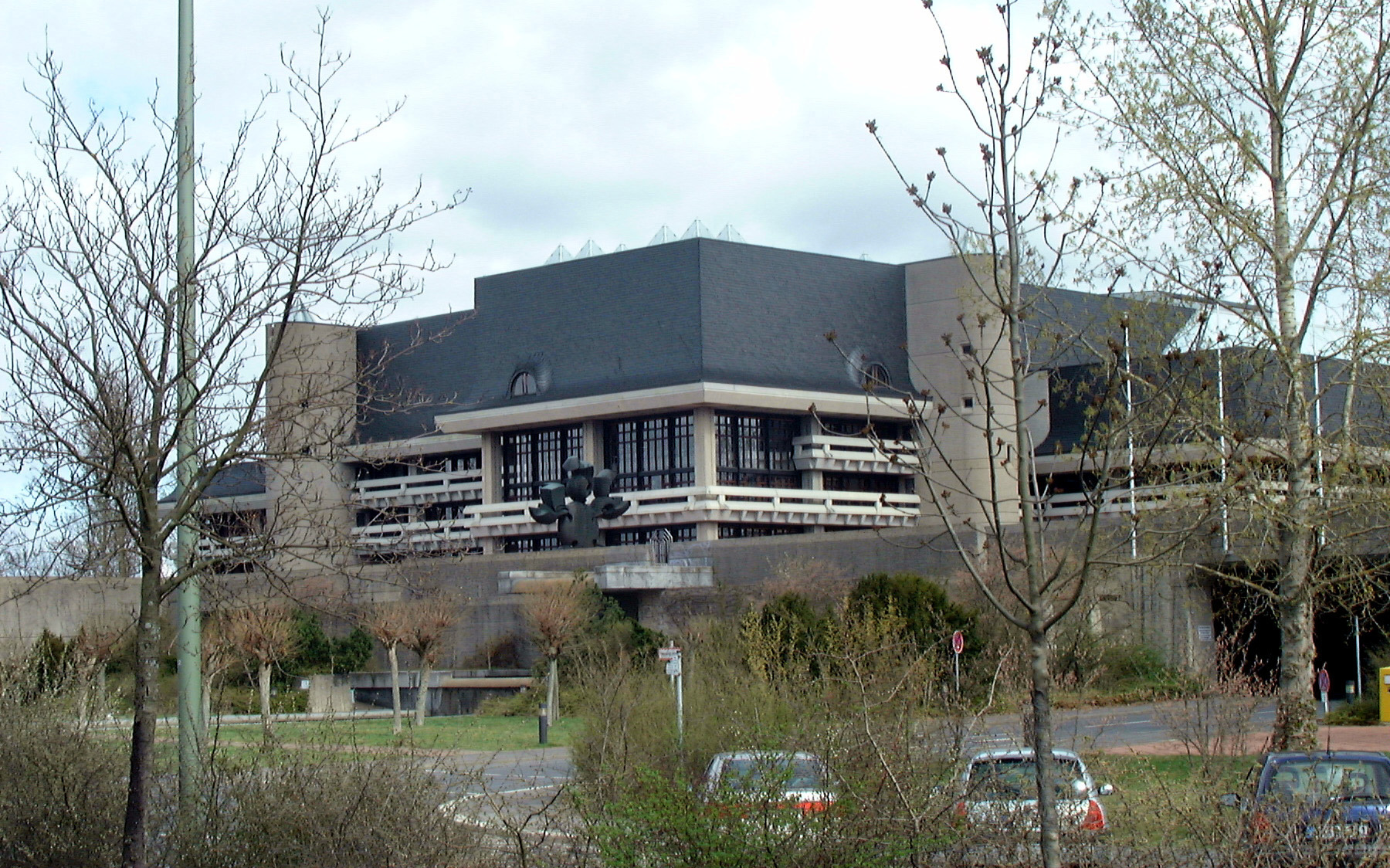
Central University Library

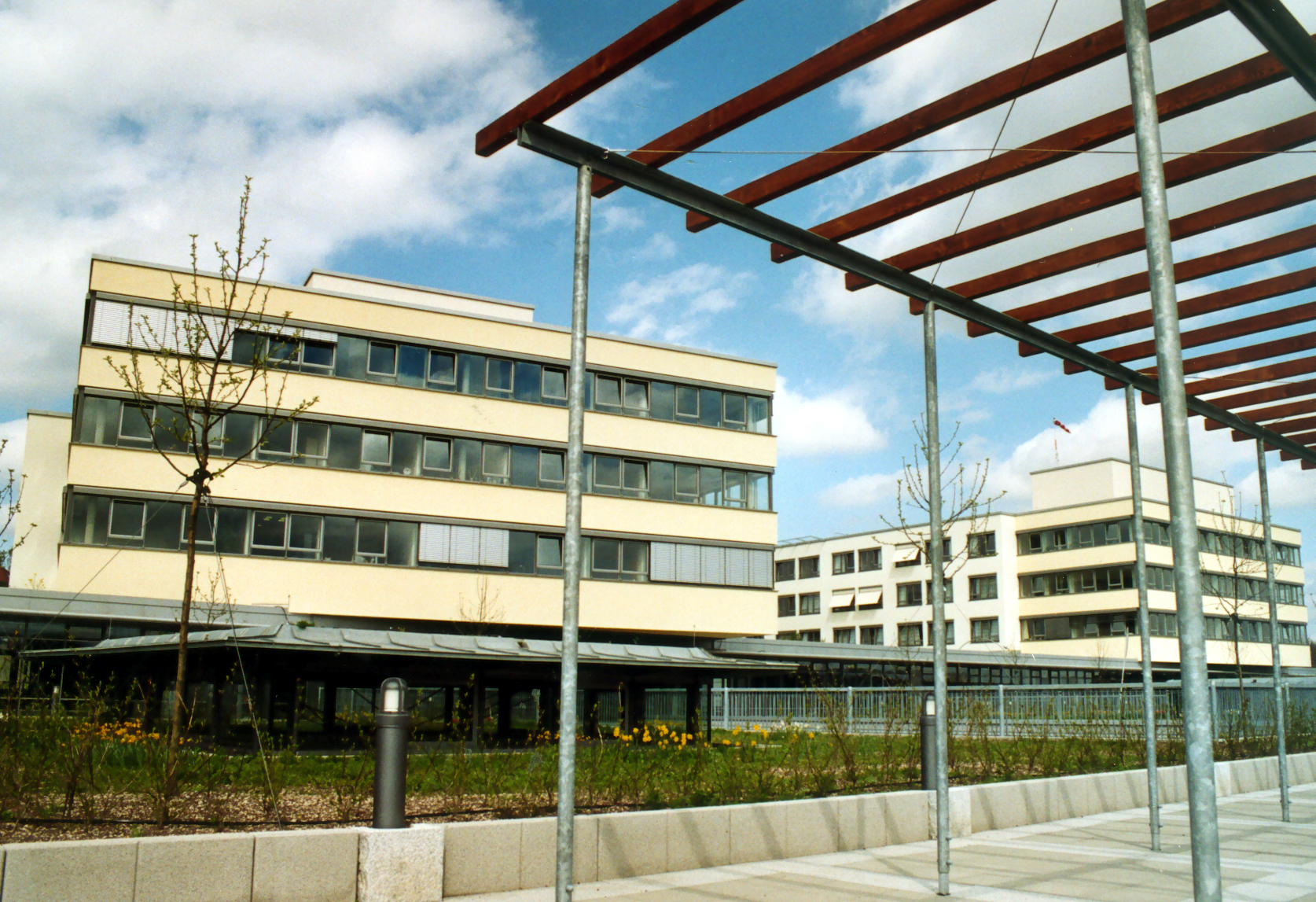
Center of Operative Medicine

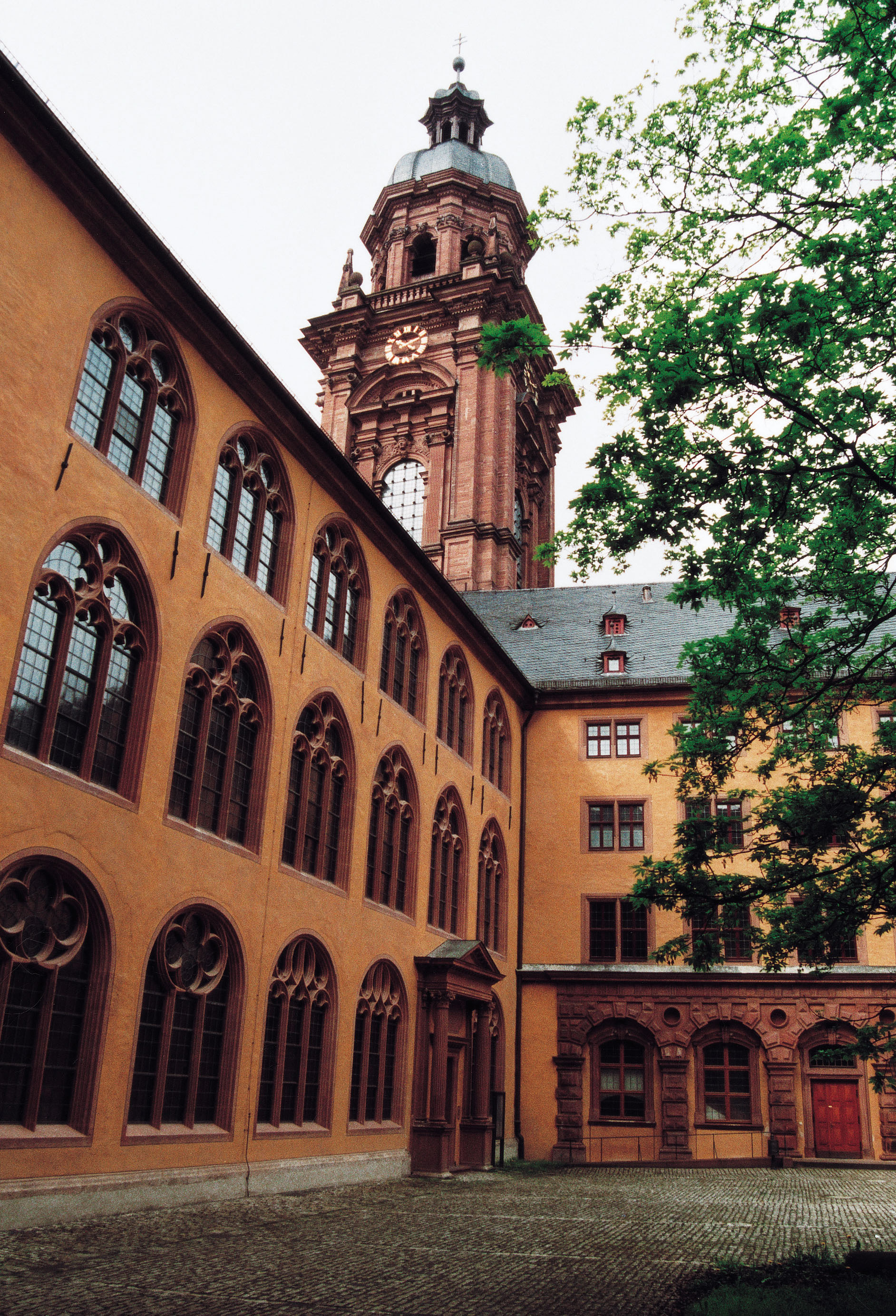
Old University

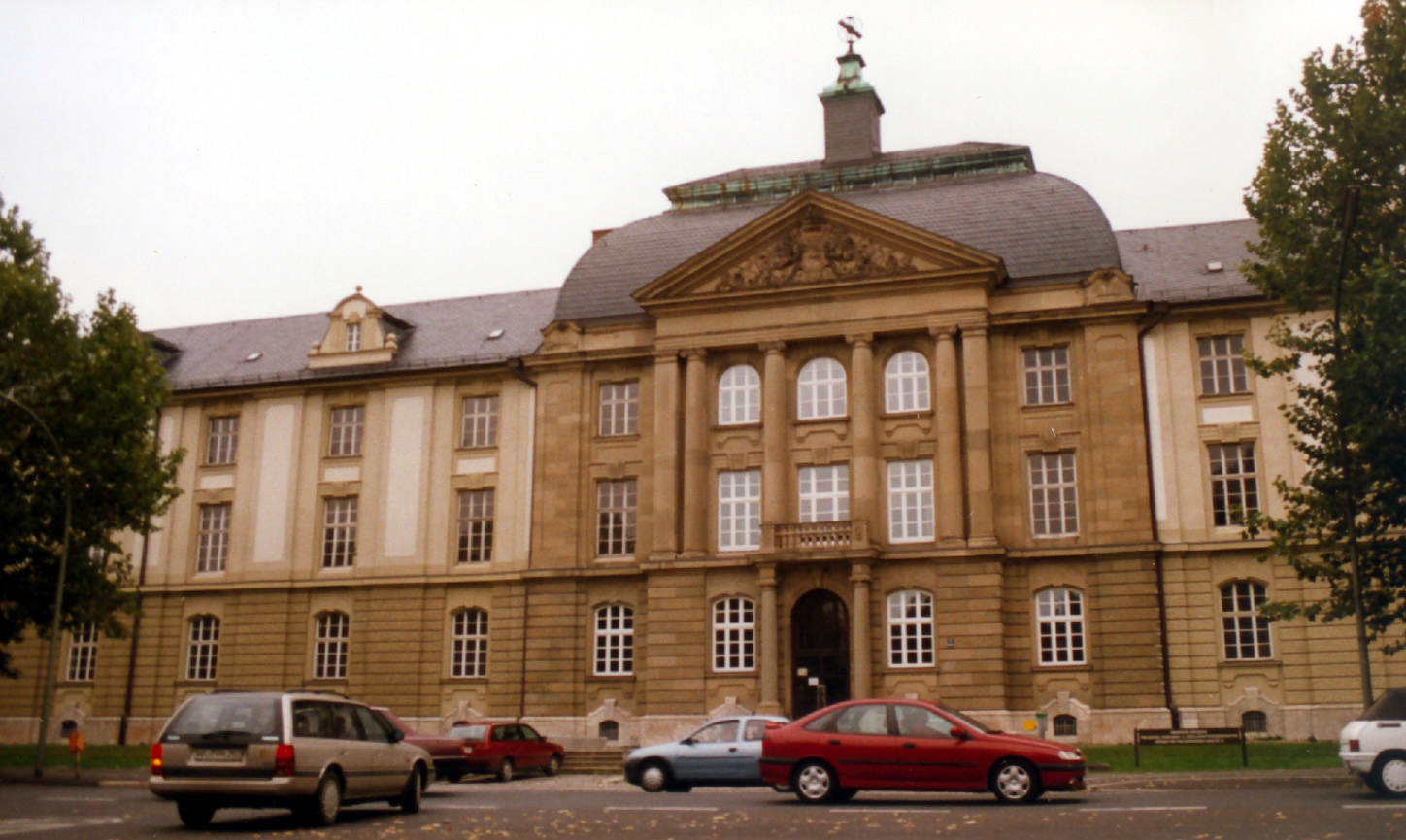
Building Wittelsbacherplatz

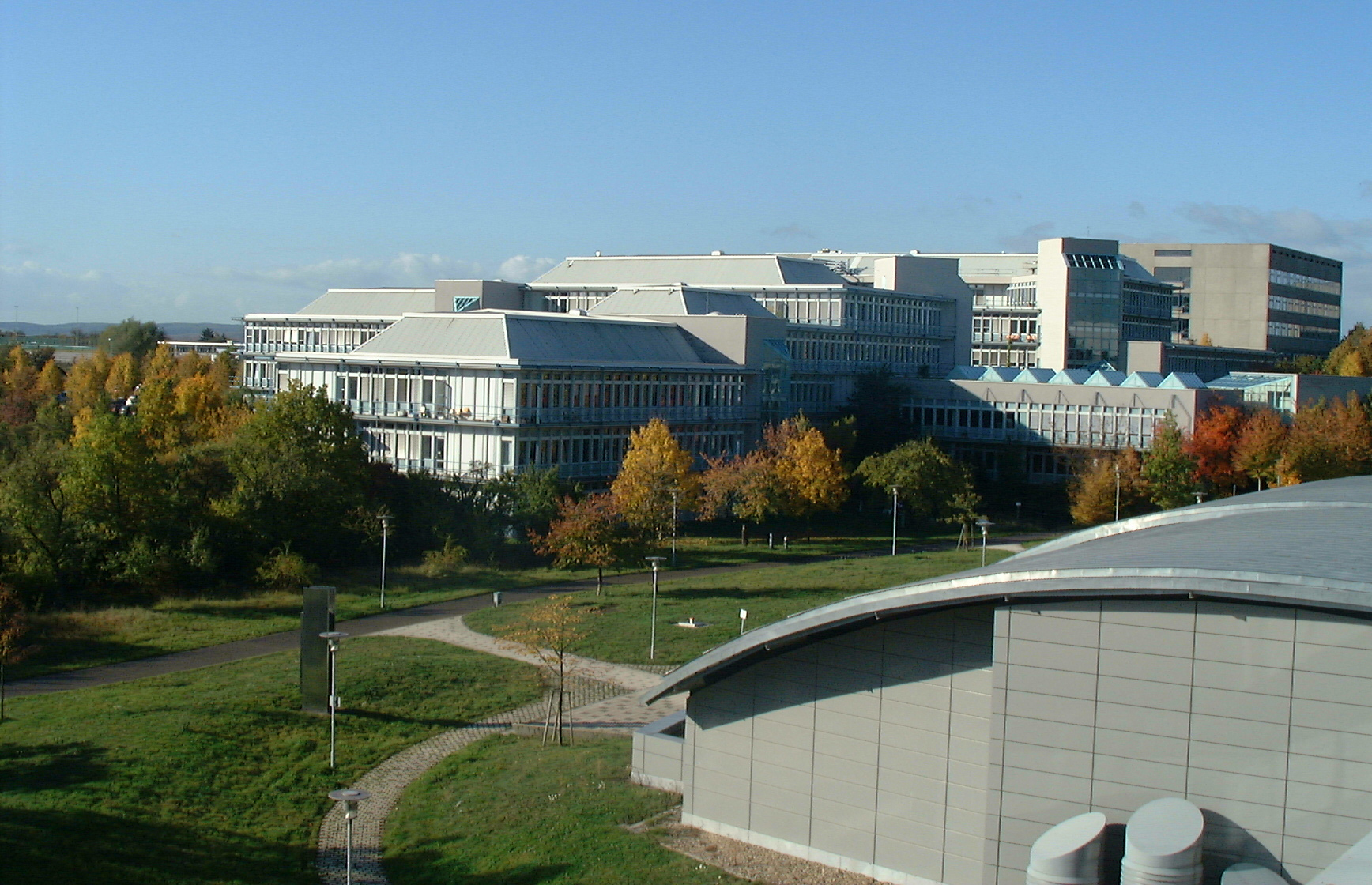
Biocenter
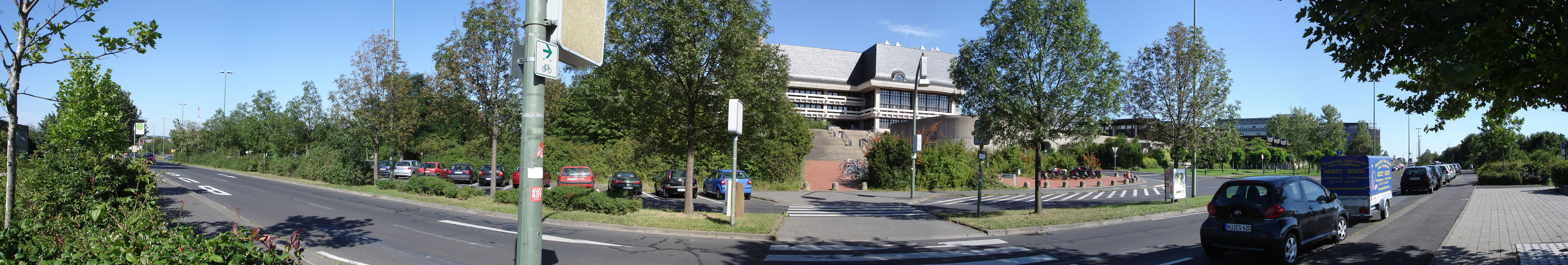
Central Library Building, Am Hubland

== Faculties ==
- Faculty of Catholic Theology
- Faculty of Law
- Faculty of Medicine (Human Medicine, Dentistry, and Biomedicine)
- Faculty of Arts: Historical, Philological, Cultural and Geographical Studies
- Faculty of Human Sciences
- Faculty of Biology
- Faculty of Chemistry and Pharmacy
- Faculty of Mathematics and Computer Science
- Faculty of Physics and Astronomy
- Faculty of Business Management and Economics

== Rankings ==
University rankings

Overall – Global & National
QS World 2024	440	23
THE World 2024	=175	17
ARWU World 2023	201–300	10–19

The University of Würzburg has been ranked globally and nationally in several university rankings. As of 2024, the QS World University Rankings places the university at 440 globally and 23rd in Germany. According to the Times Higher Education World University Rankings for 2024, it is positioned at 175th globally and 17th nationally. In the 2023 ARWU World Rankings, the University of Würzburg is within the 201–300 range globally and within the 10–19 range nationally.

== Nobel laureates ==
=== Worked at the university ===
- 1901 Wilhelm Conrad Röntgen (Physics)
- 1902 Emil Fischer (Chemistry)
- 1907 Eduard Buchner (Chemistry)
- 1911 Wilhelm Wien (Physics)
- 1919 Johannes Stark (Physics)
- 1935 Hans Spemann (Medicine)
- 1985 Klaus von Klitzing (Physics)
- 1988 Hartmut Michel (Chemistry)
- 2008 Harald zur Hausen (Medicine)
- 2026 Georg Nagel (Medicine)

=== Temporarily worked at the university ===
- 1903 Svante Arrhenius (Chemistry)
- 1909 Ferdinand Braun (Physics)
- 1914 Max von Laue (Physics)
- 1920 Walther Hermann Nernst (Chemistry)
- 1930 Karl Landsteiner (Medicine)

== See also ==
- Alexander Graham Bell honors and tributes
- Botanischer Garten der Universität Würzburg, the university's botanical garden
- List of Jesuit sites
- List of medieval universities
- Würzburg Universitätsbibliothek Cod. M. p. th. f. 67
