= Hartmannmühle station =

Railway station in Germany

Hartmannmühle
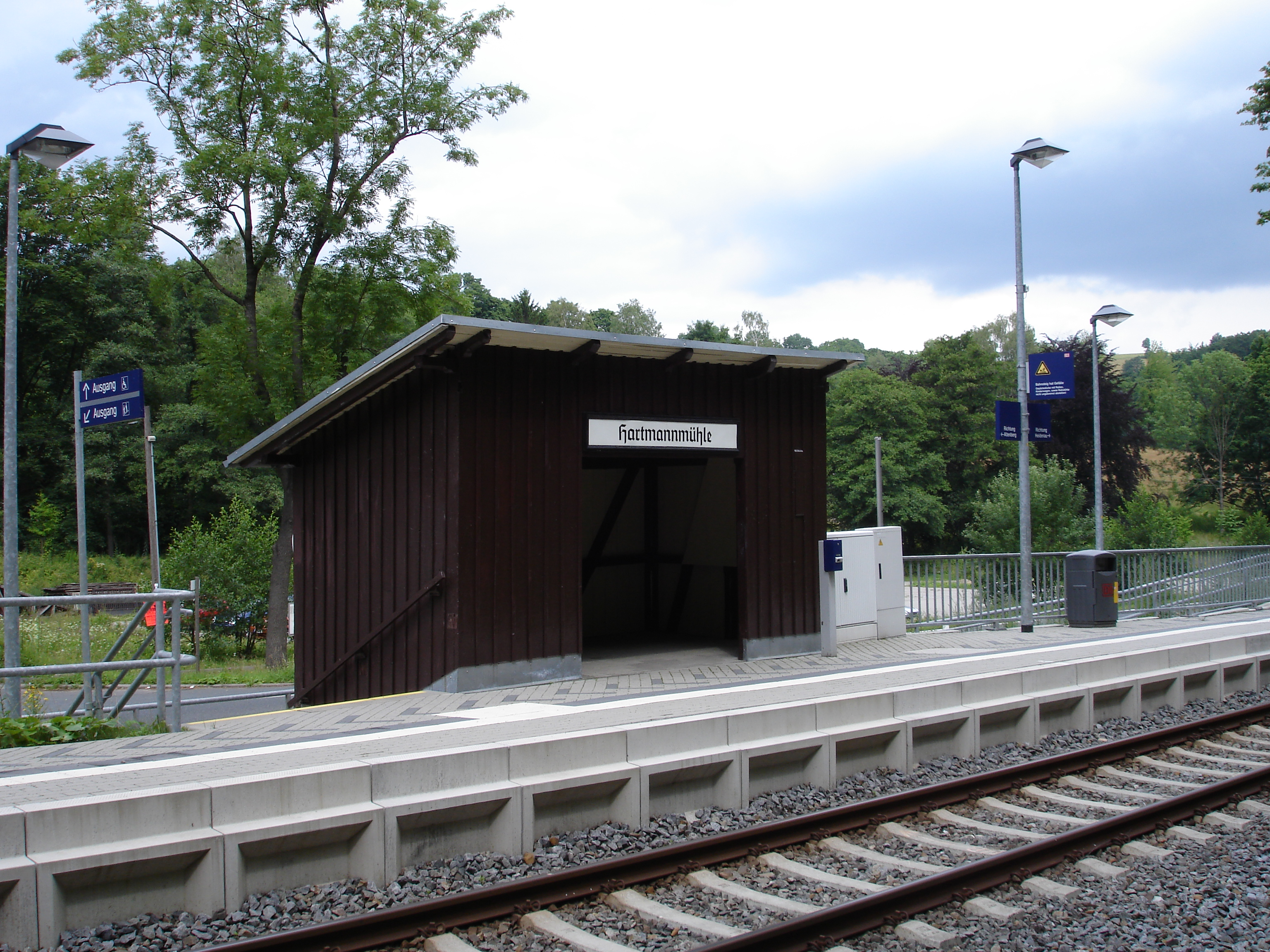
- 2008

General information
- Location: Müglitztalstraße; 01778 Geising; Saxony; Germany
- Coordinates: 50.7783°N 13.7923°E
- Elevation: 522 m (1,713 ft)
- Owner: DB Netz
- Operator: DB Station&Service
- Lines: Heidenau–Kurort Altenberg railway (KBS 246)
- Platforms: 1 side platform
- Tracks: 1
- Train operators: DB Regio Südost

Other information
- Station code: 2571
- DS100 code: DHMU
- IBNR: 8011825
- Category: 7
- Website: www.bahnhof.de

History
- Opened: 18 November 1890; 135 years ago

Services
Preceding station	DB Regio Südost	Following station
Lauenstein (Sachsen) towards Dresden Hbf	RE 19	Geising towards Kurort Altenberg (Erzgebirge)
Lauenstein (Sachsen) towards Heidenau	RB 72	Geising towards Kurort Altenberg (Erzgebirge)
Location
- Location within Saxony

Hartmannmühle station is a railway station in the Hartmannmühle district of the municipality of Geising, located in the Sächsische Schweiz-Osterzgebirge district in Saxony, Germany.
