= Heidenau–Kurort Altenberg railway =

Railway in Saxony, Germany

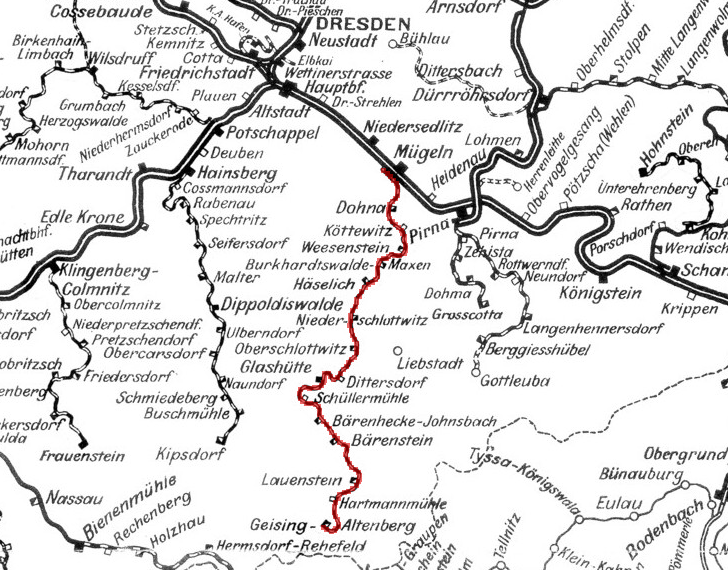

Overview
- Native name: Müglitztalbahn
- Line number: 6605
- Locale: Saxony, Germany
- Termini: Heidenau; Kurort Altenberg

Service
- Route number: 246, 246.1
- Operator(s): Deutsche Reichsbahn, DR, Deutsche Bahn

History
- Opened: 1938 (standard gauge)

Technical
- Line length: 38.00 km (23.61 mi)
- Track gauge: 1,435 mm (4 ft 8 1/2 in) standard gauge
- Old gauge: 750 mm (2 ft 5 1/2 in)
- Minimum radius: 139 m (456.0 ft)
- Operating speed: 70 km/h (43 mph)
- Maximum incline: 36 ‰

The Heidenau–Kurort Altenberg railway, also known in German as the Müglitztalbahn ("Müglitz Valley Railway") is a German railway in Saxony. Branching off the Elbe Valley Railway, it connects the town of Heidenau near Dresden with the towns of Glashütte and Altenberg in the Ore Mountains, where it terminates. The total length is 38 km, with a total incline of 634 meters. The scenic track follows primarily the Müglitz river, passing the towns of Dohna, Glashütte and Geising.

The railway was initially a narrow gauge railway, which was opened on 17 November 1890. Between 1935 and 1938, the tracks were graded and converted to standard gauge.

Passenger transport services are operated on behalf of Verkehrsverbund Oberelbe by Städtebahn Sachsen since 12 December 2010 following a retendering of the transport services. The rail infrastructure is operated by DB Netz, the stations are run by DB Station&Service.

== History ==
In the middle of the 19th century, an industrial boom, supported by small and medium-sized enterprises, began in the Müglitz valley, which coincided with the beginning of the manufacture of watches in Glashütte (1845). In addition, a number of smaller production facilities in the wood and paper industry were built after Friedrich Gottlob Keller invented a method for making paper from wood pulp in 1843. Along the Müglitz numerous small paper and paper industries were established, including large paper factories such as the Peschelmühle near Burkhardswalde and the Pappenfabrik Glashütte (1886). Also metalworking plants such as the Schlottwitz machine factory and iron foundry in Glashütte (1874). The upturn in the industrial economy was closely linked to the growing industries in the Dresden Basin, which depended on supplies from the surrounding area. The transport systems were not able to cope with the increased requirements (access to raw materials, transport of finished products), so that between 1846 and 1864, the Müglitz valley road was extended and rebuilt.

In the medium term, however, the valley road was hardly able to cope with ever-increasing quantities of goods, especially as the demand for cheap lignite rose for the operation of steam boilers. Since horse-drawn carts were unable to match the capacity, speed and costs of the railway, manufacturers, merchants, trade associations and representatives of the cities demanded the construction of a railway line from 1865. It would connect the municipalities in the Müglitz valley to the Dresden–Bodenbach line and the lignite deposits of the North Bohemian Basin via the Ore Mountains. In December 1887, the Saxon Landtag (parliament) agreed to the construction of the railway, as the competitiveness of the companies in the valley diminished markedly in the 1880s due to poor accessibility. Plans, which provided, among other things, for lines via Lockwitz–Kreischa–Schlottwitz or Pirna–Zehista–Liebstadt–Schlottwitz could not be realised and the factories in the lower Müitz valley were not connected. The permit was therefore given for the construction of a complete valley railway from Mügeln bei Pirna (now a district of Heidenau) to Geising. It was designed as a 750 mm gauge railway to make it easier to follow the curves of the valley and to provide numerous connections. A continuation to Bohemia did not occur because the transit traffic was considered to be insufficient and would have been difficult to finance the technically complex route through Bohemia that would have been required by the steep descent following the crossing of the Ore Mountains.

=== The narrow-gauge railway from 1890 to 1939 ===
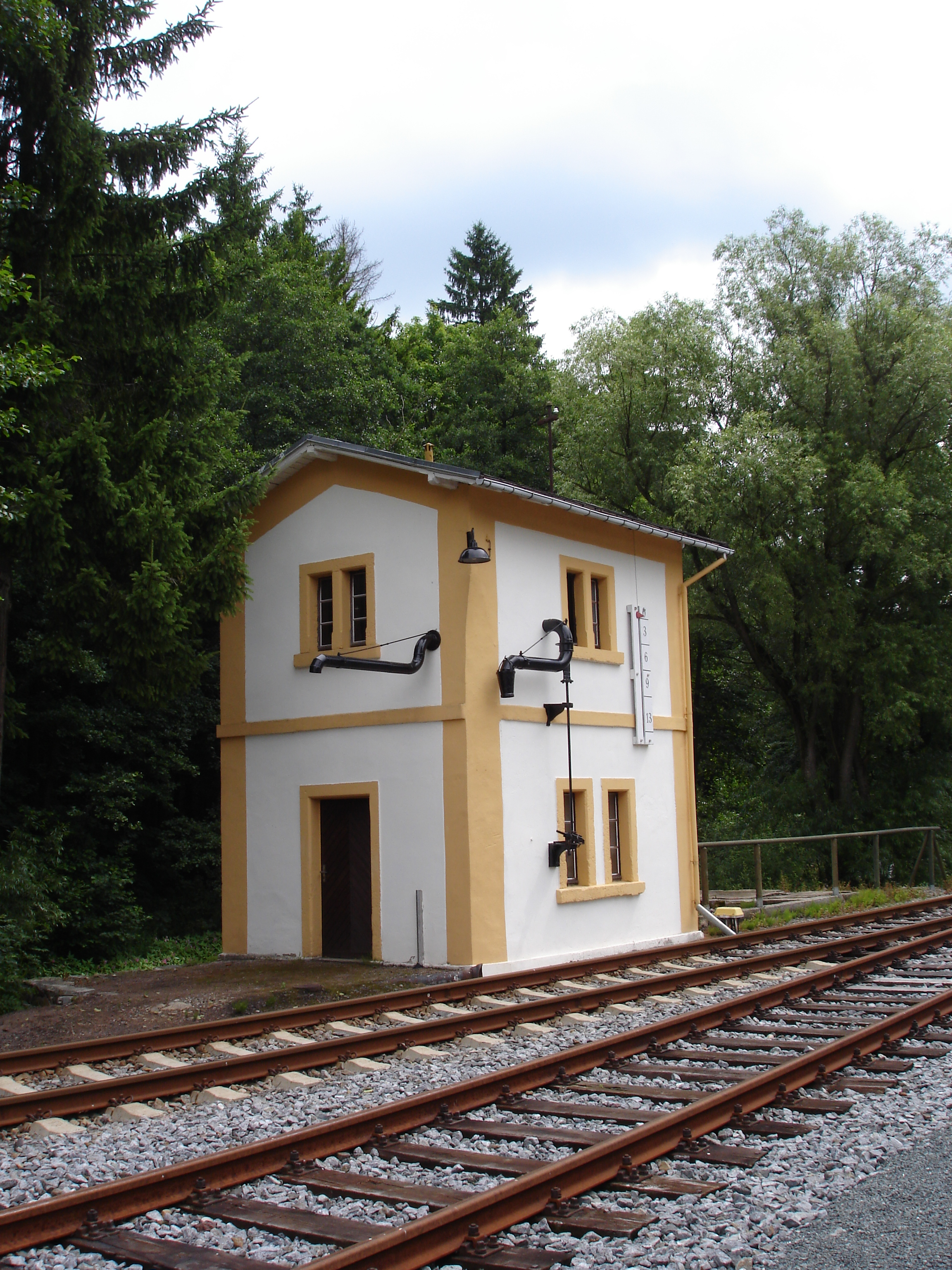
Water house in Bärenstein from 1890

After two years of construction, with up to 1100 workers per month, the line was put into operation on 17 November 1890. It was 36.1 km long and overcame a difference in height of 470 m. The narrow and winding valley made considerable demands on the route selection. Of the total length, 86% was uphill (31 km) and 40% was in curvy sections (14.5 km). The Geising Viaduct was at 65 m long, the longest of the 57 bridges built. For the time being, Altenberg did not have a connection to the railway, as there was insufficient finance and no suitable locomotives available for the steep Geising–Altenberg section. Geising station was officially given the double name of "Geising-Altenberg", although the hill town hardly gained any benefit, since it was about 3 km away from and 160 metres in altitude above Geising. Despite this small "flaw", the railway was greeted by the valley inhabitants with festivals, fireworks and gun salutes. The first timetable provided for four daily train pairs; the travel time for the entire route was 150 minutes, a one-way trip in second class cost 2.30 Marks.

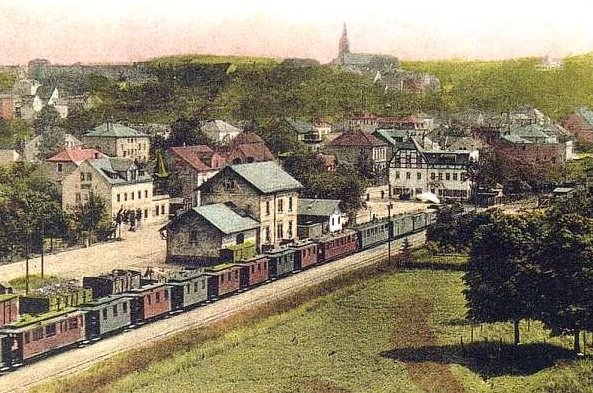
Dohna: station with train on the narrow gauge line in May 1912

The total of 3.6 million Marks spent on the railway contributed significantly to the economic boom of the neighbouring communities. As early as 1895, 14 industrial plants were connected by branches. In addition to the finished products, lignite, wood pulp, straw, paper, wood and bricks have been transported. From the 1920s, ice blocks were carried in winter from the Große Galgenteich lake near Altenberg to the Dresden cold stores. Passenger traffic was also significant. Numerous hikers took advantage of the railway to travel from Dresden and the Dresden Basin into the Ore Mountain area, which developed into a summer resort. The snow safety of the upper levels has also given the railway significant winter sport traffic since the turn of the century. As a result, it developed into one of the most economic routes in the Saxonian narrow-gauge railway network. Because of the heavy freight traffic, there were even proposals in 1914 for the operational separation of goods and passenger traffic on the Mügeln–Weesenstein section by the construction of a second railway. However, these plans were not implemented due to the post-war economic crisis. Instead, the extension of the line to Altenberg became the focus of interest. The town repeatedly proposed an extension of the railway. Various plans would have seen a continuation from Geising via Altenberg to Moldava, Hermsdorf, Kipsdorf or Frauenstein.

Heidenau–Altenberg (Narrow gauge)

Overview
- Native name: Müglitztalbahn
- Termini: Heidenau; Altenberg

Service
- Type: Narrow gauge railway
- Operator(s): Royal Saxon State Railways and Deutsche Reichsbahn

History
- Opened: 17 November 1890

Technical
- Track gauge: 750 mm (2 ft 5 1/2 in)

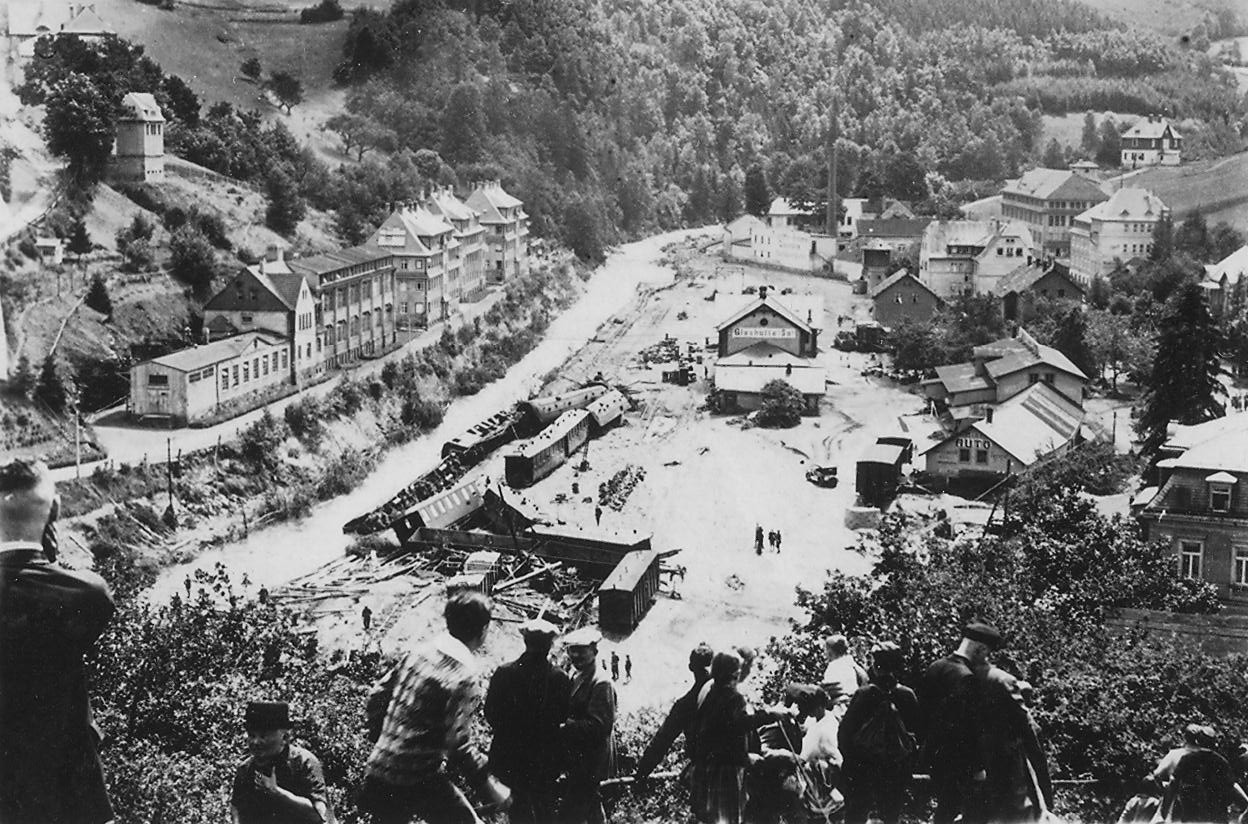
Glashütte: Devastation after the 1927 flood

The government did not support these projects because of high construction costs and the low revenues expected. The 1914 proposal for an extension to Altenberg failed at the beginning of the First World War, but was then started as an emergency project in 1919. Within four years the 5.5 km-long roundabout line from Geising via the Geisingberg to Altenberg was opened on 10 November 1923. Large sections of the railway line were destroyed during a devastating flood on 8 July 1927.

=== Conversion to standard gauge ===
Because of the steadily increasing transport demand after the Great Depression, Deutsche Reichsbahn decided to rebuild the line as standard gauge in 1934. This project was implemented between 1935 and December 1938. The Heidenau-Lauenstein section was completely redesigned; on the rest of the section to Altenberg, only the radius of the curve was enlarged. As a result, the line was approximately 3 km shorter.

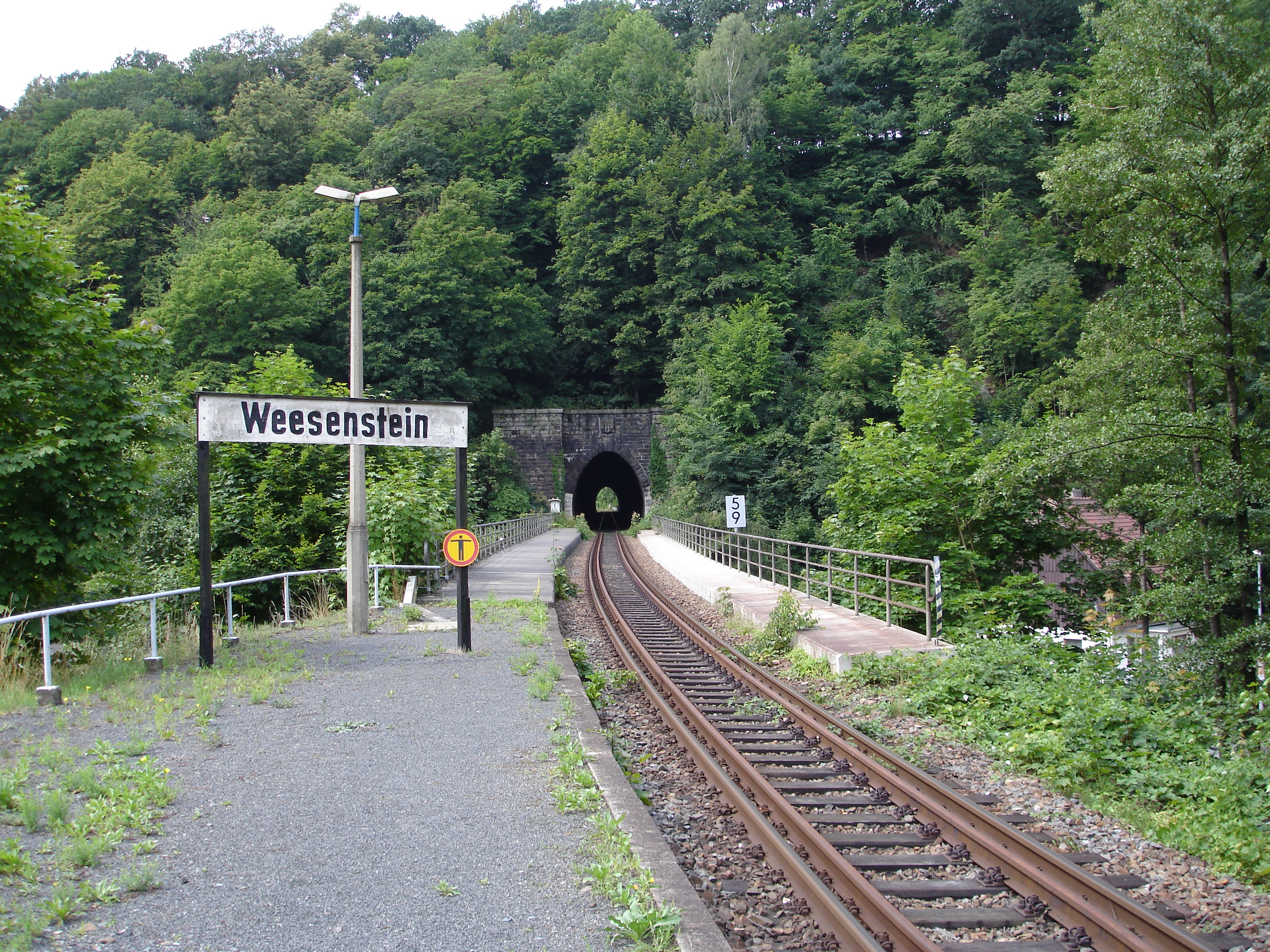
North portal of the Weesenstein Tunnel

With the commencement of services on the standard gauge track in 1938, the number of road and track crossings and thus the danger of accidents were markedly reduced despite the increasing road traffic, but the Niederschlottwitz–Glashütte section was not accessible until April 1939. The flood risk also declined due to the raising of the line, although not on all sections of the line. However, the creation of a profitable basis for freight transport and improvements in passenger services were more important. For Deutsche Reichsbahn, the railway was the "new gateway to the eastern Ore Mountains", which made the Altenberg winter sport region "a sports ground at the gates of the national capital". The travel time for passenger services was shortened significantly, Altenberg was approximately 70 minutes from Dresden, about 160 minutes from Leipzig and about 180 minutes from Berlin.

=== During the Second World War ===
The outbreak of the Second World War strongly restricted tourism. Because of the lack of coal, only three to five pairs of passenger trains operated every day, but the number of railcars from regions affected by air warfare was increasing. At the end of the Second World War there were fighting in the Müglitz Valley between Soviet and German troops. In April 1945, the railway installations in Glashütte, Bärenhecke-Johnsbach and Altenberg were damaged by strafing. In the last days of the war in May 1945 further damage occurred during air raids on Altenberg and Glashütte. Parts of the 10th SS Panzer Division Frundsberg used the Müglitz Valley as a retreat to northern Bohemia and planned the demolition of the Weesenstein tunnel. The derailment of a military train at Bärenstein on 7 May, as well as the rapid Soviet advance, prevented the planned destruction of the operationally important railway.

=== After the Second World War ===
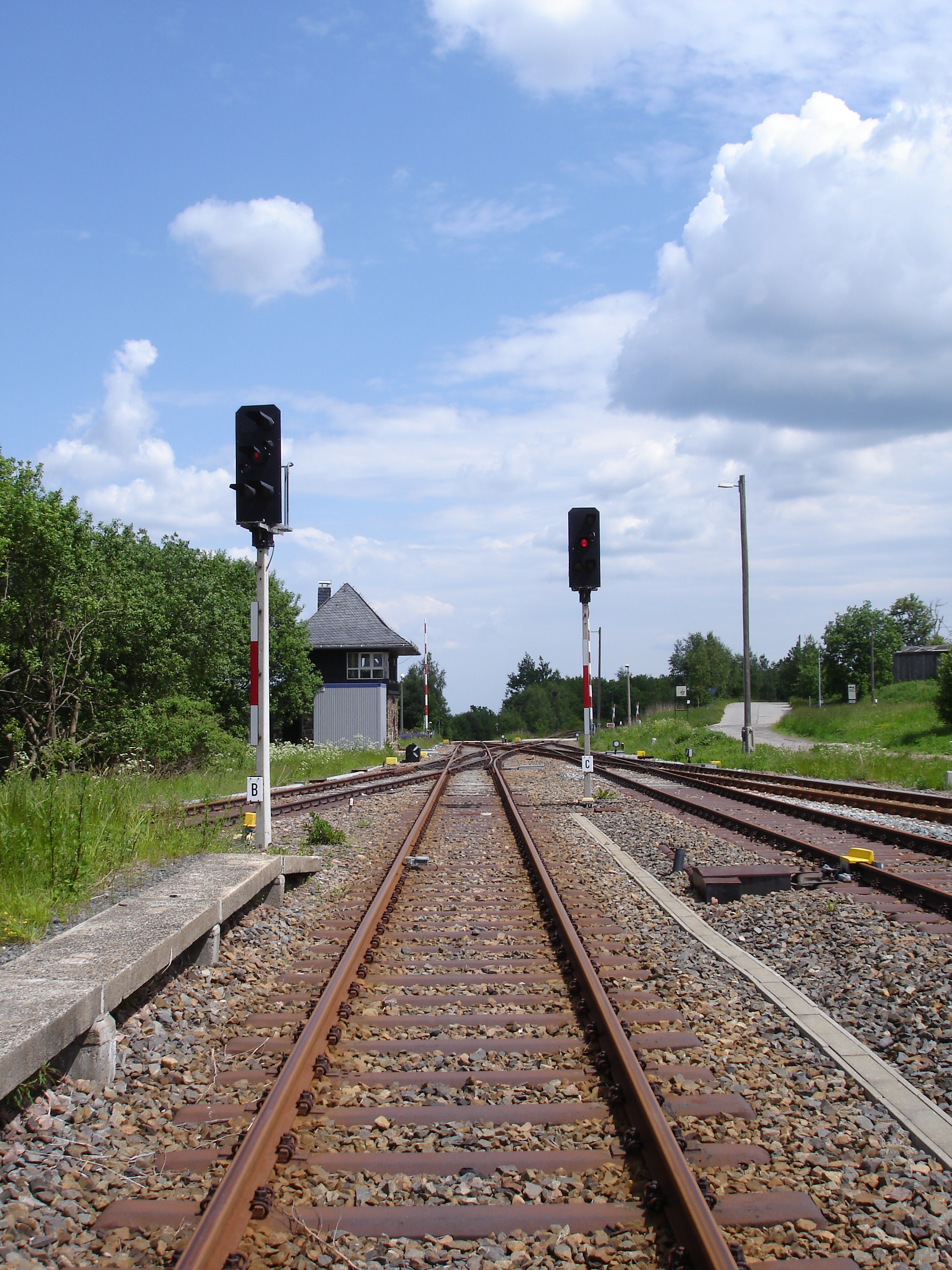
Entrance to Kurort Altenberg station

Although the Müglitz Valley Railway survived the Second World War largely intact apart from isolated damage in some railway stations, the enterprise was difficult in the early post-war years. On the other hand, there was an acute shortage of rollingstock as on all other lines. Class 84 locomotives were used for the transport of uranium in the Western Ore Mountains and passenger cars of the "Altenberg" class were used for express services. On the other hand, the track of the line had been built between 1935 and 1938 out of reused materials due to the scarcity of raw materials, and the material shortage of the immediate post-war years made the urgently necessary renewal difficult. From 1949/50, it was possible to speak of an initial normalisation of traffic, which included, among other things, the reinstatement of the first winter sports traffic. In the passenger and freight transport sector of the early 1950s, the operations of the uranium ore mining operation of the SDAG Wismut company near Bärenhecke played an important role between 1948 and 1954. All in all, rail traffic reached considerable proportions again. In the mid-1960s, at least 14 plants were connected to nine freight lines, including metal, chemical and paper processing companies in Dohna (VEB Druckguss Heidenau and VEB Chemiewerke Dohna). In passenger transport, it was used by hikers as well as increasingly by commuters to the Dresden Basin.

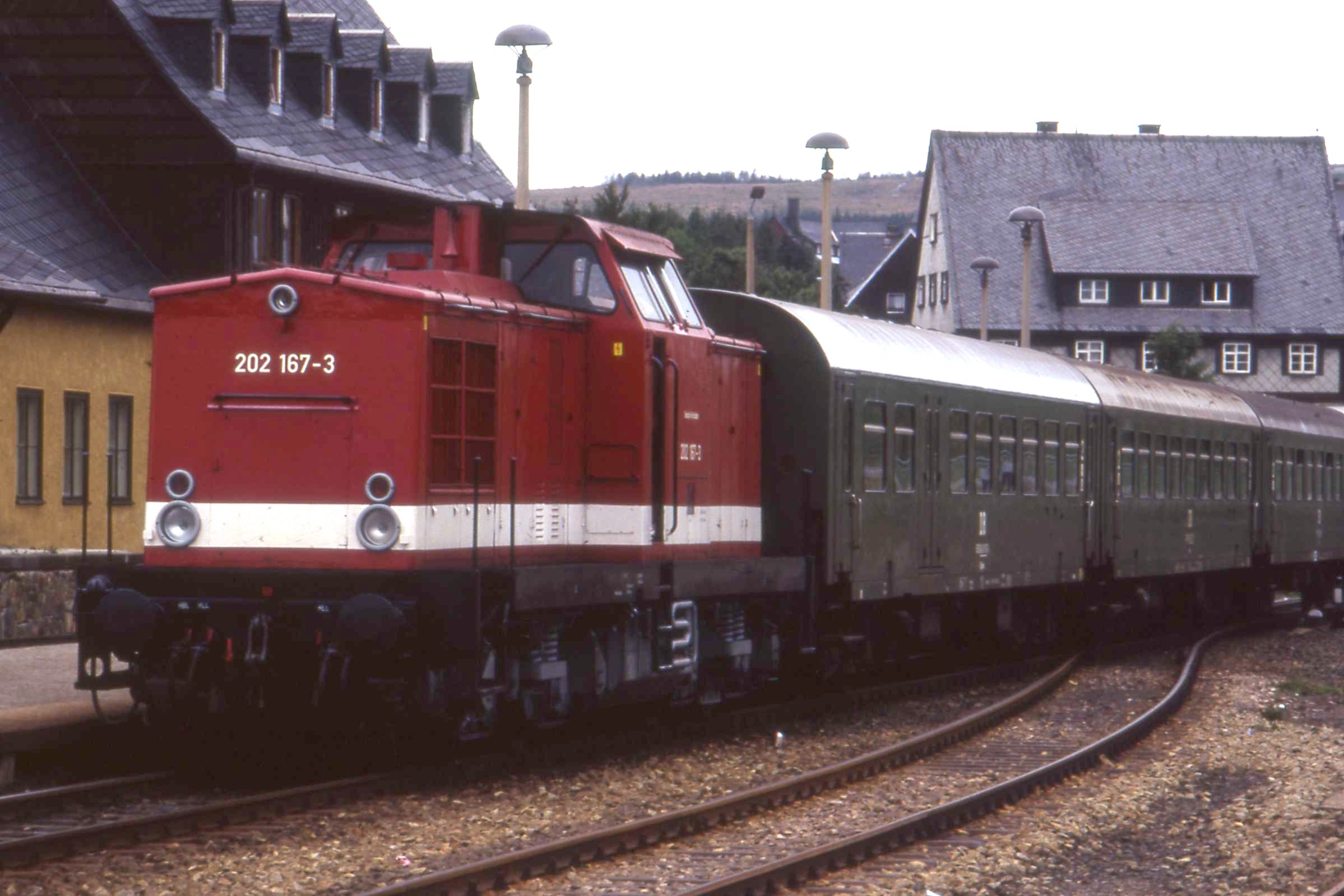
Passenger train in Altenberg station (1992)

Since the beginning of the 1960s, Deutsche Reichsbahn has been trying to increase the transport performance and profitability of the railways by the use of railcars, double-deck wagons and diesel locomotives. While the operation of the former succeeded only to a limited extent, the diesel traction increasingly took over operations from the mid-1960s onwards with the class 110. This locomotive class took over operations on the Müglitz Valley Railway from 1967. At the same time, there were considerations of abandoning operations, in particular freight, on part or even all of the line. This was an issue particularly after the flooding in October 1966 of Geising station with a wave carrying sludge and gravel, which had escaped after the failure of the drainage system of VEB Zinnerz Altenberg. In addition, the railway was affected by increased the competition from private cars. This, however, was probably the reason for a shift in transport services to the already heavily used streets, especially in the winter months on the Dresden–Altenberg and Heidenau–Altenberg routes. Nevertheless, freight traffic declined in the following decades and focused on the section between Heidenau and Köttewitz. The route was maintained as a route for excursion traffic. In the winter months numerous special trains were used, connecting Altenberg directly with Dresden, Cottbus, Halle (Saale), Leipzig, Riesa and Hoyerswerda.

In the mid-1970s there were serious plans to electrify the line. The electrification was to be carried out by Czechoslovak State Railways (ČSD) in May 1976 after completion of work on the Elbe Valley Railway between Dresden and Schöna. Technically, it would have been easy to carry out, since all the tunnels have the rail profile necessary for the catenary installation. The project was not implemented for unknown reasons.

=== Decline and refurbishment to 1990 ===
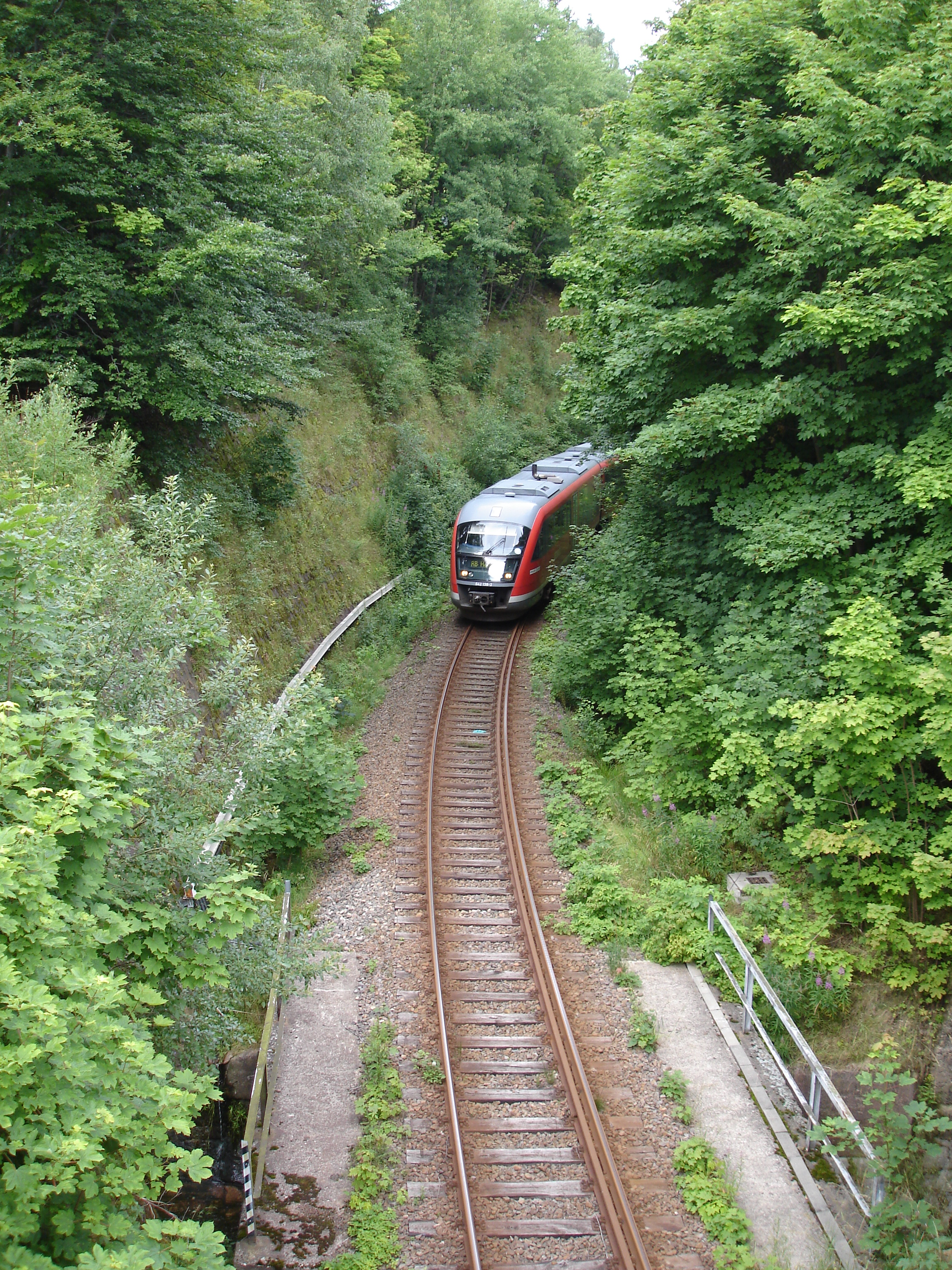
Train moving down the incline at Geising (2008)

In July 1990, the Müglitz Valley Railway celebrated the 100th anniversary of the opening of its route. The economic upheaval that began as a result of German reunification put the continuation of operations on the line into question again. A number of industrial enterprises were closed between Heidenau and Altenberg at the beginning of the 1990s. In 1991 the VEB Zinnerz Altenberg factory was closed. Other companies were able to continue their production only to a much lesser extent. As a result, the railways lost a large part of the freight volume within a few years. The decline in traffic volume was exacerbated by the sudden increase in competition between road and rail fieight transport as well as rail passenger transport. This negative development led to the closure of the freight operations south of Köttewitz (where there is a siding to the Fluorchemie factory) in 1995. Due to the uncertain future of the route, Deutsche Bahn failed to carry out necessary investments and only remediated wear and tear. As a result of this and the further decline in passenger numbers, the decommissioning of the entire line for safety reasons was considered in 1997. Also, the timetable introduced in that year was operationally unstable during the peak hours and its regular-interval timetable of services every two hours was unattractive.

It was only when the Verkehrsverbund Oberelbe, the local public transport utility, took over the line and awarded a contract to DB for the operation of train services for 15 years that a general restoration took place in 1998/99. The expenditure of €15 to 20 million enabled a thorough renewal of the railways and thus the elimination of numerous speed restrictions. In addition, DB used modern Siemens Desiro sets. With a reduction of travel times of60 minutes, services running every to 60 or 90 minutes and the use of new technology, there was a considerable increase in passenger numbers. The rehabilitated railway achieved patronage of about 1,200 to 2,000 passengers a day and thus proved its profitability. It was not only important for tourists, but also for student and commuter traffic.

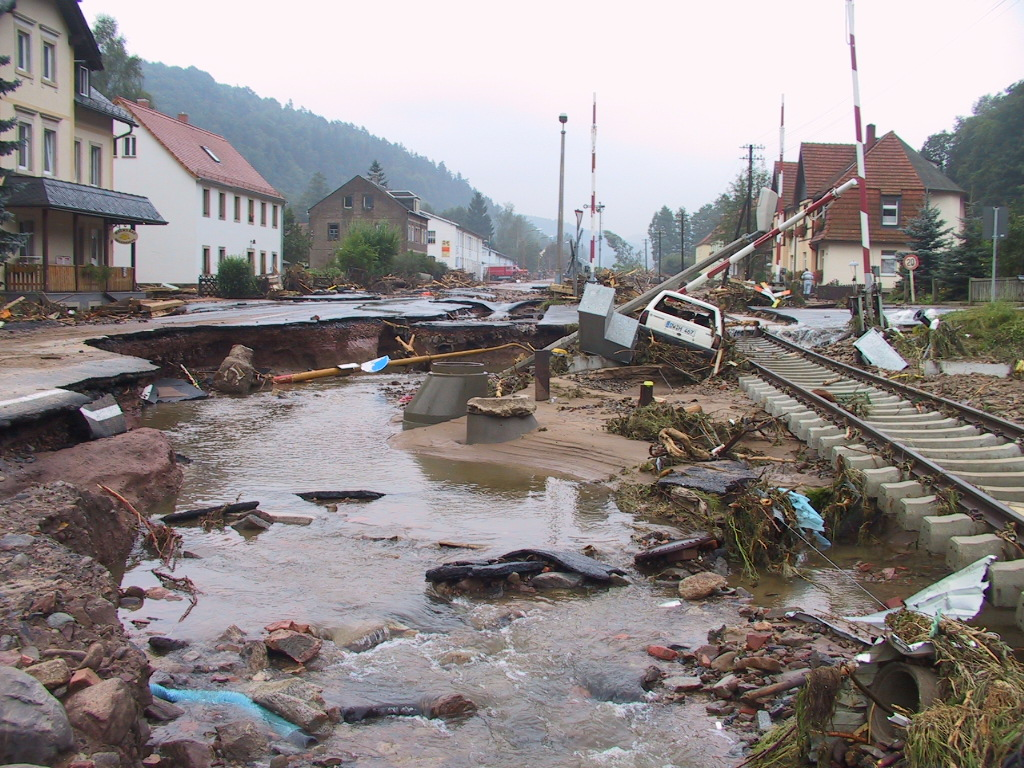
The ruined track in Schlottwitz after the 2002 flood

As early as 1897, during the floods in the Eastern Ore Mountains of 1927 as well as in 1954, 1957, 1958 and 1966, serious flood damage occurred along the line, but this was by no means as great as the 2002 floods. Between 12 and 14 August 2002 enormous masses of water were discharged above the crest of the Eastern Ore Mountains. In Zinnwald-Georgenfeld, 406 mm of rain fell in this time, almost half of the annual average precipitation. The torrential rain turned the Müglitz into a torrential stream, devastating almost the entire valley. The situation was exacerbated by the break-up of the only flood retention basin in the Brießnitz valley, which is located above Glashütte. For the third time after 1897 and 1927, the line was largely destroyed. The dams and bridges were submerged and heavily devastated by parts of structures that had broken away. The resulting total loss amounted to approximately €50 million.

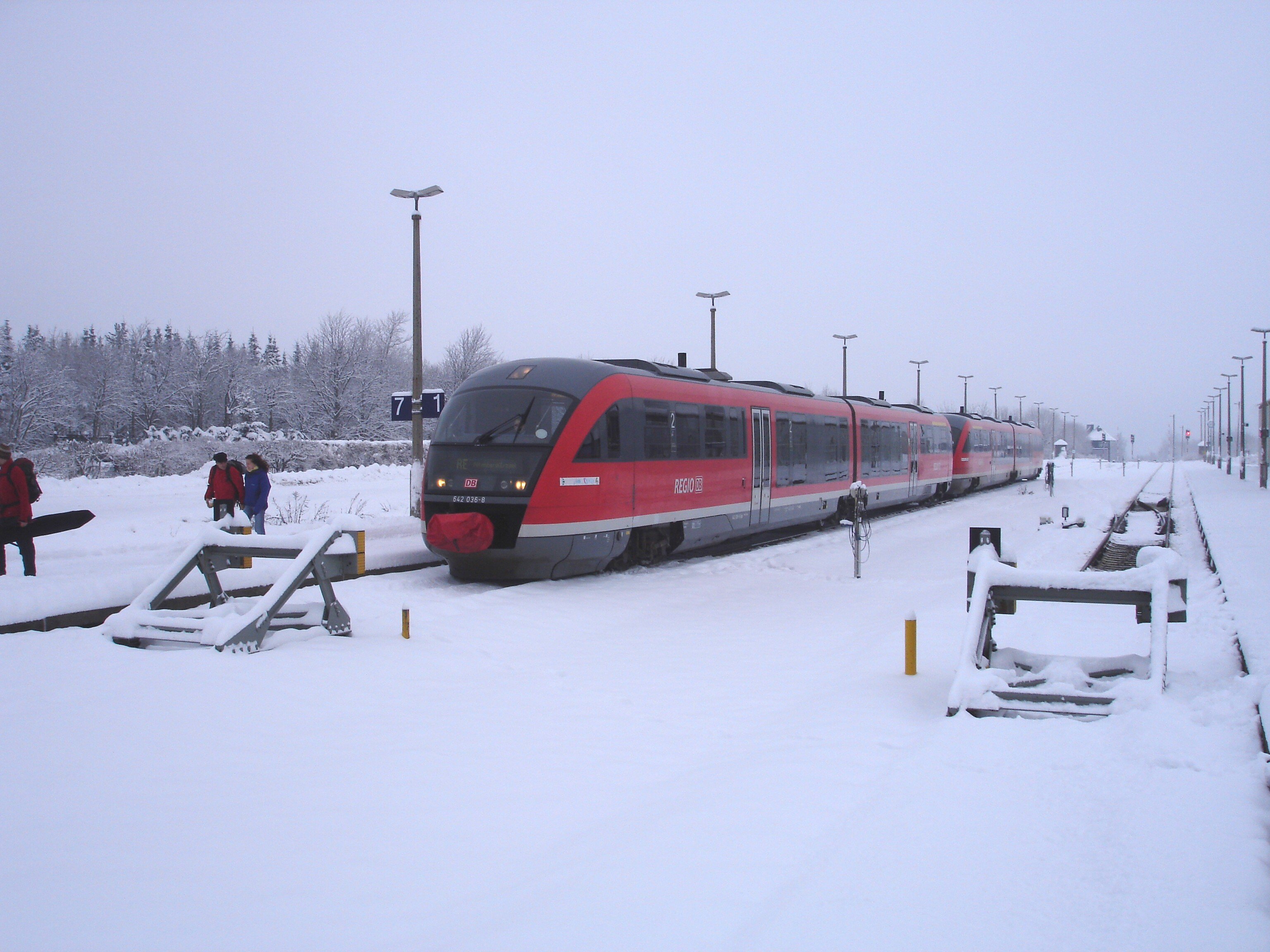
Winter sports train in Kurort Altenberg station (2008)

On 11 December 2002, after the construction of 1888/90, the flood of 1927, the standardisation in 1934/39 and the rehabilitation in 1998/99, the fifth period of major works on the railway began, which was finished by 20 December 2003. The resumption of operations was celebrated with popular festivals; Altenberg alone welcomed around 2,000 people on the first train. Its journey was preceded by the construction of two bridges and the repair of a further 13 bridges and five railway stations. Within a very short time, the railway reached patronage levels similar than before the flood with about 1,000 passengers each day and thus proved its importance as a transport route through the Eastern Ore Mountains.

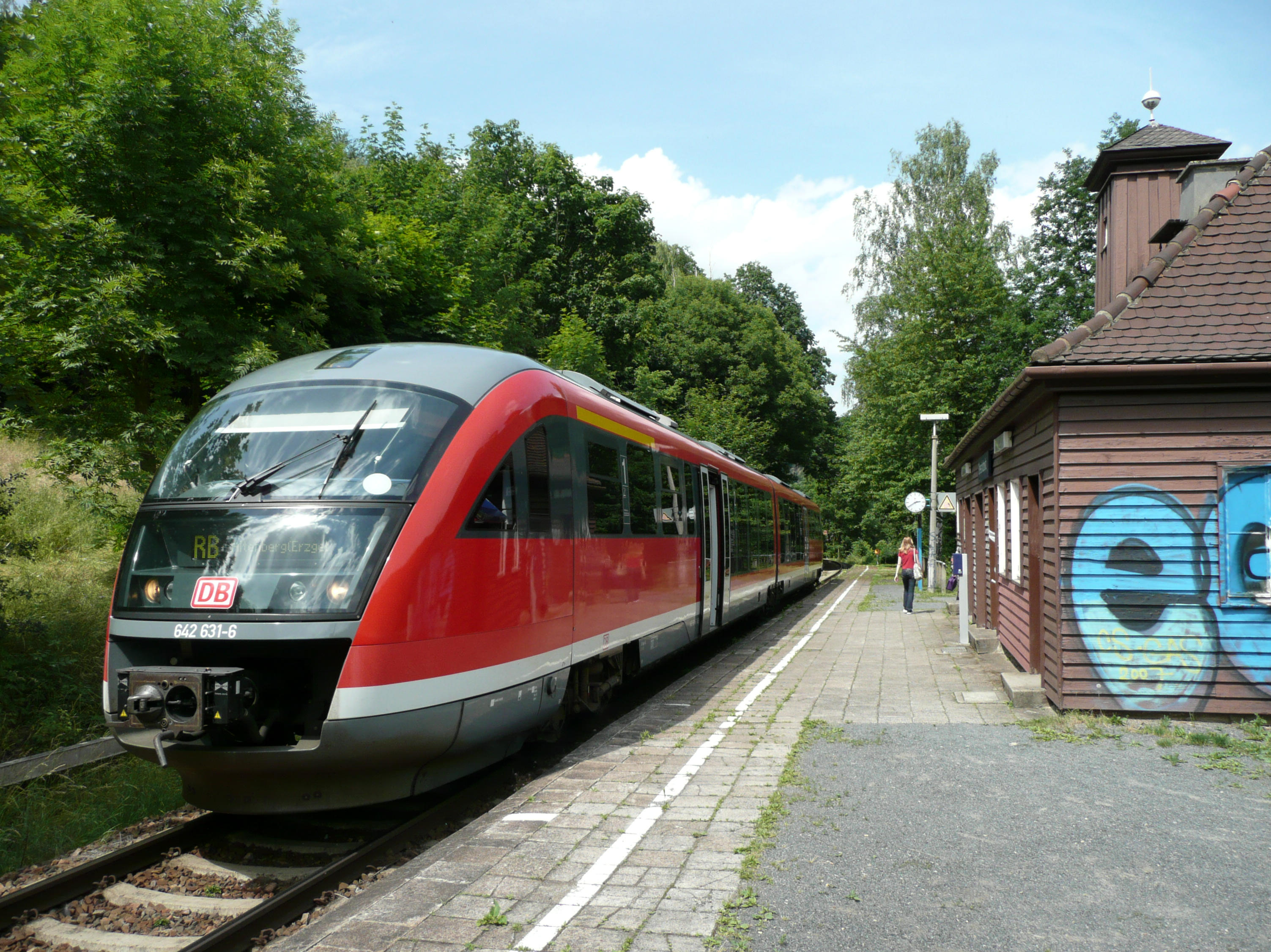
Regionalbahn service in Oberschlottwitz

At the end of December 2010, Regionalbahn RB72 (Heidenau–Kurort Altenberg) services were running on the line; there were additional Regional-Express RE19 (Dresden Hbf–Kurort Altenberg) services run on the weekends of the winter half year. A special feature of the route is that these additional trains are only run if the conditions are appropriate for winter sports. It is announced in the traditional media on Thursdays whether they are running. The 2008 timetable included a total of 14 pairs of regional railway train running between Heidenau and Altenberg. Apart from a few gaps in the morning, a regular-interval hourly service was offered on working days. On the weekends, services ran every two hours.

=== Current operation ===
The responsible authority for the provision of transport services in regional traffic is the Verkehrsverbund Oberelbe (VVO). After all transport services were retendered, they have been provided by the Städtebahn Sachsen since 12 December 2010. The services have been operated as SB72 and SE19 since then. It has a full-day regular-interval hourly service with trains crossing in Glashütte. On the weekends, the timetable remains unchanged with a two-hour cycle. In order to connect with the S-Bahn in Heidenau, the timetable has an unusual symmetry minute, which is approximately at 14 minute past the hour. Köttewitz, Weesenstein, Burkhardswalde-Maxen, Mühlbach (b Pirna), Oberschlottwitz, Bärenhecke-Johnsbach, Bärenstein (b Glashütte/Sachs) and Hartmannmühle stations are request stops. As in the past, additional direct trains are still operated between Dresden Hbf and Kurort Altenberg, only stopping at selected stations.

From 10 December 2011 to 14 December 2014, the little used request stops of Köttewitz and Burkhardswalde-Maxen were not served. The reason for this was the construction of the S-Bahn tracks between Dresden-Neustadt and Coswig, which led to timetable changes. In order to speed up the trains and ensure connections in Heidenau, the VVO decided to drop the stops temporarily.

On 2 June 2013, train operations had to be stopped again due to floods. In contrast to the flood in 2002, however, there was only minor damage, and the trains were able to return to schedule as of noon on 4 June.

== Buildings ==
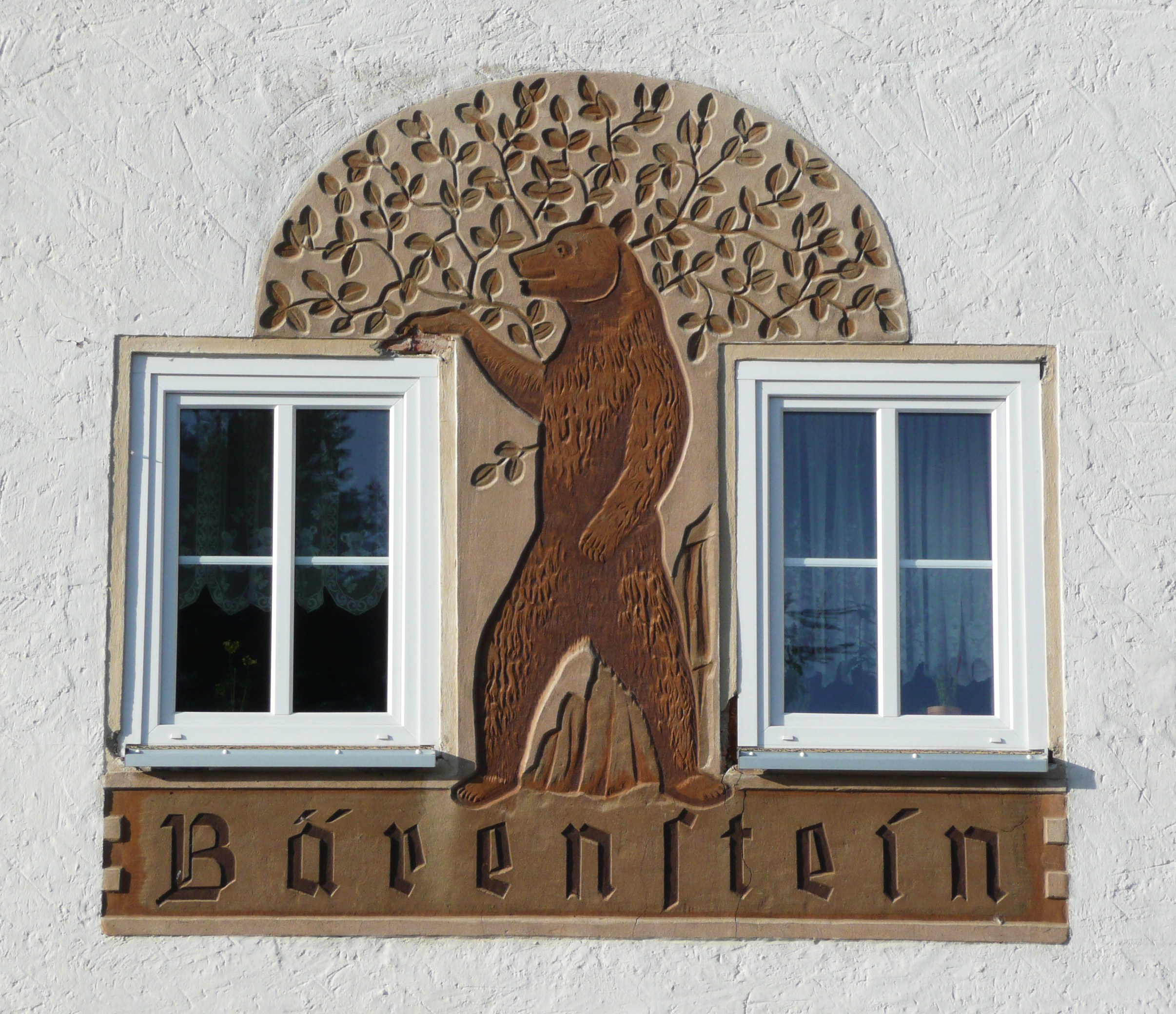
Sgraffito at Bärenstein station

During the reconstruction of the line in the 1930s, a great deal of importance was attached to the connection of the station buildings to the landscape. The goal was to create a smooth transition between the rural structures of the Dresden Basin and those of the eastern Ore Mountains. Even smaller halts were given individually designed wooden service buildings.

At the same time, a new slate-covered steep roof and the use of wood as a building material for all attachments, such as freight sheds and waiting rooms, are common to all the newly built station buildings. The red-painted window frames are also typical of the landscape. Some of the buildings–as in Burkhardswalde-Maxen and Lauenstein–are decorated with Sgraffito elements on the facades.

During the floods of August 2002, some of the station buildings of the line were badly affected.

== Route description ==
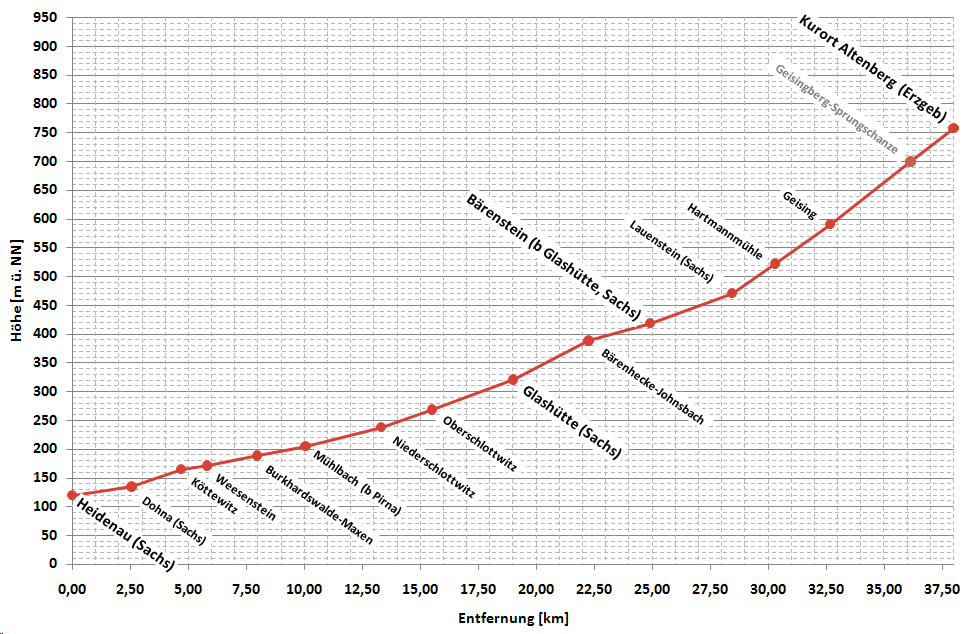
Simplified height profile of the route

The route turns from Heidenau station southwards into the Müglitz valley and crosses the four-lane state road 172. Just before Dohna, it crosses Autobahn 17 and climbs the first significant slope before Köttewitz station. After the station, the Müglitz is crossed for the first time, followed immediately by the first and, at 198 metres, the longest of a total of four tunnels through spurs. Just after Weesenstein station, the route is shortened again by a second tunnel, 240 metres long. After Burkhardswalde-Maxen, the valley narrows for a short time and at 15.0 km between Niederschwottwitz and Oberschwottwitz, the line runs past the rock of the Schlottwitz agate lode. Again, the valley is shortened before Glashütte with the 292 metre-long Brückenmühle tunnel. After the station is the longest tunnel of the line, 539 metres long, and a two-lane concrete bridge, which is untypical of the Müglitz Valley Railway, is traversed at Bärenhecke-Johnsbach. From Lauenstein, the line leaves the Müglitz valley and follows the Roten Wasser (part of the Greifenbach) valley to the southwest towards Geising. The town itself is reached to the north through a 235-metre-long curving tunnel and a 76-metre-long bridge so that the line changes direction completely from running south to running north. The last section leaves the valley on the western slope and rounds the Geisingberg. Starting from kilometre 36.6, the steepest section begins with a gradient of 1:37.6.

=== Stations ===
Heidenau (50°58′52″N 13°51′29″E)

The Müglitz Valley Railway begins in Heidenau station on the Děčín–Dresden-Neustadt railway. There is a connection to the Dresden S-Bahn line S1 (Meissen-Triebischtal – Schöna) and S2 (Dresden Flughafen – Pirna).

Dohna (Sachs) (50°57′40″N 13°51′20″E)

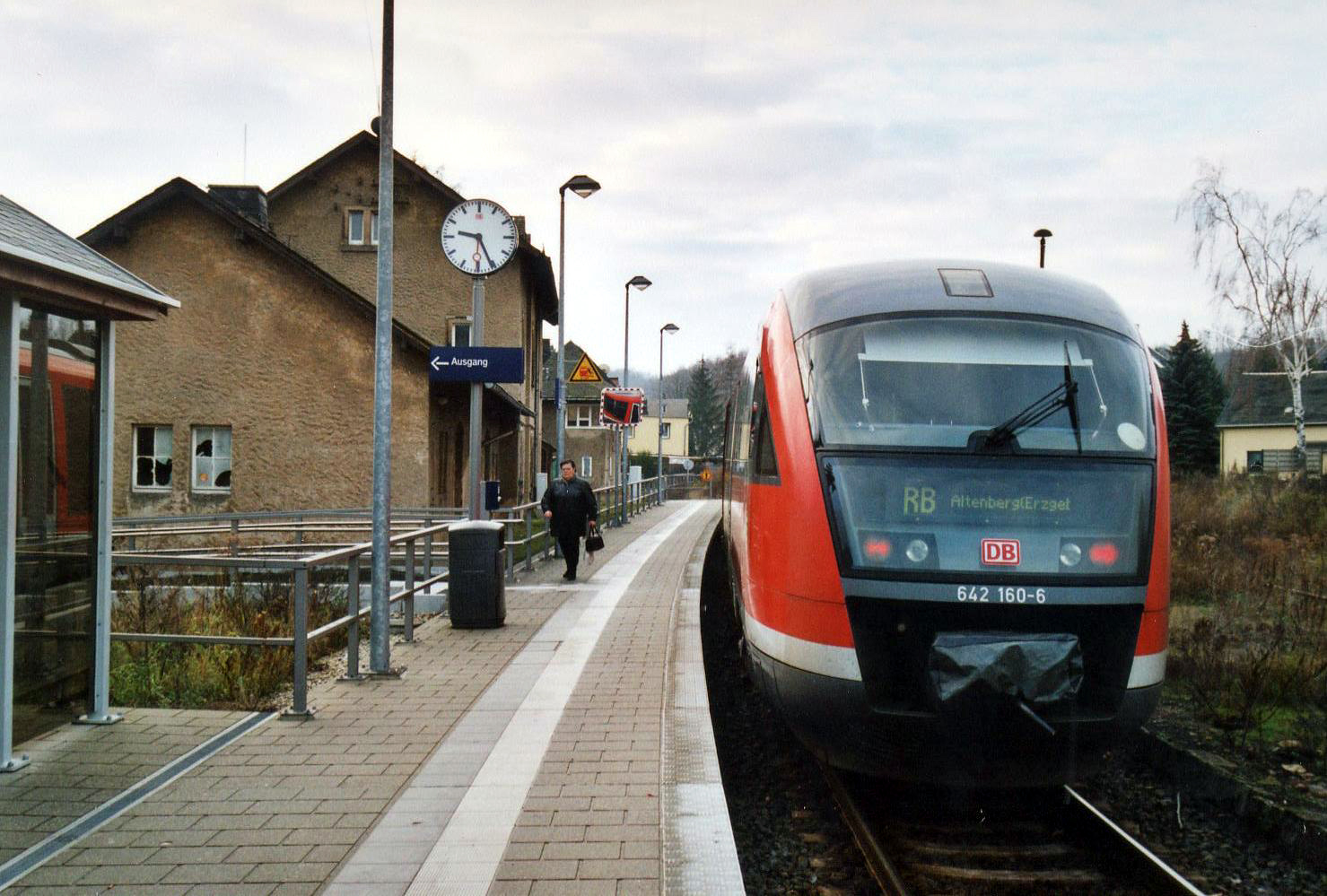
Dohna (Sachs) station

Dohna (Sachs) station still has the entrance building from the narrow gauge period. Because of its great importance for passenger traffic, Dohna was integrated into the Dresden S-Bahn fare zone before German reunification. At times, the station, which is located in the Dohna lower town, was also planned as the terminus of an S-Bahn service, but this was not implemented.

Dohna Fluorchemie siding (50°56′48″N 13°51′26″E)

The Dohna Fluorchemie siding is located beyond Dohna station just before Köttewitz station. The siding leading to a chemical plant in Dohna is the only one on the line still used for freight traffic.

Köttewitz (50.944977°N 13.860336°E)

Köttewitz halt (German: Haltepunkt, that is a station without any points) is located just outside the town. Köttewitz is only a request stop because of the extremely low volume of passengers. From 10 December 2011 to 14 December 2013, Köttewitz was not served to save time in order to improve connections in Heidenau to the trains on line S1. Instead, a special bus served this halt from Heidenau or Mühlbach. The halt is beyond the approach signal to Dohna station and is thus operationally part of Dohna station.

Weesenstein (50°56′10″N 13°51′46″E)

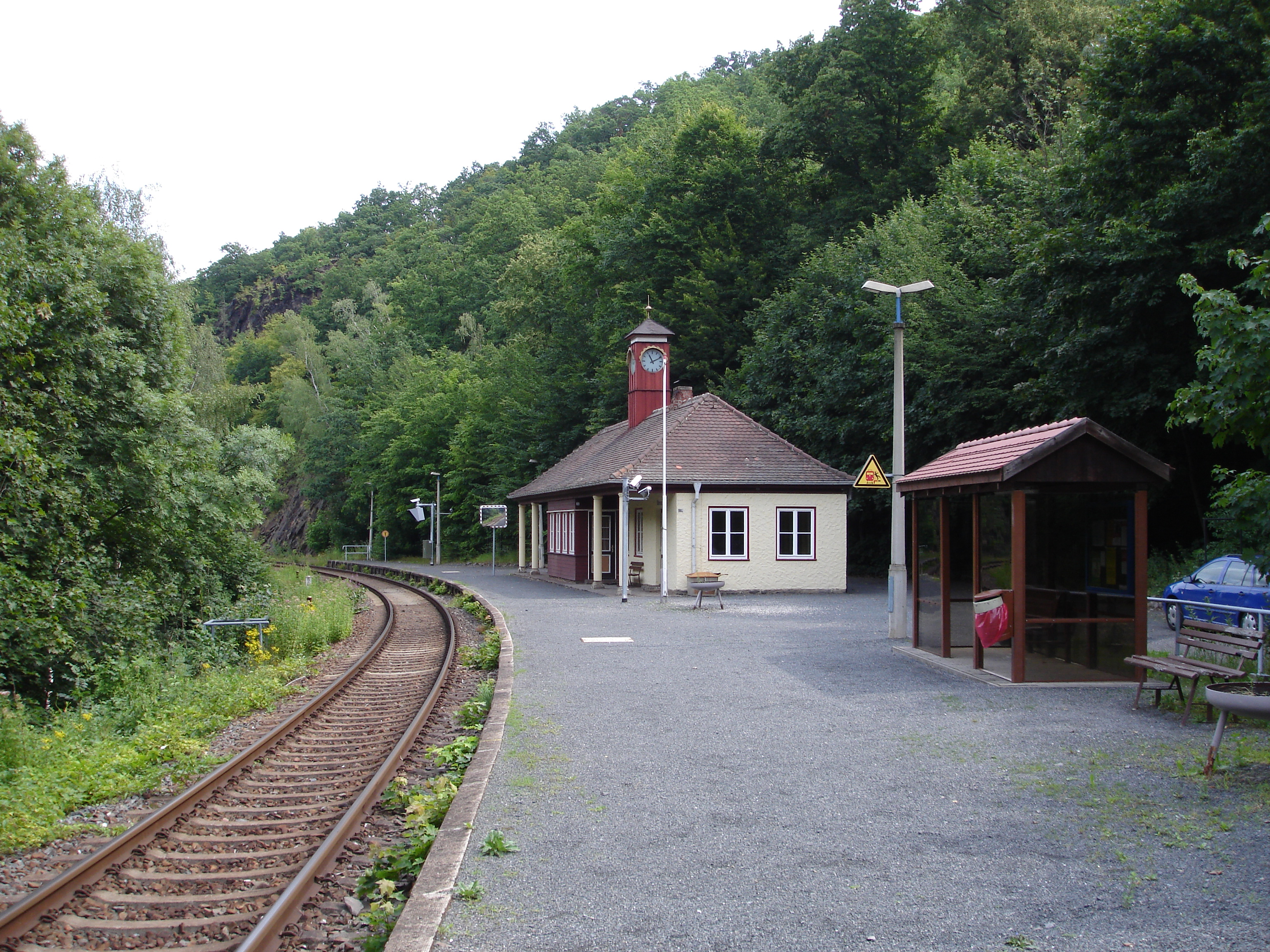
Weesenstein station (2008)

Weesenstein halt is now only a demand stop. The small service building is owned by Deutsche Bahn AG. The entrance building dates back to 1938.

Burkhardswalde-Maxen (50°55′31″N 13°50′19″E)

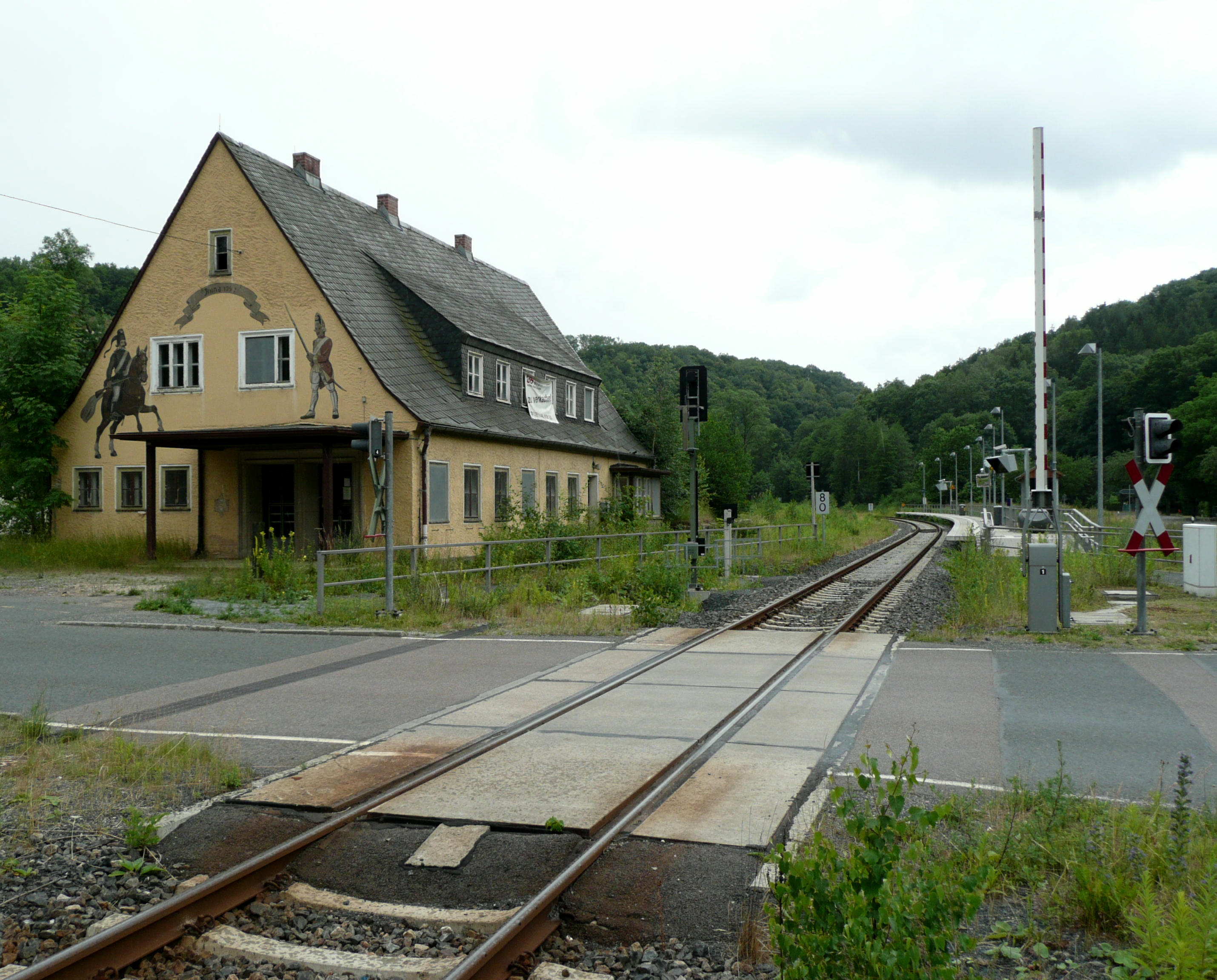
Burkhardswalde-Maxen station (2008)

Burkhardswalde-Maxen halt is located just outside the villages of Burkhardswalde and Maxen. Today it has little traffic. Directly on the slope above the station are the formerly well-known Margon mineral water (Margonwasser) springs and the attached Schloss Gesundbrunnen ("healthy spring palace"). In the course of the restoration the line in 1998/99, the former station was restored as a halt.

The station building, which is heritage listed, is mainly known for its sgraffito decorations on its gable. These have their background in some events of the Seven Years' War that took place nearby. After the Battle of Maxen on 20 November 1759, the Prussian General von Finck surrendered and was captured by the Austrians, who were allied with Saxony, together with 14,000 men. Pictured are a Saxon grenadier and a Prussian Freikorps knight and above is the inscription "Anno 1759". In 2002, the flood waters of the Müglitz destroyed the station building's rear wooden freight platform. The structure was then demolished and not rebuilt.

Deutsche Bahn has offered the station building for sale for a few years, but so far without success. The building is empty and decaying.

Mühlbach (b Pirna) (50°54′51″N 13°49′08″E) The current Mühlbach (b Pirna) halt is in an almost identical position to the station on the narrow gauge line. It was originally called Häselich after the neighbouring small village and was later called Häselich-Mühlbach. Since 15 May 1938, it has borne the present name.

The layout originally consisted of a continuous railway track with a platform and a loading track, which was connected at both ends, which was not included in the standardisation. The originally wooden waiting room was replaced in 1938 by a more formal, significantly enlarged building in the Heimatstil (“homeland style”, a German revivalist style), which is now used for residential purposes. During 1998/99, the separate passenger tracks were moved a few metres towards Heidenau and are no longer connected to the line.

Niederschlottwitz (50°53′23″N 13°48′40″E)

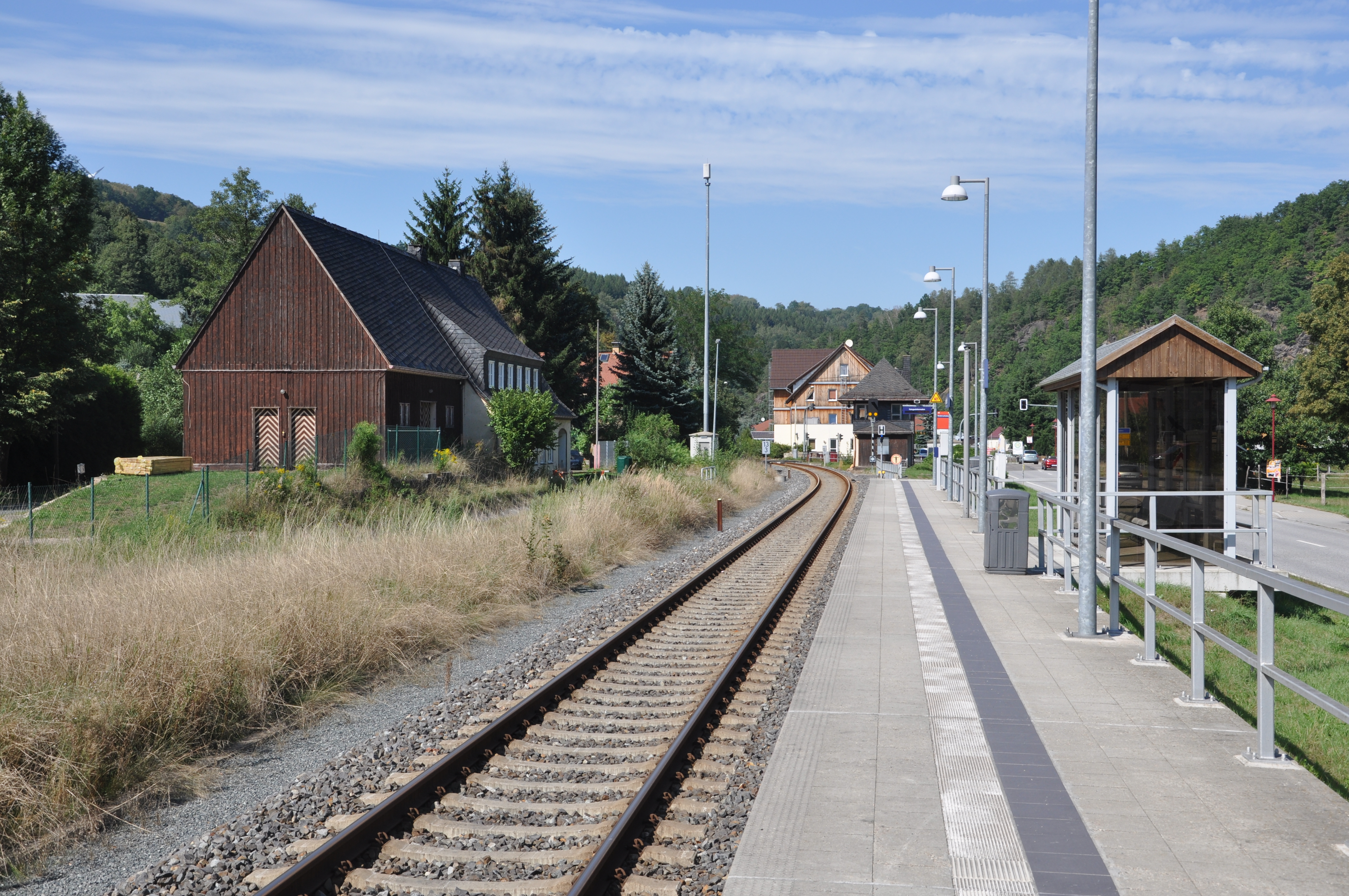
Niederschlottwitz station (2015)

The former Niederschlottwitz station, now classified as a halt was built in 1938 on the site of the narrow-gauge station. The entrance building is almost the same as in Burkhardswalde and Bärenstein. The sgraffito on the gable represents a peasant couple that was typical for the area. The signal box was built in a contemporary style.

Niederschlottwitz was reclassified in 1999 after the extension of the second station track as a halt with block post. The elevated signal box served until the 2002 flood to protect the signal block and the neighbouring level crossing. The block post was not re-established after the flood and an automatic system is now used to secure the line.

Oberschlottwitz (50°52′14″N 13°48′52″E)

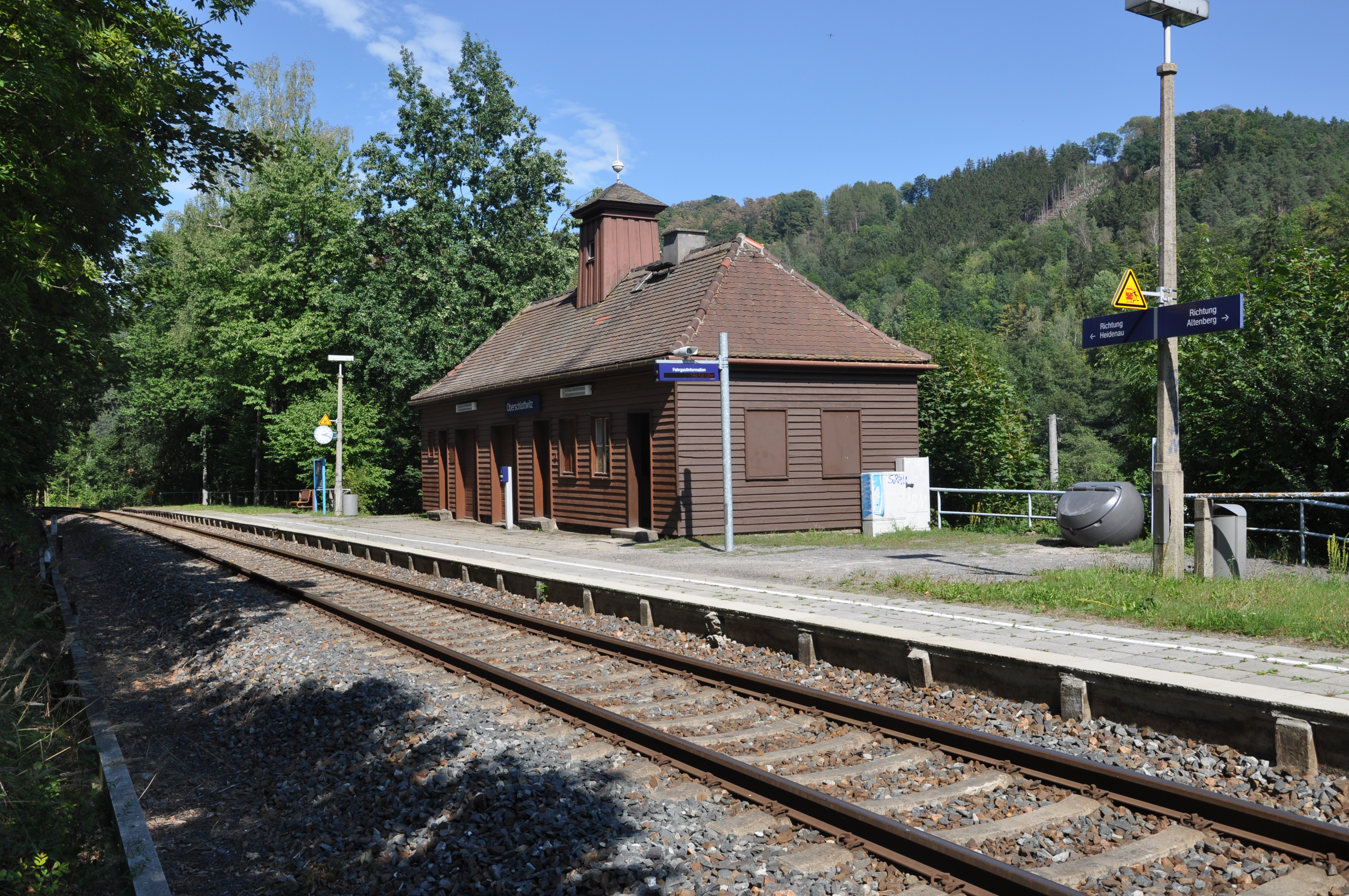
Oberschlottwitz station

Oberschwottwitz halt was established in 1938 on the slope before the Müglitz Viaduct and is sited approximately on the location of the former narrow gauge station. The small, massive entrance building is built in the Heimatstil and is now unused.

Glashütte (Sachs) (50°51′05″N 13°46′57″E)

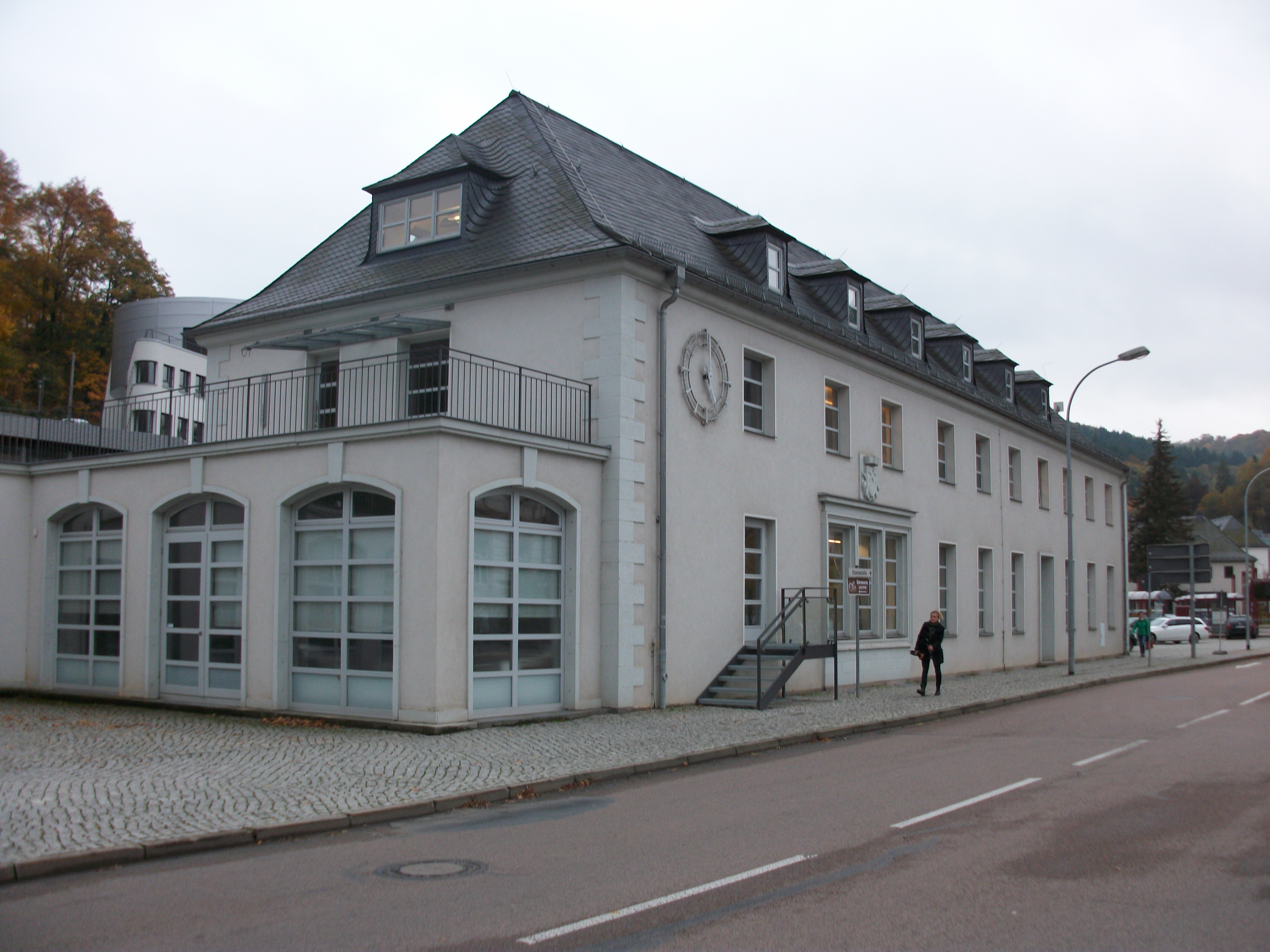
Glashütte (Sachs) station

Glashütte (Sachs) station is now the only station on the line with a passing loop. When the new building was built in 1938, the entire station area was raised above flood level. A new entrance building was built; it now serves as Nomos Glashütte’s headquarters and production site.

Bärenhecke-Johnsbach (50°49′38″N 13°46′18″E)

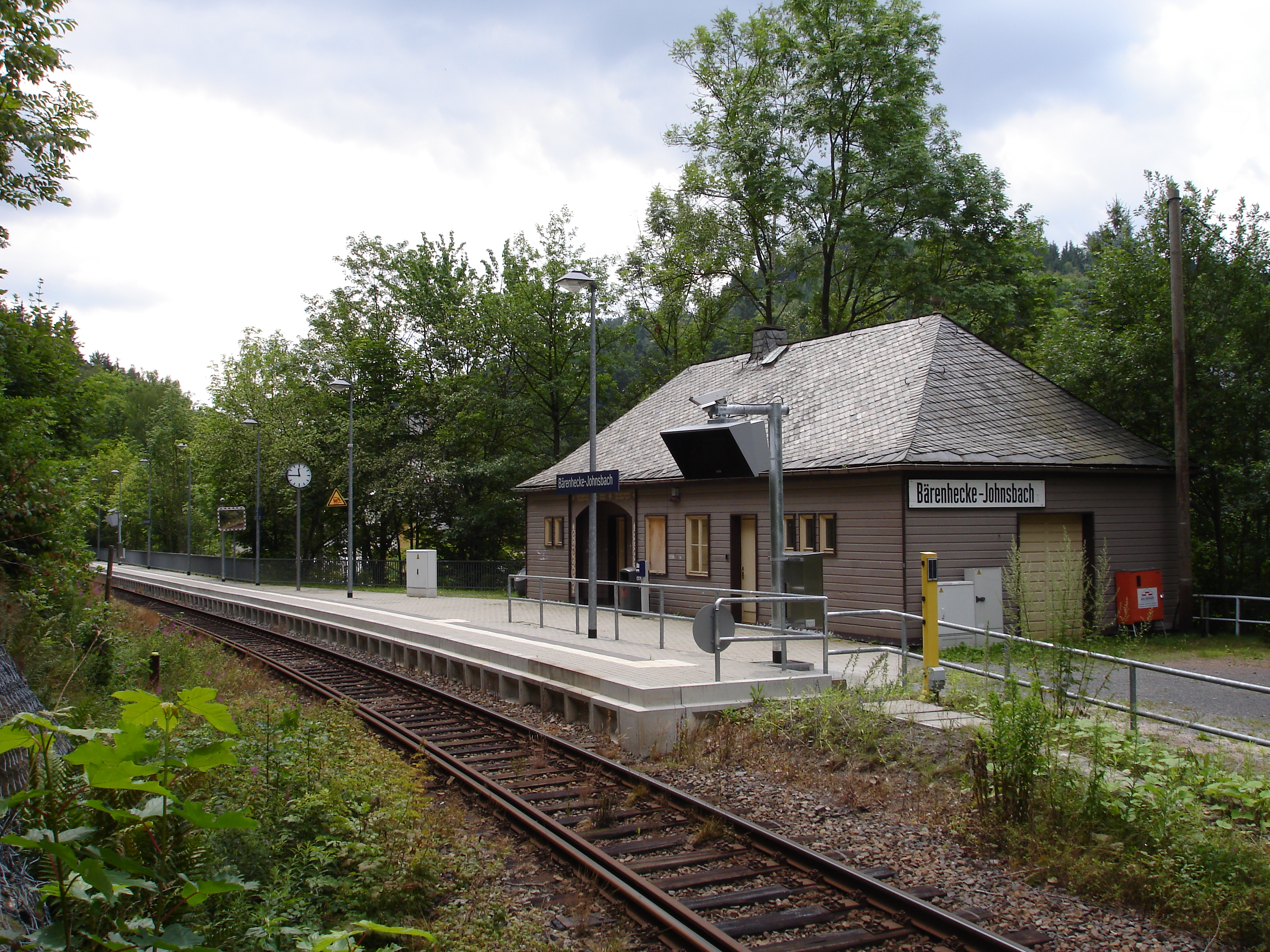
Bärenhecke-Johnsbach station

Bärenhecke-Johnsbach halt is located near the village of Bärenhecke, on the opposite side of the Müglitz, but has a very limited passenger traffic because of its great distance from the much larger village of Johnsbach. At the end of the 1990s, the entrance to the Bärenhecke mill and bakery was located at the stop.

Bärenstein (b Glashütte/Sachs) (50°48′34″N 13°47′41″E)

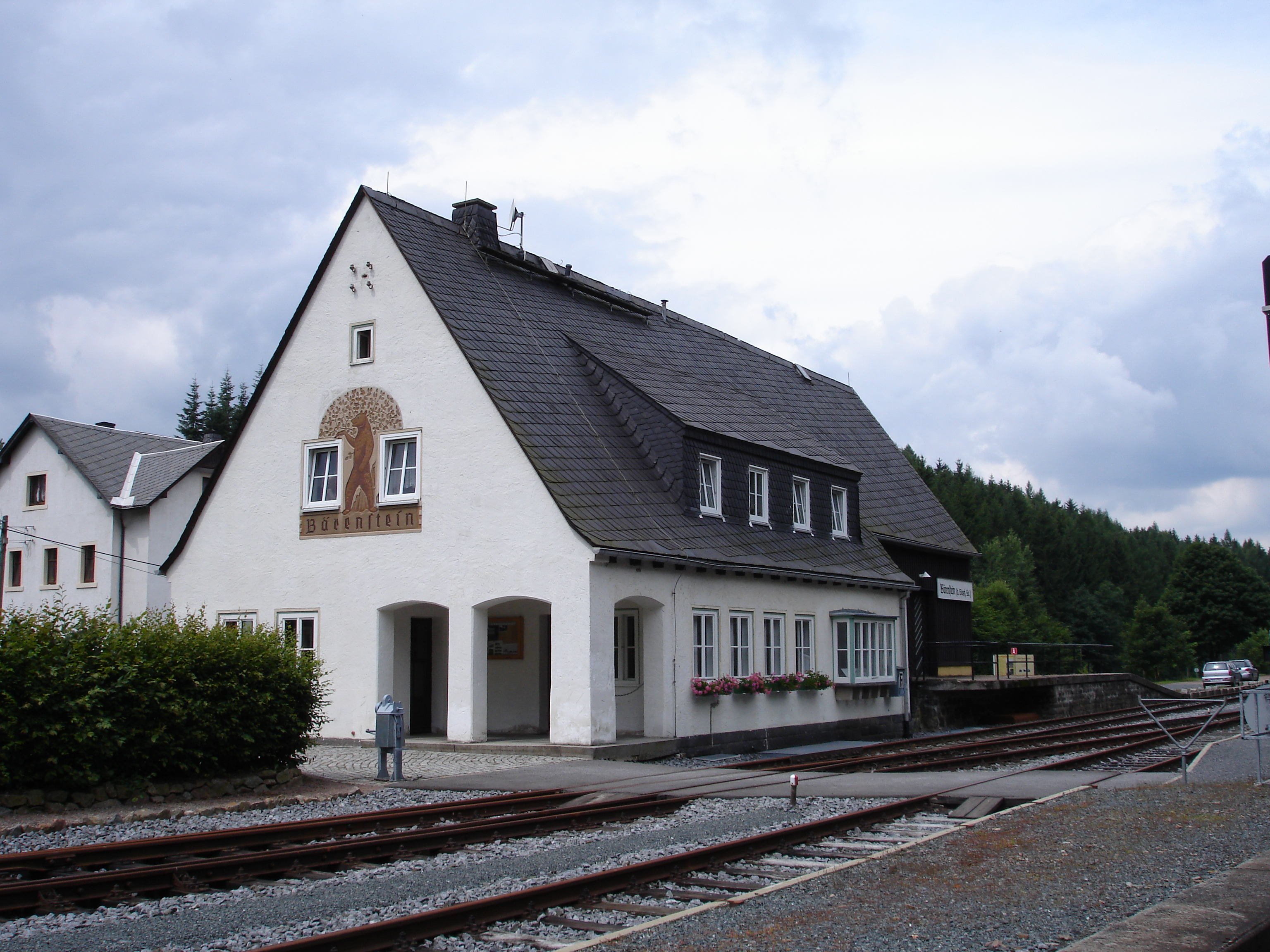
Bärenstein station (2008)

The Förderverein für die Müglitztalbahn eV (“supporting association for the Müglitz Valley Railway”, which developed the station precincts into a museum with several buildings, had its headquarters in the "Bärenstein" station. After the insolvency of the association, the entrance building is now privately owned. Officially, the station is connected to an industrial spur, so that regular use by museum trains is possible. It is notable for having a waterhouse (for supplying water for steam trains) from the narrow-gauge era, which is the oldest in Saxony and which is still operational. A similar building exists in all of Saxony only at Burkhardswalde-Maxen halt and on the Pressnitz Valley Railway in Steinbach.

Lauenstein (Sachs) (50°47′10″N 13°48′52″E)

The current Lauenstein (Sachs) halt was classified as a station until 1998/99, before it was an important passing point on the upper part of the line.

Hartmannmühle (50°46′42″N 13°47′32″E)

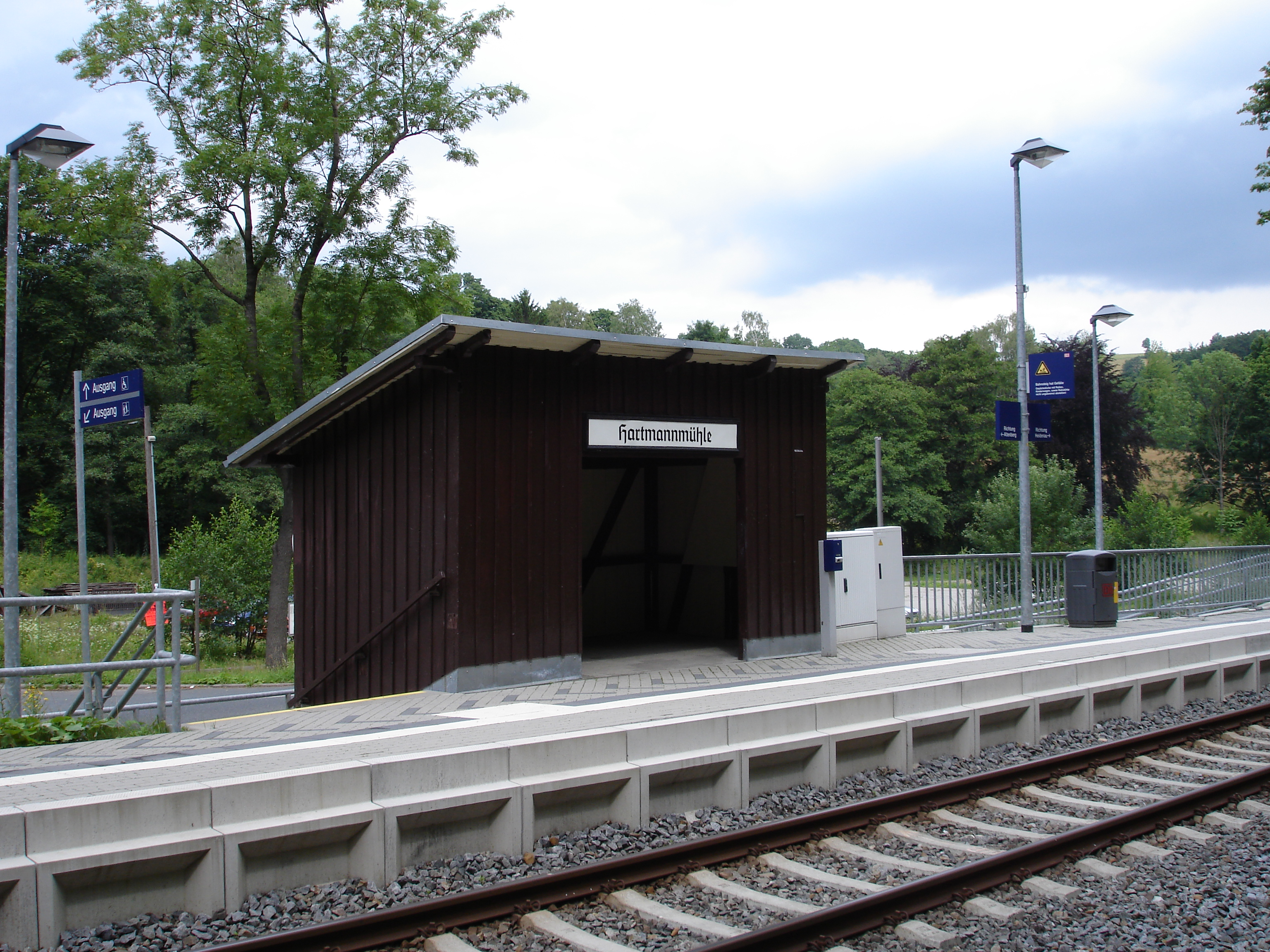
Hartmannmühle station (2008)

It is still possible to find the wooden waiting room from the narrow-gauge era at Hartmannmühle halt. The Wildpark Osterzgebirge tourist attraction now lies opposite the stop. Because of the low traffic, Hartmannmühle is now only a request stop.

Geising (50°45′39″N 13°47′14″E)

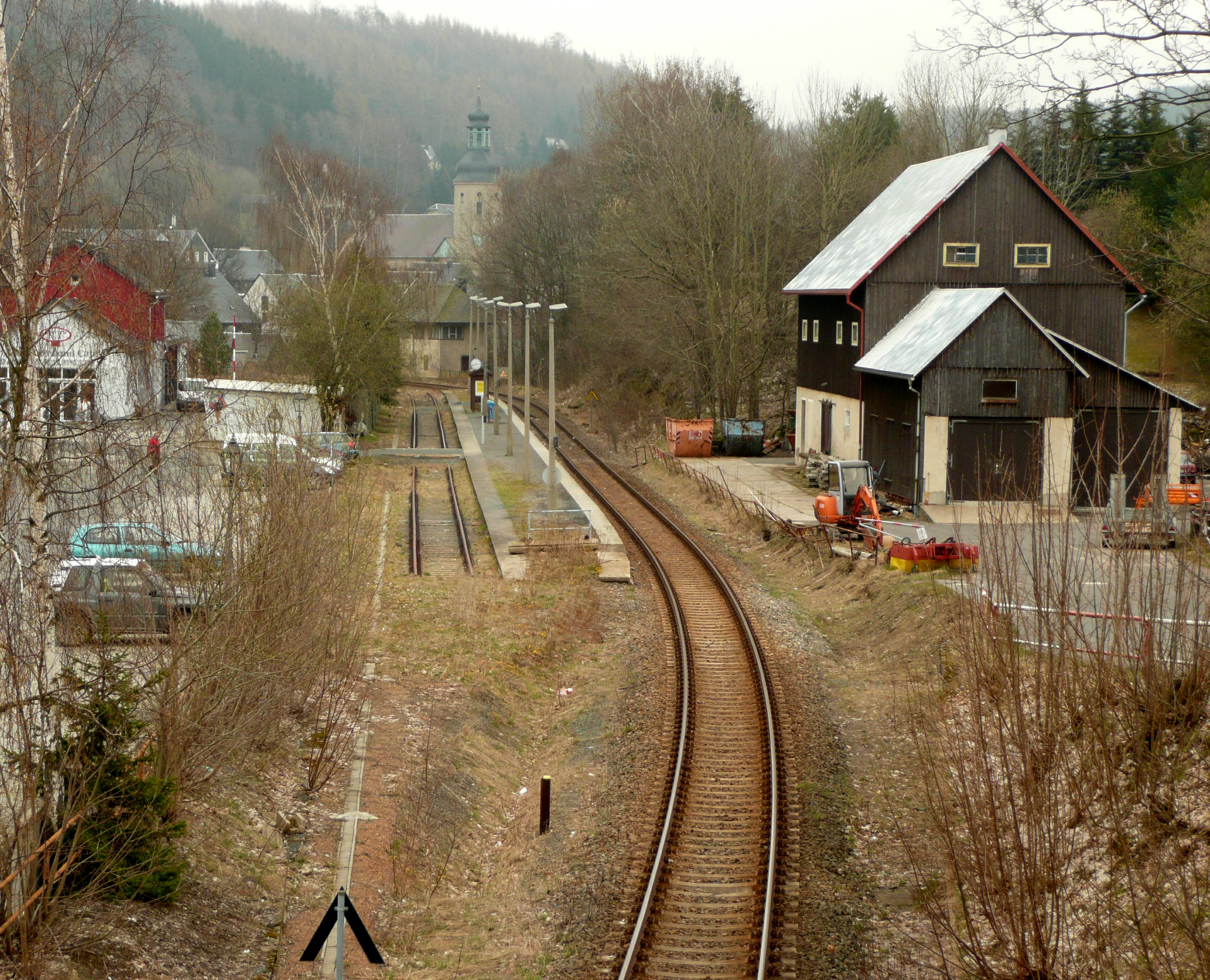
Geising station

The current Geising halt was the terminus of the narrow-gauge line until 1923 and called Geising-Altenberg station. In October 1966, Geising station was flooded with a mud and boulder wave that had escaped due to a damage to the drainage system of the washing plant of VEB Zinnerz Altenberg. The station was then returned to the station and the signal box was left open. The entrance building dates back to the narrow-gauge period. The only change with standardisation of the line in 1938 was the addition of a spacious waiting room. Today it is used for commercial purposes.

Geisingberg-Sprungschanze

The "Geisingberg-Sprungschanze" halt was only open between 1933 and 1941. It was only served at sporting events on the ski jumping hill on the Geisingberg.

Kurort Altenberg (Erzgeb) (50°46′00″N 13°45′15″E)

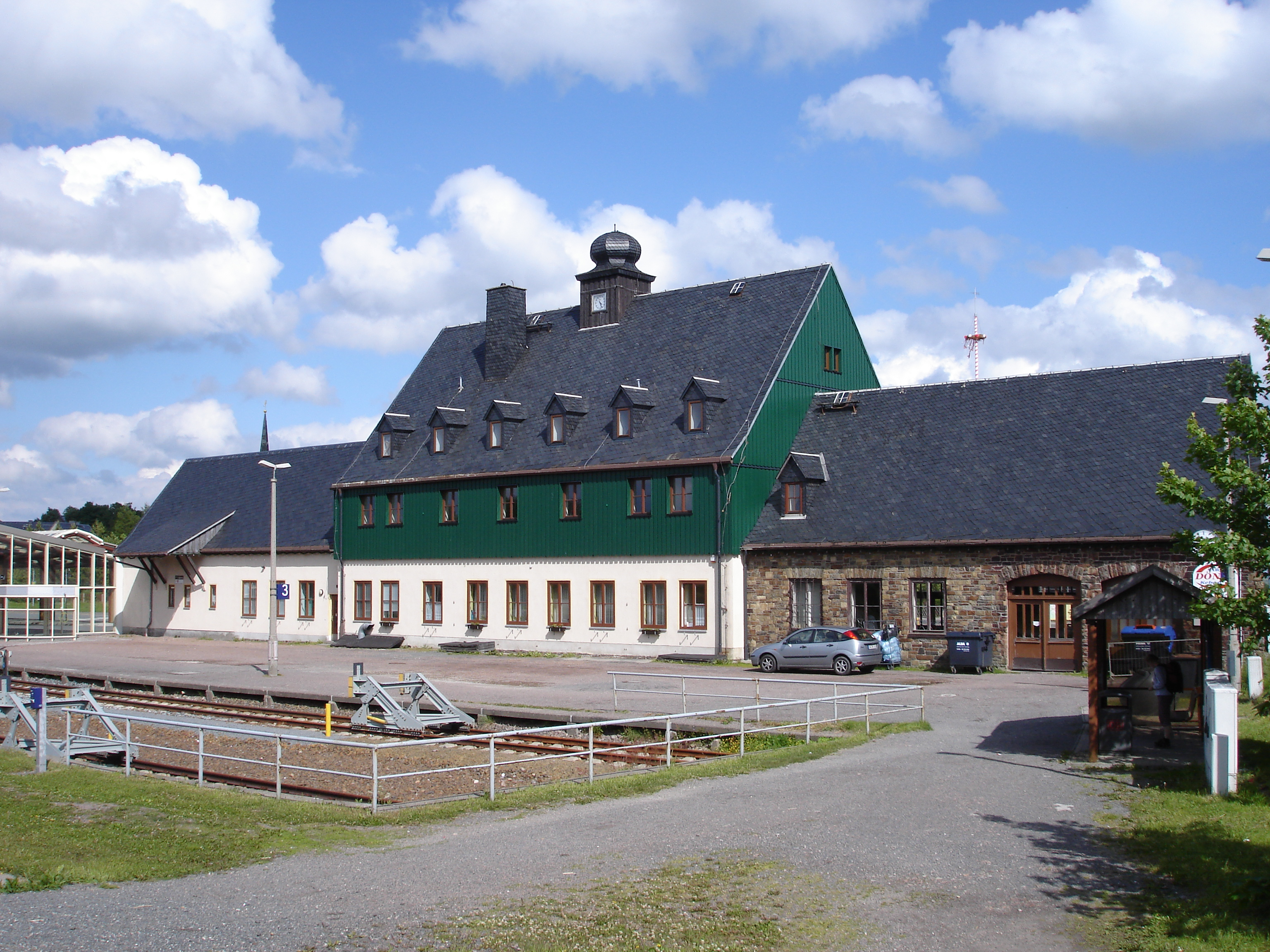
Kurort Altenberg station (2009)

Kurort Altenberg station is the terminus of the Müglitz Valley Railway. It was built in 1938 at the same place as the old narrow-gauge station, however with a change in the angle of the tracks. Originally there were four platforms for winter sports, which were reduced to three after the 1999 rehabilitation of the track. The station has a covered structure that directly links to the suburban bus stop, which can also be used as a conference hall. The entrance building, which was destroyed in 1945 and later rebuilt, now belongs to the town of Altenberg, which uses it as a centre for tourist information and the operation of a cross-country ski trail.

Platform 1 was developed in 2013 with the federal funds from the Schienenwegeausbaugesetz (“railways extension act). It was raised to a platform height of 55 centimetres above the top edge of the rail and a given guidance system for the blind. The cost was over €240,000.
