= Städtebahn Sachsen =

- Franchise(s): Diesel network in Saxony, Germany; 12 December 2010 - December 2014; December 2014 - December 2024, terminated early in July 2019
- Main region(s): Saxony
- Fleet: 15 Siemens Desiro Classic
- Parent company: Eisenbahngesellschaft Potsdam; Nordbayerische Eisenbahngesellschaft

Other
- Website: www.staedtebahn-sachsen.de

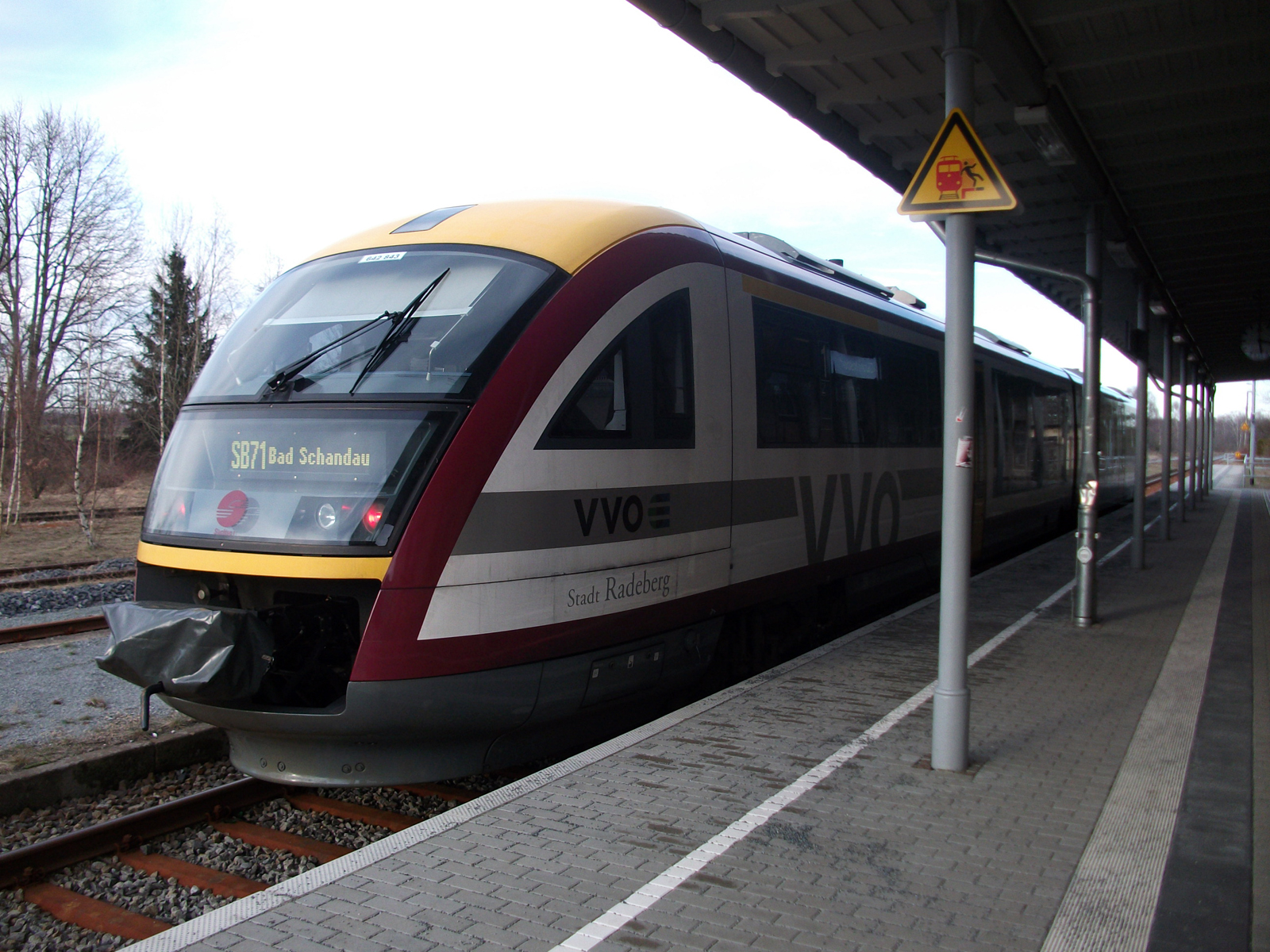
Siemens Desiro of Städtebahn Sachsen at Dürrröhrsdorf station (SB 71)

The Städtebahn Sachsen was a railway company that operated regional train services in Saxony, Germany by order of Verkehrsverbund Oberelbe. Städtebahn was a subsidiary of Nordbayerische Eisenbahngesellschaft (NBE) and started its operations in 2010.

On 25 July 2019, Städtebahn ceased all its services due to financial difficulties, resulting in the leasing contract of the rolling stock being terminated by the rolling stock owner. After 72 hours of no trains, Verkehrsverbund Oberelbe terminated the contract with Städtebahn to operate regional trains (due to run until 2024), and Mitteldeutsche Regiobahn took over.

== Services ==
Route map as of December 11, 2016

- RE19 (Wintersport Express) Dresden Hbf – Heidenau – Glashütte (Sachs) – Kurort Altenberg (Erzgebirge)
  - partly along Děčín–Dresden-Neustadt railway
  - along Heidenau–Kurort Altenberg railway
  - service only during winter season
- RB33 Dresden-Neustadt – Königsbrück
  - partly along Görlitz–Dresden railway
  - partly along Dresden-Klotzsche–Straßgräbchen-Bernsdorf railway
  - daily service
- RB34 Dresden Hbf – Kamenz
  - partly along Děčín–Dresden-Neustadt railway
  - partly along Görlitz–Dresden railway
  - partly along Kamenz–Pirna railway
  - daily service
- RB71 Pirna – Neustadt (Sachs) – Sebnitz
  - partly along Kamenz–Pirna railway (Dürröhrsdorf–Pirna section)
  - along Neustadt–Dürrröhrsdorf railway
  - partly along Bautzen–Bad Schandau railway (Neustadt–Sebnitz section)
  - daily service
- RB72 Heidenau – Mühlbach bei Pirna – Glashütte (Sachs) – Geising – Kurort Altenberg (Erzgebirge)
  - along Heidenau–Kurort Altenberg railway
  - daily service
