= Heidenau station =

Railway station in Heidenau, Germany

Heidenau
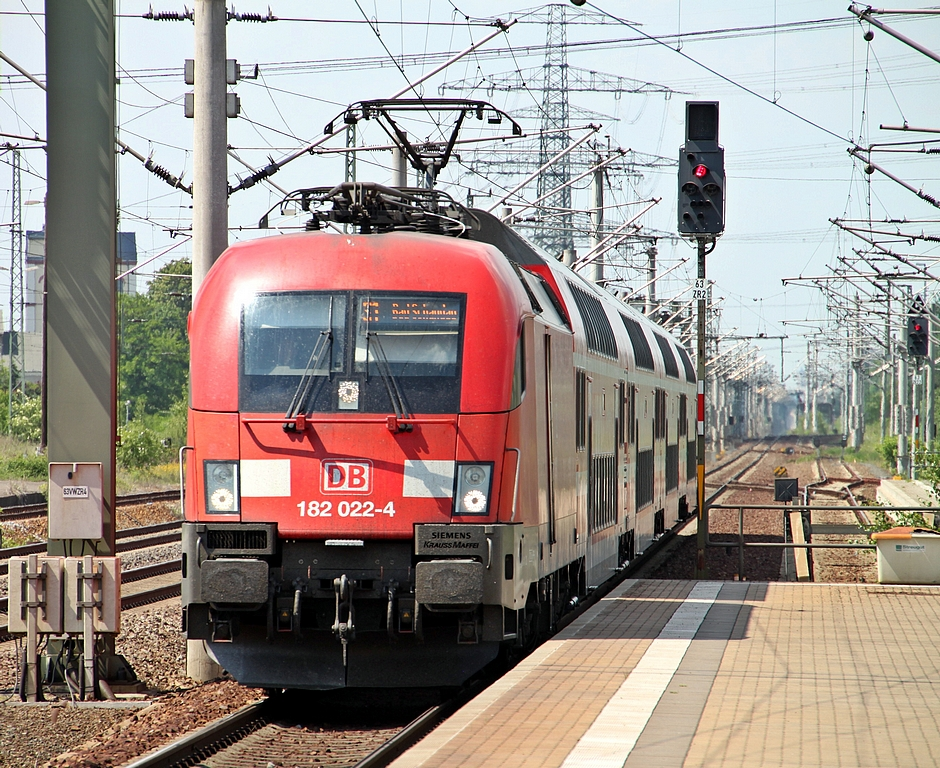
- Heidenau station

General information
- Location: Heidenau, Saxony; Germany
- Coordinates: 50°58′52″N 13°51′29″E
- Lines: Děčín–Dresden-Neustadt railway; Müglitz Valley Railway; Pirna–Coswig railway
- Platforms: 6
- Tracks: 10

Services
Preceding station	Dresden S-Bahn	Following station
Dresden-Zschachwitz towards Meißen Triebischtal	S 1	Heidenau Süd towards Schöna
Dresden-Zschachwitz towards Dresden Flughafen	S 2	Heidenau Süd towards Pirna
Preceding station	DB Regio Südost	Following station
Dresden-Zschachwitz towards Dresden Hbf	RE 19	Dohna (Sachs) towards Kurort Altenberg (Erzgebirge)
Terminus	RB 72	Dohna (Sachs) towards Kurort Altenberg (Erzgebirge)
Dresden-Niedersedlitz towards Dresden Hbf	RE 20	Pirna towards Litoměřice město
Location
- Location within Saxony

Heidenau (German: Bahnhof Heidenau) is a railway station in the town of Heidenau, Saxony, Germany. The station lies on the Děčín–Dresden-Neustadt railway and Müglitz Valley Railway and the train services are operated by DB Regio Südost (most as Dresden S-Bahn services).

== Train services ==
The station is served by the following service(s):

- 2x per day regional service (Wanderexpress Bohemica, summer weekends only) Dresden - Pirna - Bad Schandau - Děčín - Ústí nad Labem - Litoměřice
- 1x per hour regional service (Müglitztalbahn) Heidenau - Glashütte - Altenberg
- 2x per day regional service (Wintersport Express, winter weekends only) Dresden - Heidenau - Glashütte - Altenberg
- 2x per hour S-Bahn S1 Meißen Triebischtal - Dresden - Pirna - Bad Schandau - Schöna
- 2x per hour S-Bahn S2 Dresden Flughafen - Dresden - Pirna
