= Kurort Altenberg (Erzgebirge) station =

Railway station in Altenberg, Germany

Altenberg (Erzgebirge)
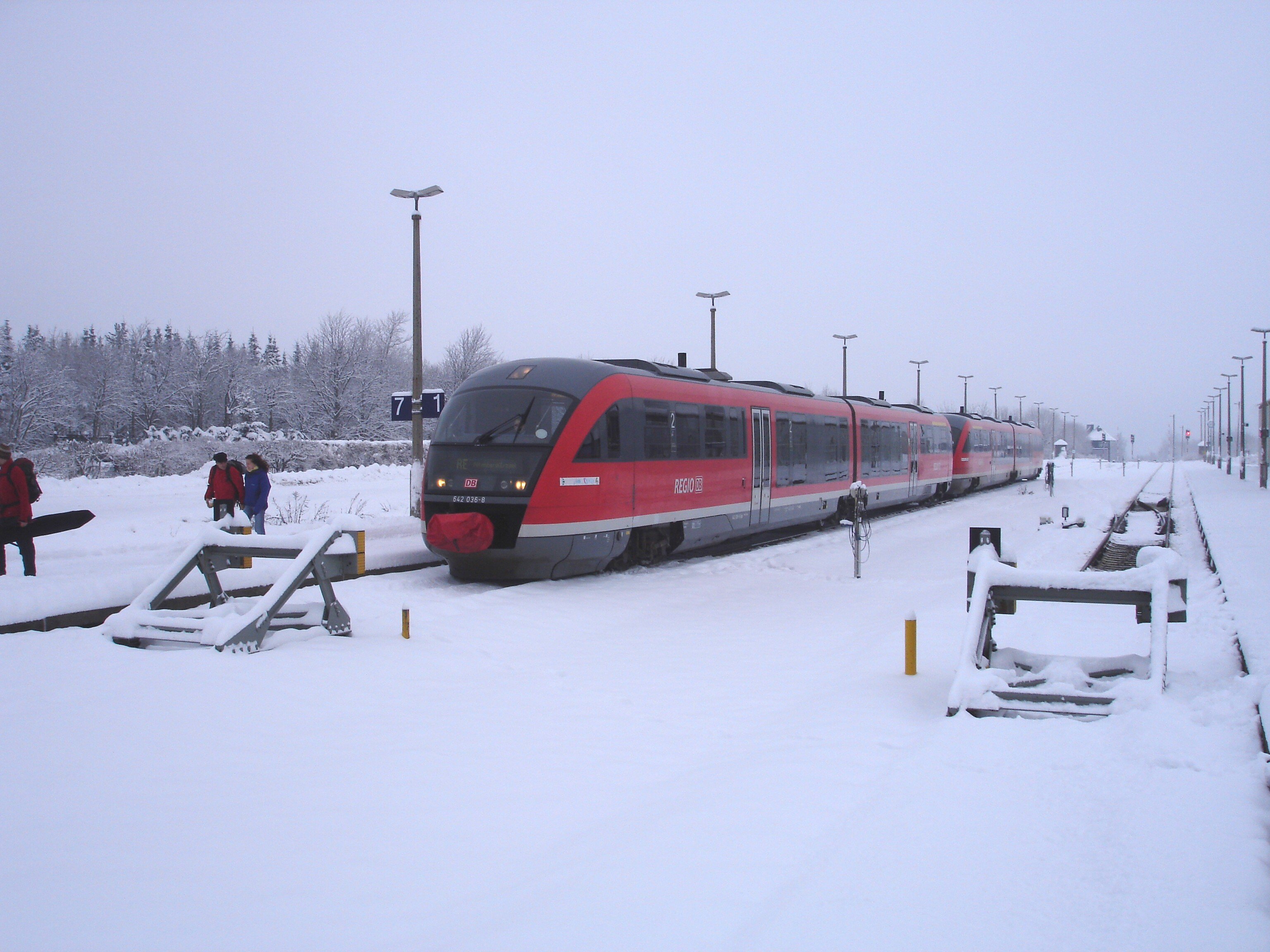
- Altenberg (Erzgebirge) railway station

General information
- Location: Altenberg, Saxony, Germany
- Coordinates: 50°45′57″N 13°45′11″E
- Line: Müglitz Valley Railway
- Platforms: 3
- Tracks: 4

Services
Preceding station	DB Regio Südost	Following station
Geising towards Dresden Hbf	RE 19	Terminus
Geising towards Heidenau	RB 72	Terminus
Location
- Location within Saxony

Altenberg (Erzgebirge) (German: Bahnhof Altenberg) is a railway station in the town of Altenberg, Saxony, Germany. The station lies on the Müglitz Valley Railway and the train services are operated by DB Regio Südost.

== Train services ==
The station is served by the following service(s):

- 2x per day regional service (Wanderexpress Bohemica, summer weekends only) Dresden - Heidenau - Glashütte - Altenberg
- 1x per hour regional service (Müglitztalbahn) Heidenau - Glashütte - Altenberg
