= Greifenbach =

River in Germany

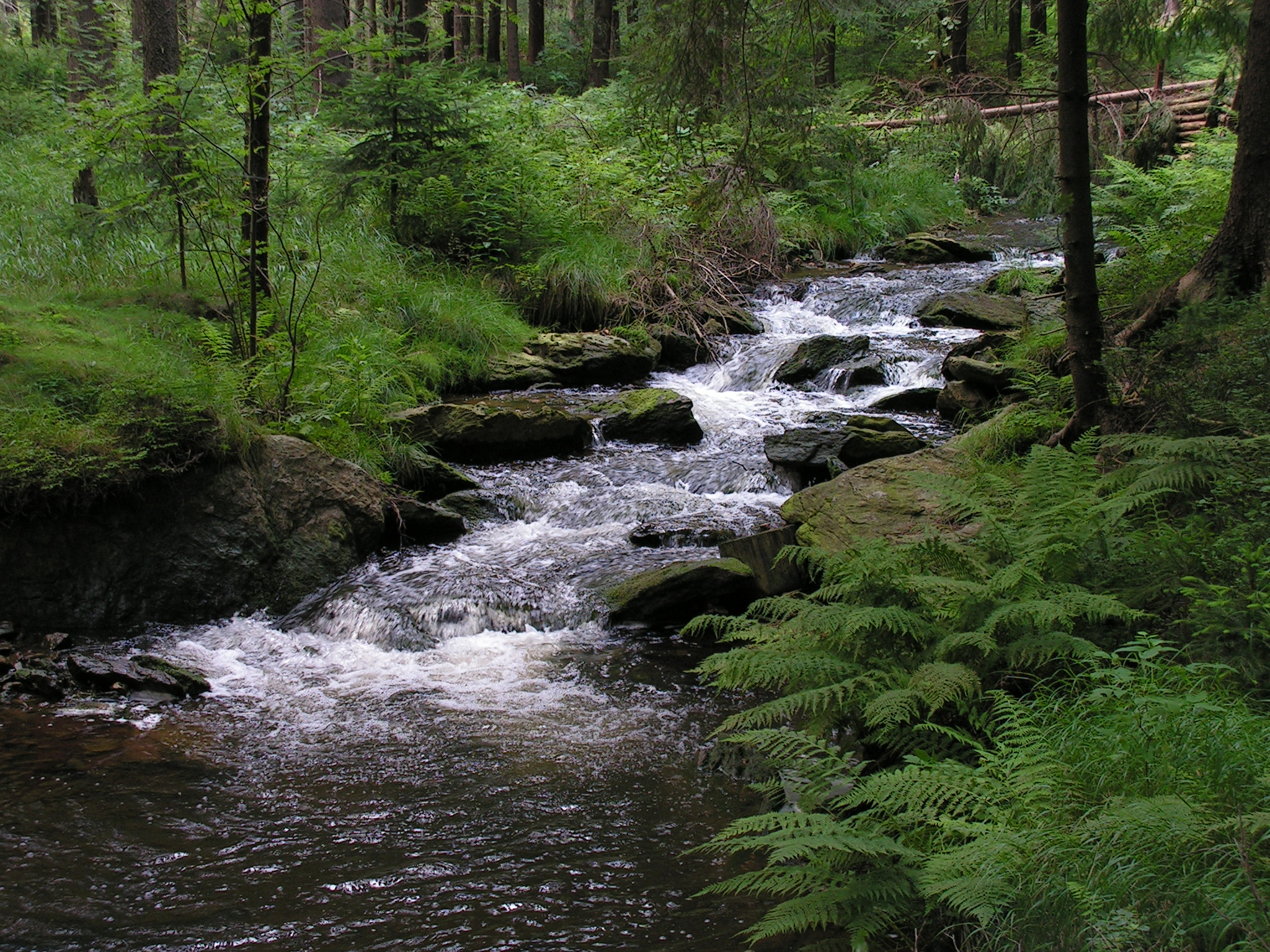

Location
- Country: Germany
- States: Saxony

Physical characteristics
- Mouth
  - location: Zschopau
  - coordinates: 50.6103°N 12.9634°E

Basin features
- Progression: Zschopau→ Freiberger Mulde→ Mulde→ Elbe→ North Sea

The Greifenbach is a river in Saxony, Germany. It is a left tributary of the Zschopau, which it joins near Tannenberg.

== See also ==
- List of rivers of Saxony
