= Armorial of Sächsische Schweiz-Osterzgebirge =

This list shows the coats of arms of the municipalities in the district of Sächsische Schweiz-Osterzgebirge in the German federal state of Saxony.

Coat of arms of the district of Sächsische Schweiz-Osterzgebirge

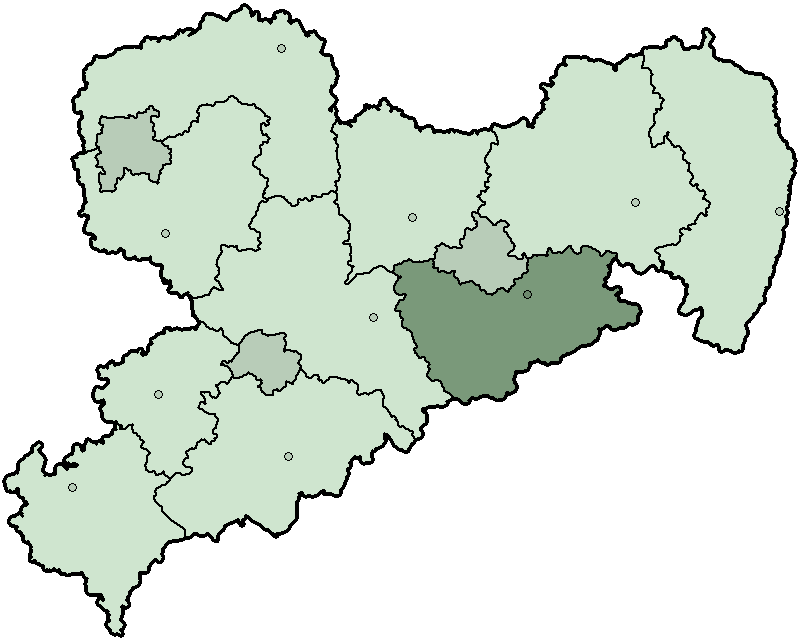
Location of the district of Sächsische Schweiz-Osterzgebirge within Saxony

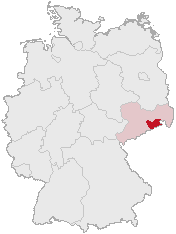
Location of the district of Sächsische Schweiz-Osterzgebirge in Germany

The following municipalities have no coat of arms:

- Lohmen
- Porschdorf
- Rosenthal-Bielatal

== Coats of arms of the towns and municipalities ==
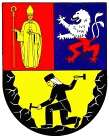
Town of
Altenberg

Town of
Bad Gottleuba-Berggießhübel

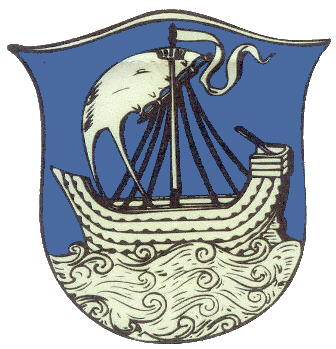
Town of
Bad Schandau

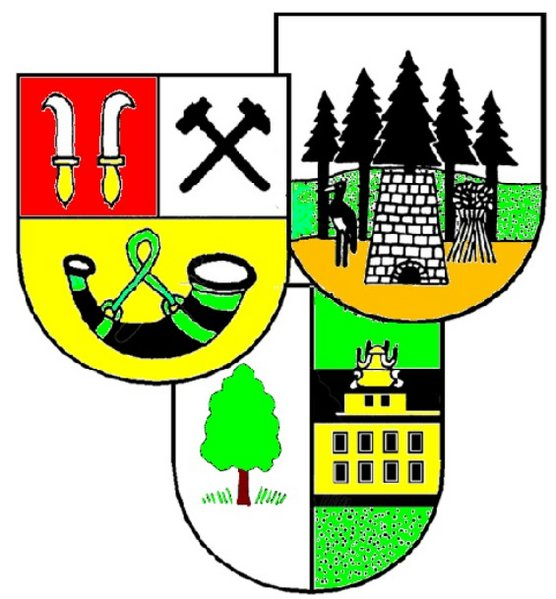
Municipality of
Bahretal

Municipality of
Bannewitz

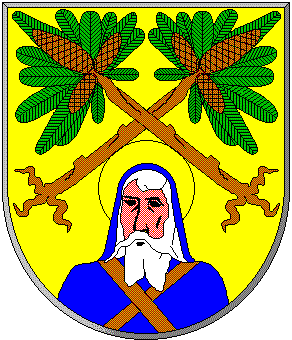
Town of
Dippoldiswalde

Municipality of
Dohma

Town of
Dohna

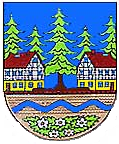
Municipality of
Dorfhain

Municipality of
Dürrröhrsdorf-Dittersbach

Town of
Freital

Town of
Glashütte

Municipality of
Gohrisch

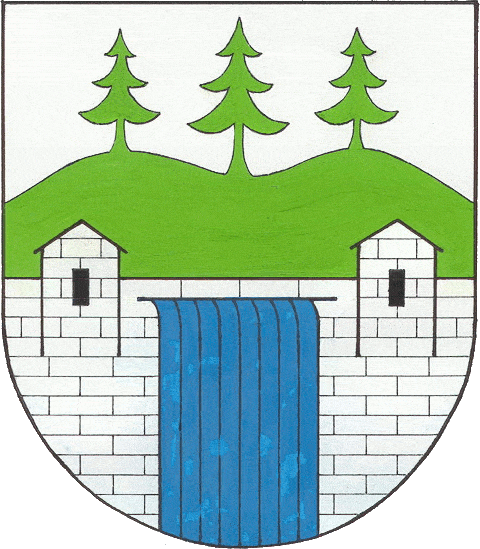
Municipality of
Hartmannsdorf-Reichenau

Town of
Heidenau

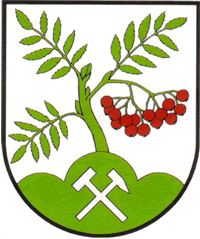
Municipality of
Hermsdorf/Erzgeb.

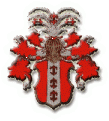
Municipality of
Höckendorf

Town of
Hohnstein

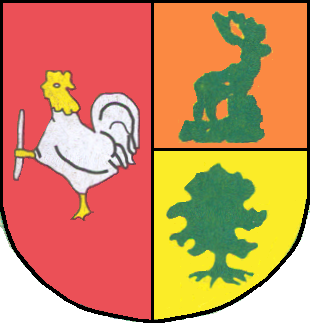
Municipality of
Kirnitzschtal

Town of
Königstein

Municipality of
Kreischa

Town of
Liebstadt

Municipality of
Müglitztal

Town of
Neustadt in Sachsen

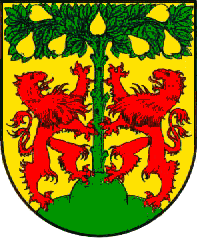
Town of
Pirna

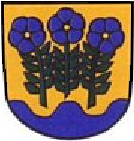
Municipality of
Pretzschendorf

Town of
Rabenau

Municipality of
Kurort Rathen

Municipality of
Rathmannsdorf

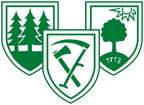
Municipality of
Reinhardtsdorf-Schöna

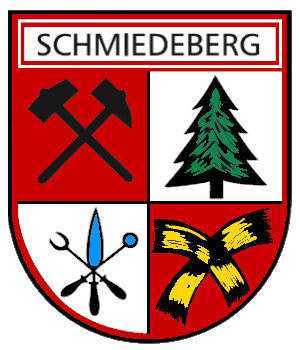
Municipality of
Schmiedeberg

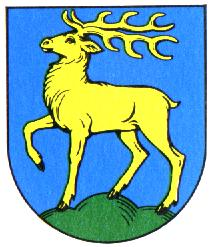
Town of
Sebnitz

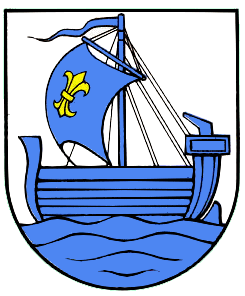
Town of
Wehlen

Town of
Stolpen

Municipality of
Struppen

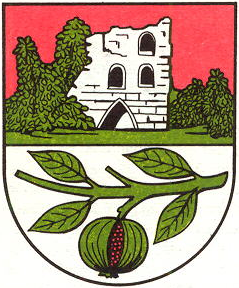
Town of
Tharandt

Town of
Wilsdruff

== Coats of arms of formerly independent municipalities ==
Bad Gottleuba

Bärenstein (Altenberg)

Berggießhübel

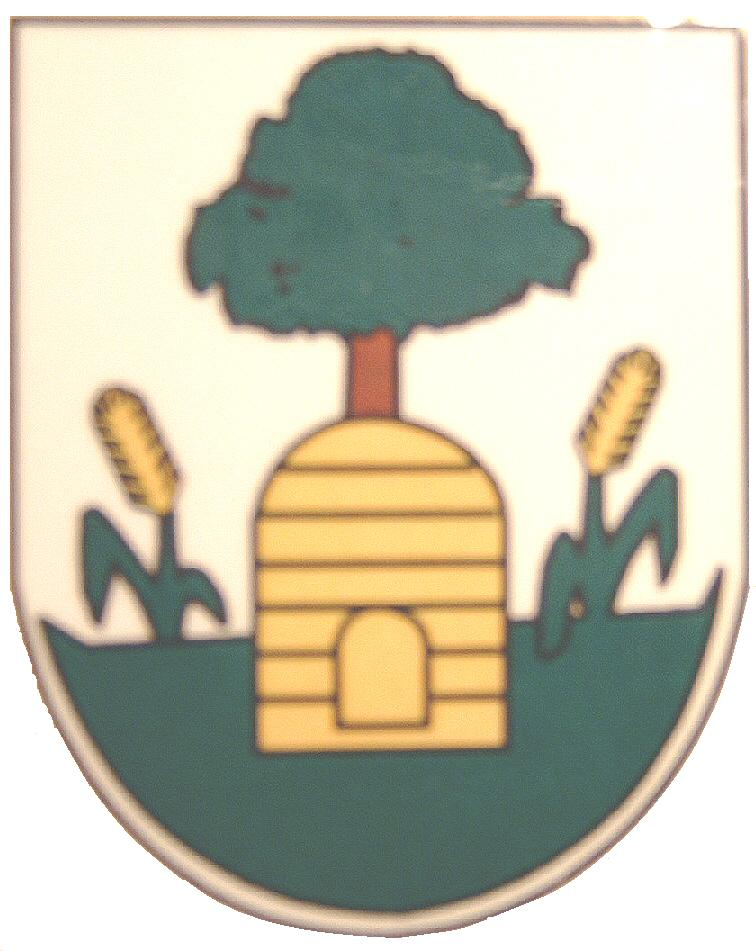
Fördergersdorf

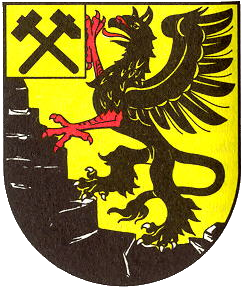
Geising

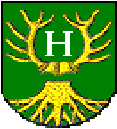
Hohwald (Saxony)

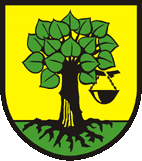
Kesselsdorf

Pesterwitz

Pohrsdorf

Reinhardtsgrimma
Village in the municipality of Glashütte

== Coats of arms of former districts ==
Coat of arms of the district of Sächsische Schweiz

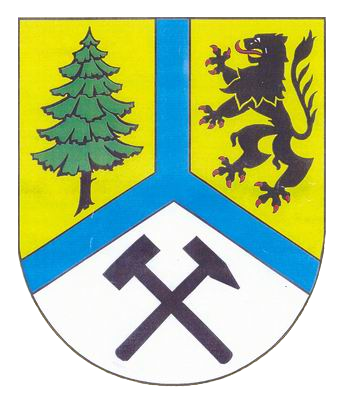
Coat of arms of the district of Weißeritzkreises

== Former coats of arms ==
Municipality of
Dohma
