= Weißeritzkreis =

- District
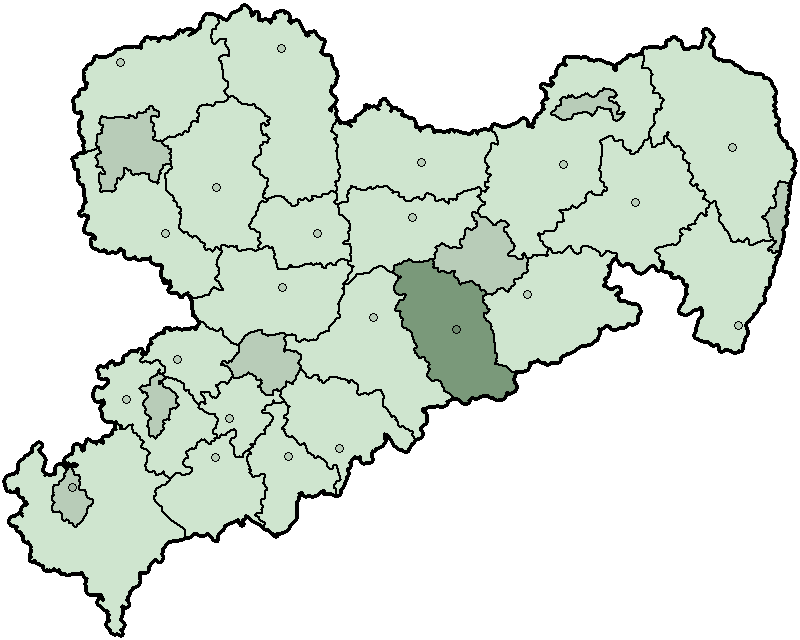
- Country: Germany
- State: Saxony
- Adm. region: Dresden
- Disbanded: 2008-08-01
- Capital: Dippoldiswalde

Area
  - Total: 765 km^{2} (295 sq mi)

Population (2001)
  - Total: 124,091
  - Density: 160/km^{2} (420/sq mi)
- Time zone: UTC+01:00 (CET)
  - Summer (DST): UTC+02:00 (CEST)
- Vehicle registration: DW
- Website: www.weisseritzkreis.com

The Weißeritzkreis is a former district (Kreis) in the south of Saxony, Germany. Neighboring districts were (from west clockwise) Freiberg, Meißen, the district-free city Dresden, Sächsische Schweiz, and to the south it bordered the Czech Republic.

== History ==
The district was created in 1994 when the two districts Dippoldiswalde and Freital were merged. In August 2008, as a part of the district reform in Saxony, the districts of Sächsische Schweiz and Weißeritzkreis were merged into the new district Sächsische Schweiz-Osterzgebirge.

== Geography ==
The district is located in the Ore Mountains, the central part is the Tharandt Forest. The district got its name after the two rivers Wild Weißeritz and Red Weißeritz, who merge near Freital into the Weißeritz river, and then mouths into the Elbe in Dresden. The highest elevation is the Kahleberg at 905 metres (2,969 ft).

During the flooding in August 2002 the Weißeritz river had to drain many times the normal amount of water, and did destroy a lot of buildings in the river valley - houses, streets and bridges.

== Partnerships ==
1. Rottweil
2. Berchtesgadener Land
3. Göttingen
4. Zollernalbkreis

== Coat of arms ==
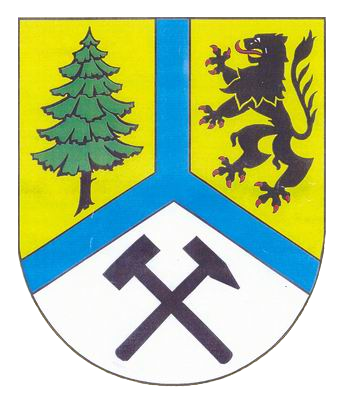
The blue lines symbolize the Weißeritz river, and its splitting into the Wild Weißeritz and the Red Weißeritz rivers. The mining symbol in the bottom represents the old ore and coal mining tradition in the Ore Mountains. The tree stands for the rich forests in the district, and the lion to the right is the symbol of Meißen, as the area historically belonged to the margraviate of Meißen.

== Towns and municipalities ==
Towns
1. Altenberg
2. Dippoldiswalde
3. Freital
4. Geising
5. Glashütte
6. Rabenau
7. Tharandt
8. Wilsdruff
Municipalities
1. Bannewitz
2. Dorfhain
3. Hartmannsdorf-Reichenau
4. Hermsdorf
5. Höckendorf
6. Kreischa
7. Pretzschendorf
8. Schmiedeberg
