= Sächsische Schweiz (district) =

Coordinates: 50°58′N 13°56′E

- District
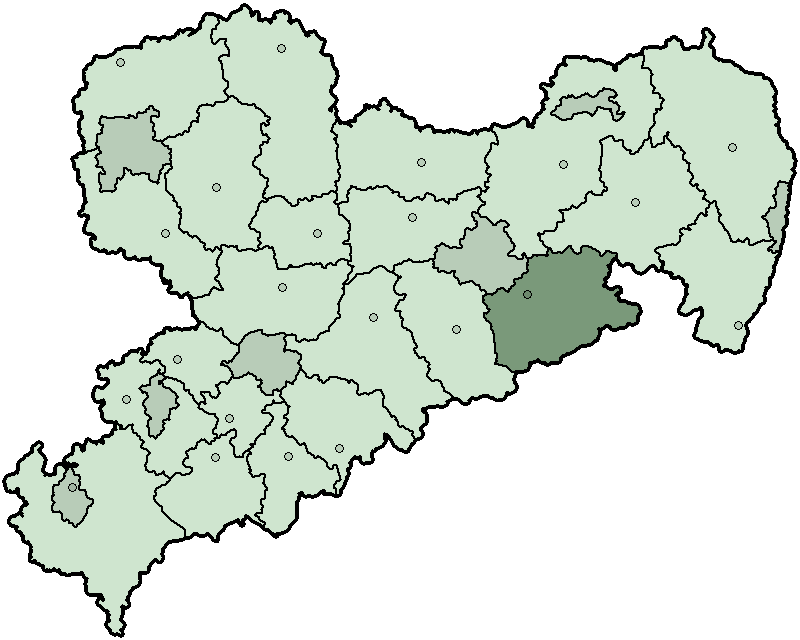
- Country: Germany
- State: Saxony
- Adm. region: Dresden
- Disbanded: 2008-08-01
- Capital: Pirna

Area
  - Total: 887.88 km^{2} (342.81 sq mi)

Population (2001)
  - Total: 147,180
  - Density: 170/km^{2} (430/sq mi)
- Time zone: UTC+01:00 (CET)
  - Summer (DST): UTC+02:00 (CEST)
- Vehicle registration: PIR
- Website: www.lra-saechsische-schweiz.de

The Sächsische Schweiz (English: Saxon Switzerland) is a former district (Kreis) in the south of Saxony, Germany. Neighboring districts were (from west clockwise) Weißeritzkreis, the district-free city Dresden and the districts Kamenz and Bautzen. To the south it borders the Czech Republic.

== History ==
The district was created in 1994 when the two districts Sebnitz and Pirna were merged. In August 2008, as a part of the district reform in Saxony, the districts of Sächsische Schweiz and Weißeritzkreis were merged into the new district Sächsische Schweiz-Osterzgebirge.

== Geography ==
The district is named after the landscape – the Saxon Switzerland – as it is the most mountainous region of Saxony. To the west are the Ore Mountains, and to the east the Lusatian Highlands. The river Elbe flows through the Elbe Sandstone Mountains and separates the two mountain ranges. The highest elevation of the district is the 644 m (2,113 ft) high Oelsener Höhe in the southwest of the district, the lowest elevation is the valley of the Elbe at the boundary to Dresden which is 109 m (358 ft) above sea level.

== Coat of arms ==
The coat of arms symbolizes the geographical location of the district. The two green areas stand for the forests in the two mountain areas, the white wavy line in the middle symbolizes the river Elbe. The coat of arms was created by Horst Torke, Pirna.

== Towns and municipalities ==
Towns
1. Bad Gottleuba-Berggießhübel
2. Bad Schandau
3. Dohna
4. Heidenau
5. Hohnstein
6. Königstein
7. Liebstadt
8. Neustadt in Sachsen
9. Pirna
10. Sebnitz
11. Stadt Wehlen
12. Stolpen
Municipalities
1. Bahretal
2. Dohma
3. Dürrröhrsdorf-Dittersbach
4. Gohrisch
5. Kirnitzschtal
6. Lohmen
7. Müglitztal
8. Porschdorf
9. Rathen
10. Rathmannsdorf
11. Reinhardtsdorf-Schöna
12. Rosenthal-Bielatal
13. Struppen

== See also ==
- Saxon Switzerland
