= Sächsische Schweiz-Osterzgebirge 3 =

State electoral district of Germany

50: Sächsische Schweiz-Osterzgebirge 3
- Electoral district for the Landtag of Saxony
- Sächsische Schweiz-Osterzgebirge 3 in 2024
- District: Sächsische Schweiz-Osterzgebirge
- Electorate: 59,886 (2024)
- Major settlements: Bad Gottleuba-Berggießhübel, Dohna, Heidenau, Liebstadt, and Pirna

Current electoral district
- Party: AfD
- Member: Jan-Oliver Zwerg

Sächsische Schweiz-Osterzgebirge 3 is an electoral constituency (German: Wahlkreis) represented in the Landtag of Saxony. It elects one member via first-past-the-post voting. Under the constituency numbering system, it is designated as constituency 50. It is within the district of Sächsische Schweiz-Osterzgebirge.

== Geography ==
The constituency comprises the towns of Bad Gottleuba-Berggießhübel, Dohna, Heidenau, Liebstadt, and Pirna, and the municipalities of Bahretal, Dohma, and Müglitztal within the district of Sächsische Schweiz-Osterzgebirge.

There were 59,886 eligible voters in 2024.

== Members ==
Election	Member	Party	%
2014	Oliver Wehner	CDU	37.3
2019	Jan-Oliver Zwerg	AfD	35.0
2024	Jan-Oliver Zwerg	AfD	41.1

== Election results ==
=== 2024 election ===
State election (2024): Sächsische Schweiz-Osterzgebirge 3
Notes:	Blue background denotes the winner of the electorate vote. Pink background denotes a candidate elected from their party list. Yellow background denotes an electorate win by a list member, or other incumbent. A ✓ or ✗ denotes status of any incumbent, win or lose respectively.						
Party	Candidate	Votes	%	±%	Party votes	%	±%
AfD	✓ Jan-Oliver Zwerg	17,701	41.1	▲6.1	15,857	36.7	▲3.0
CDU	Sandra Gockel	13,796	32.0	▲4.3	13,821	32.0	▲3.0
BSW	Frank Siebert	4,232	9.8		4,821	11.2	
SPD	Ralf Wätzig	2,319	5.4	▼1.3	2,203	5.1	▼1.3
FW	Rocco Geißdorf	1,993	4.6	▼1.4	1,014	2.3	▼2.2
Left	Lisa Thea Steiner	1,440	3.3	▼7.3	1,093	2.5	▼6.3
Greens	Rolf-Dieter Wiebusch	757	1.8	▼4.4	1,241	2.9	▼2.9
Freie Sachsen	Max Schreiber	480	1.1		1,621	3.8	
APT					428	1.0	
FDP	Max Schreiber	371	0.9	▼4.2	280	0.6	▼4.3
PARTEI					219	0.5	▼0.4
BD					151	0.3	
Pirates					105	0.2	
dieBasis					91	0.2	
Values					89	0.2	
V-Partei3					54	0.1	
ÖDP					34	0.1	
BüSo					27	0.1	
Bündnis C					19	0.0	
Informal votes		465			386		
Total valid votes		43,089			43,168		
Turnout		43,554	72.7	▲7.9			
AfD hold	Majority	3,905	9.1				

=== 2019 election ===
State election (2019): Sächsische Schweiz-Osterzgebirge 3
Notes:	Blue background denotes the winner of the electorate vote. Pink background denotes a candidate elected from their party list. Yellow background denotes an electorate win by a list member, or other incumbent. A ✓ or ✗ denotes status of any incumbent, win or lose respectively.						
Party	Candidate	Votes	%	±%	Party votes	%	±%
AfD	Jan-Oliver Zwerg	13,900	35.0	▲21.9	13,456	33.7	▲22.7
CDU	✗ Oliver Wehner	11,026	27.7	▼9.6	11,560	29.0	▼10.0
Left	Lutz Richter	4,226	10.6	▼8.2	3,539	8.9	▼9.5
SPD	Ralf Wätzig	2,641	6.6	▼5.3	2,564	6.4	▼3.5
Greens	Martin Kusic	2,441	6.1	▲1.4	2,318	5.8	▲1.5
FW	Dirk Rohrbeck	2,412	6.1		1,823	4.6	▲3.1
FDP	Norbert Bläsner	2,009	5.1	▲0.7	1,978	5.0	▲1.1
APT					614	1.5	▲0.3
NPD					499	1.3	▼7.4
The Blue Party	Frauke Petry	805	2.0		391	1.0	
PARTEI					373	0.9	▲0.4
Verjüngungsforschung					209	0.5	
Awakening of German Patriots - Central Germany					124	0.3	
Pirates					123	0.3	▼0.4
ÖDP					84	0.2	
Humanists					77	0.2	
BüSo	Doris Kamke	274	0.7	▼0.3	62	0.2	▼0.3
PDV					48	0.1	
DKP					32	0.1	
Informal votes		615			475		
Total valid votes		39,734			39,874		
Turnout		40,349	66.4	▲15.4			
AfD gain from CDU	Majority	2,874	7.3				

=== 2014 election ===
State election (2014): Sächsische Schweiz-Osterzgebirge 3
Notes:	Blue background denotes the winner of the electorate vote. Pink background denotes a candidate elected from their party list. Yellow background denotes an electorate win by a list member, or other incumbent. A ✓ or ✗ denotes status of any incumbent, win or lose respectively.						
Party	Candidate	Votes	%	±%	Party votes	%	±%
CDU	Oliver Wehner	11,512	37.3		12,096	39.0	
Left		5,820	18.8		5,710	18.4	
AfD		4,048	13.1		3,417	11.0	
SPD		3,670	11.9		3,065	9.9	
NPD		2,388	7.7		2,688	8.7	
Greens		1,465	4.7		1,336	4.3	
FDP		1,356	4.4		1,212	3.9	
FW					473	1.5	
APT					361	1.2	
Pirates		325	1.1		228	0.7	
PARTEI					169	0.5	
BüSo		312	1.0		153	0.5	
Pro Germany Citizens' Movement					59	0.2	
DSU					36	0.1	
Informal votes		521			414		
Total valid votes		30,896			31,003		
Turnout		31,417	51.0	▼3.4			
CDU win new seat	Majority	5,692	18.5				

== See also ==
- Politics of Saxony
- Landtag of Saxony
