= Sächsische Schweiz-Osterzgebirge 2 =

State electoral district of Germany

49: Sächsische Schweiz-Osterzgebirge 2
- Electoral district for the Landtag of Saxony
- Sächsische Schweiz-Osterzgebirge 2 in 2024
- District: Sächsische Schweiz-Osterzgebirge
- Electorate: 45,871 (2024)
- Major settlements: Altenberg, Dippoldiswalde, Glashütte, and Rabenau

Current electoral district
- Party: AfD
- Member: André Barth

Sächsische Schweiz-Osterzgebirge 2 is an electoral constituency (German: Wahlkreis) represented in the Landtag of Saxony. It elects one member via first-past-the-post voting. Under the constituency numbering system, it is designated as constituency 49. It is within the district of Sächsische Schweiz-Osterzgebirge.

== Geography ==
The constituency comprises the towns of Altenberg, Dippoldiswalde, Glashütte, and Rabenau, and the municipalities of Bannewitz, Hartmannsdorf-Reichenau, Hermsdorf, Klingenberg, and Kreischa within the district of Sächsische Schweiz-Osterzgebirge.

There were 45,871 eligible voters in 2024.

== Members ==
Election	Member	Party	%
2014	Andrea Dombois	CDU	46.8
2019	Andrea Dombois	CDU	34.0
2024	André Barth	AfD	40.1

== Election results ==
=== 2024 election ===
State election (2024): Sächsische Schweiz-Osterzgebirge 2
Notes:	Blue background denotes the winner of the electorate vote. Pink background denotes a candidate elected from their party list. Yellow background denotes an electorate win by a list member, or other incumbent. A ✓ or ✗ denotes status of any incumbent, win or lose respectively.						
Party	Candidate	Votes	%	±%	Party votes	%	±%
AfD	André Barth	14,340	40.1	▲6.3	13,039	36.3	▲3.3
CDU	Lars Werthmann	13,562	37.9	▲3.9	12,259	34.2	▲1.1
BSW	Jirka Hübel	3,310	9.2		4,204	11.7	
FW	Dirk Massi	1,564	4.4	▼7.4	883	2.5	▼3.3
SPD	Stefan Sgorzaly	903	2.5	▼1.8	1,526	4.3	▼1.2
Left	Tom Wittig	876	2.4	▼4.6	718	2.0	▼5.1
Greens	Sabine Pelz	696	1.9	▼3.2	885	2.5	▼3.0
Freie Sachsen	U. Karla Böhlke	281	0.8		1,150	3.2	
APT					295	0.8	
FDP	Hildegard Betscher	273	0.8	▼3.1	249	0.7	▼4.3
PARTEI					161	0.4	
BD					122	0.3	
Values					103	0.3	
Pirates					75	0.2	
dieBasis					63	0.2	
Bündnis C					59	0.2	
ÖDP					33	0.1	
V-Partei3					33	0.1	
BüSo					28	0.1	
Informal votes		361			281		
Total valid votes		35,805			35,885		
Turnout		36,166	78.8	▲5.6			
AfD gain from CDU	Majority	778	2.2				

=== 2019 election ===
State election (2019): Sächsische Schweiz-Osterzgebirge 2
Notes:	Blue background denotes the winner of the electorate vote. Pink background denotes a candidate elected from their party list. Yellow background denotes an electorate win by a list member, or other incumbent. A ✓ or ✗ denotes status of any incumbent, win or lose respectively.						
Party	Candidate	Votes	%	±%	Party votes	%	±%
CDU	✓ Andrea Dombois	11,503	34.0	▼12.8	11,214	33.1	▼10.8
AfD	André Barth	11,406	33.7	▲21.1	11,192	33.0	▲21.5
FW	Thomas Kirsten	3,990	11.8		1,954	5.8	▲2.4
Left	Steffen Wolf	2,385	7.0	▼9.1	2,407	7.1	▼7.4
Greens	Holger Weiner	1,756	5.2	▲0.8	1,842	5.4	▲1.6
SPD	Dagmar Neukirch	1,477	4.4	▼4.7	1,849	5.5	▼4.1
FDP	Peter Weinholtz	1,317	3.9	▲0.1	1,677	4.9	▲0.7
APT					441	1.3	▲0.2
PARTEI					324	1.0	▲0.6
The Blue Party					222	0.7	
NPD					209	0.6	▼5.9
Verjüngungsforschung					205	0.6	
Awakening of German Patriots - Central Germany					82	0.2	
ÖDP					81	0.2	
Pirates					70	0.2	▼0.5
Humanists					41	0.1	
PDV					41	0.1	
BüSo					27	0.1	▼0.1
DKP					17	0.1	
Informal votes		410			349		
Total valid votes		33,834			33,895		
Turnout		34,244	72.8	▲15.5			
CDU hold	Majority	97	0.3	▼30.4			

=== 2014 election ===
State election (2014): Sächsische Schweiz-Osterzgebirge 2
Notes:	Blue background denotes the winner of the electorate vote. Pink background denotes a candidate elected from their party list. Yellow background denotes an electorate win by a list member, or other incumbent. A ✓ or ✗ denotes status of any incumbent, win or lose respectively.						
Party	Candidate	Votes	%	±%	Party votes	%	±%
CDU	Andrea Dombois	12,690	46.8		11,952	43.9	
Left		4,368	16.1		3,937	14.5	
AfD		3,418	12.6		3,125	11.5	
SPD		2,467	9.1		2,618	9.6	
NPD		1,666	6.1		1,764	6.5	
Greens		1,192	4.4		1,047	3.8	
FDP		1,020	3.8		1,131	4.2	
FW					937	3.4	
APT					302	1.1	
Pirates		310	1.1		196	0.7	
PARTEI					103	0.4	
Pro Germany Citizens' Movement					62	0.2	
BüSo					42	0.2	
DSU					26	0.1	
Informal votes		490			379		
Total valid votes		27,131			27,242		
Turnout		27,621	57.3	▼1.4			
CDU win new seat	Majority	8,322	30.7				

== See also ==
- Politics of Saxony
- Landtag of Saxony
