= Großer Bärenstein =

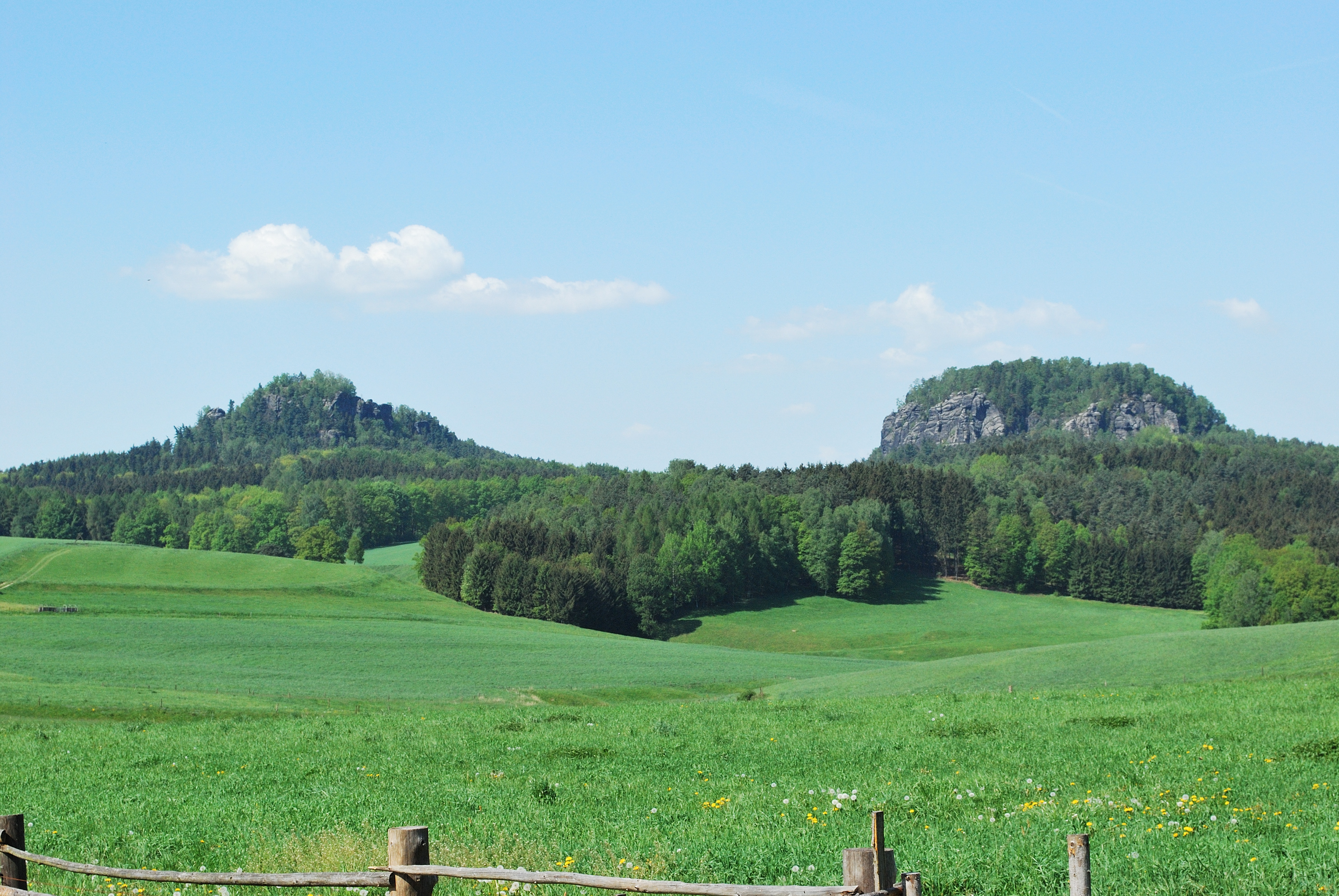
- The Bärensteine seen from Weißig

Highest point
- Elevation: 327 m above sea level (HN) (1,072.8 ft)
- Coordinates: 50°56′47″N 14°02′43″E

Geography
- Location within Saxony
- Location: Saxony, Germany
- Parent range: Saxon Switzerland

Geology
- Mountain type: Table mountain
- Rock type: Sandstone

The Großer Bärenstein (English: Great Bear Rock) is a 327 metres (1,073 feet) high table hill in the German region of Saxon Switzerland in the Free State of Saxony. Close by is the Kleiner Bärenstein which, together with the Großer Bärenstein, forms the massif known as the Bärensteine.

== Location and area ==
The Großer Bärenstein is located within a loop of the River Elbe near Rathen. Immediately at its foot is the woodland of the farms of Fleck from Weißig and the villages of Thürmsdorf and Naundorf, as well as the village of Pötzscha, part of Stadt Wehlen.

There are several climbing rocks on the Großer Bärenstein. Its summit is divided into two, with a saddle in between. The northern side has a picturesque view of Stadt Wehlen and the Elbe valley looking towards Pirna, the south and east sides look towards Königstein Fortress and the hills between the Papststein and Schrammsteine.

It may be ascended from the western-located Naundorf (easy, no signposts) or from the north (Riegelhofstiege, difficult, Klettersteig).

== Appearance ==
Unlike the Kleiner Bärenstein, the rock is almost entirely wooded and views are limited.
