= Kleiner Bärenstein =

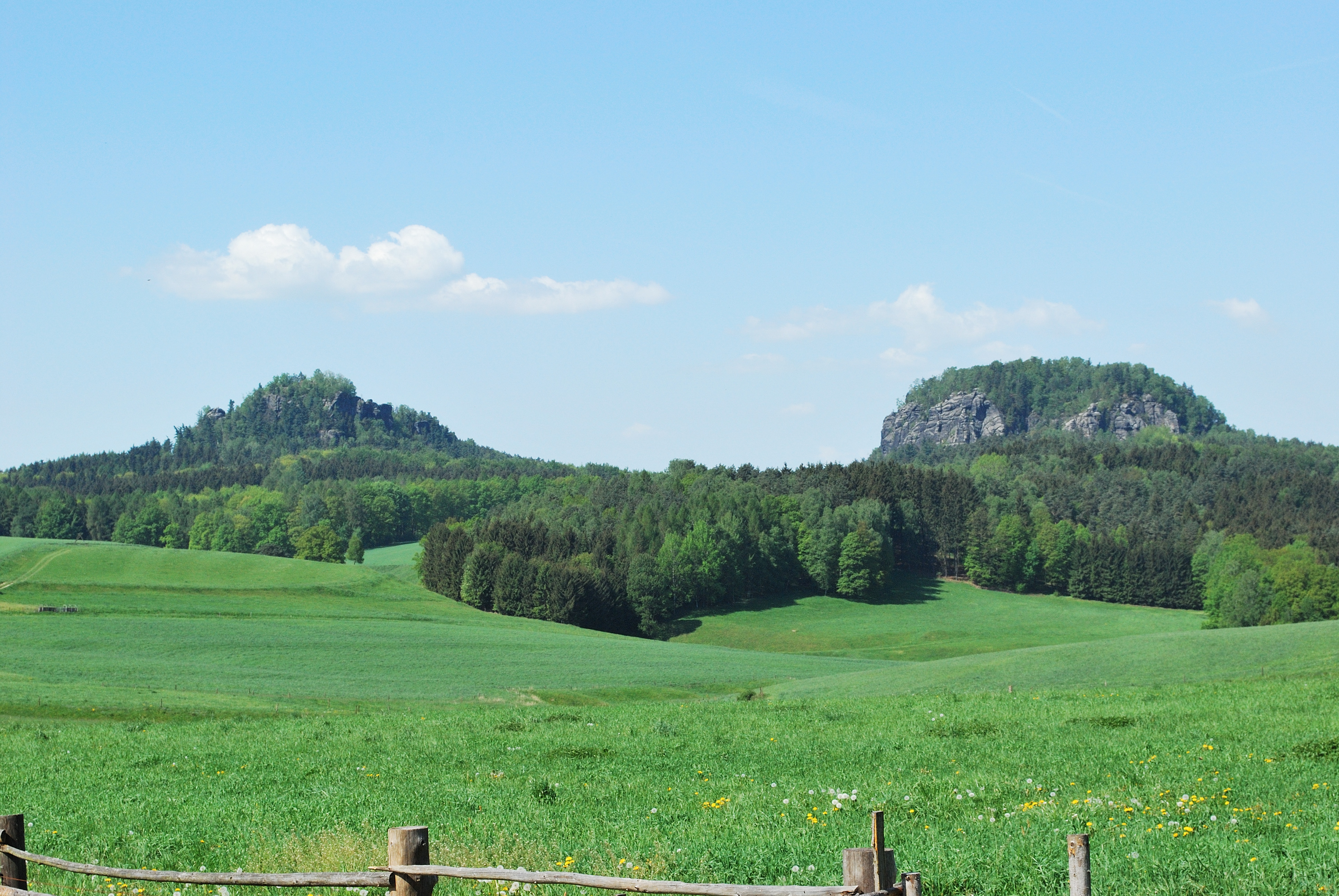
- The Bärensteine seen from Weißig

Highest point
- Elevation: 337.7 m above sea level (HN) (1,108 ft)
- Coordinates: 50°56′44″N 14°02′34″E

Geography
- Location within Saxony
- Location: Saxony, Germany
- Parent range: Saxon Switzerland

Geology
- Mountain type: table mountain
- Rock type: Sandstone

The Kleiner Bärenstein (English: Little Bear Rock) is a 338 metres (1,109 feet) high table hill in the German region of Saxon Switzerland in the Free State of Saxony. Close by is the Großer Bärenstein which, together with the Kleiner Bärenstein, forms the massif of the Bärensteine.

== Location and area ==
The Kleiner Bärenstein is located within a loop of the River Elbe at Rathen. The Bärensteine peaks form part of the parish boundary of Weißig. At the foot of the Bärenstein are the woodlands of the farms of Fleck from Weißig. Also nearby are the villages of Thürmsdorf and Naundorf. On the Kleiner Bärenstein there are several climbing rocks, the most important being the Thürmsdorfer Stein.

== History ==
The Kleiner Bärenstein was first recorded in 1548 as "im Behrenstein". Earlier descriptions also talked of the "Thürmsdorfer Bärenstein". In the 19th century the district forester (Revierförster), Wilhelm Mahn, made the Bärenstein accessible to hikers.

From 1851 until 1943 there was a small day-trippers pub on the Kleiner Bärenstein. As a result of the Second World War it was not possible to renovate and maintain it, so the restaurant fell into decay. Its foundations are still visible today.

In 2004 the woods around the Bärensteine were bought by private individuals.

== Diebskeller ==
At the southwestern foot of the Kleiner Bärenstein there is a small collapse cave, caused by a rockfall and erosion, that is known locally as the Thieves' Cellar (Diebskeller).

Wilhelm Leberecht Götzinger, who grew up in nearby Struppen, was apparently inspired to research the nature of Saxon Switzerland when walking to the Kleiner Bärenstein as a child. Götzinger later published the first comprehensive descriptions of Saxon Switzerland. In 1886 the Saxon Switzerland Alpine Club erected a memorial tablet in the Diebskeller in honour of Götzinger.

== Views ==
There is a viewing point on the summit of the Kleiner Bärenstein with views over large parts of Saxon Switzerland.

== Gallery ==
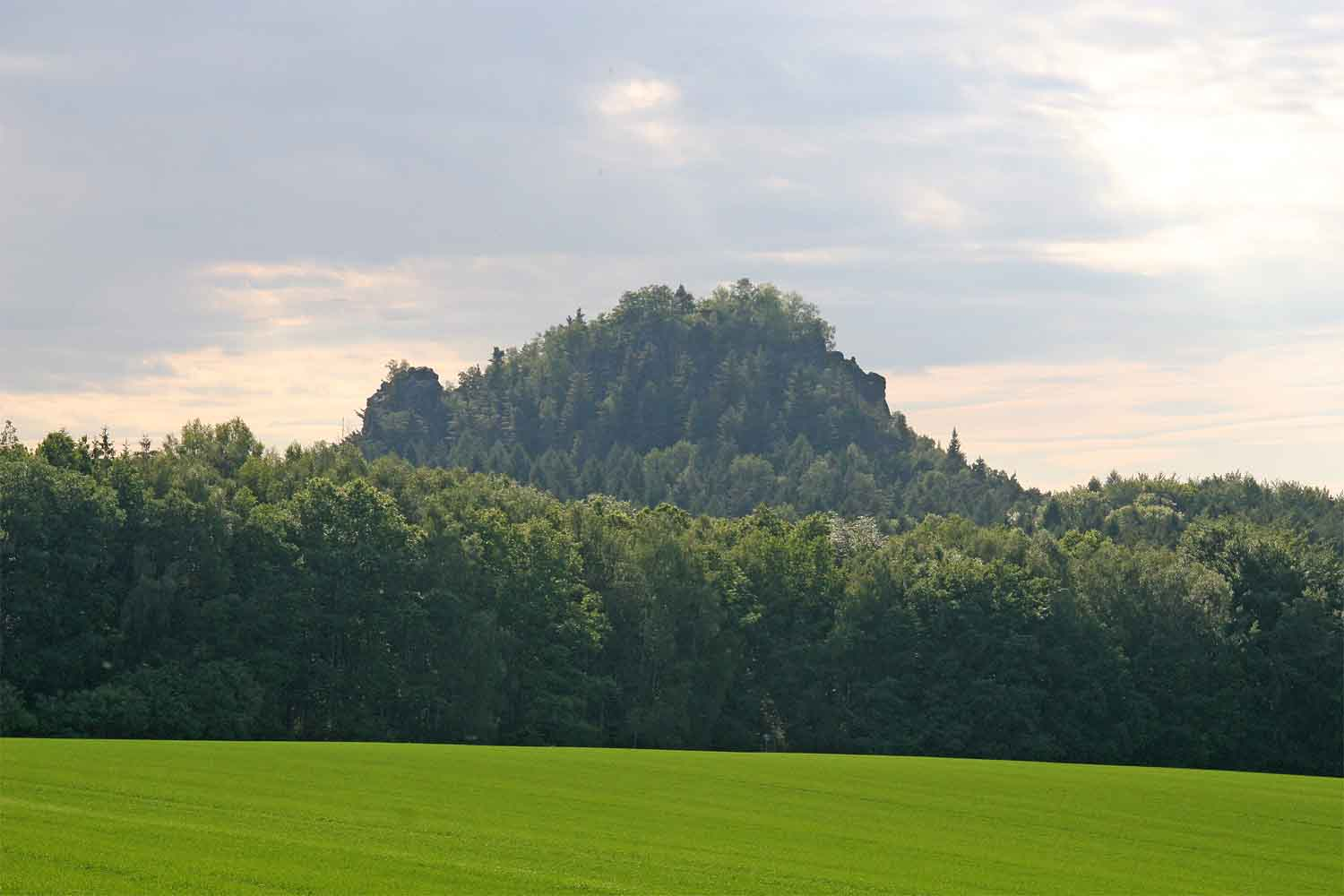
The Kleiner Bärenstein seen from Weißig

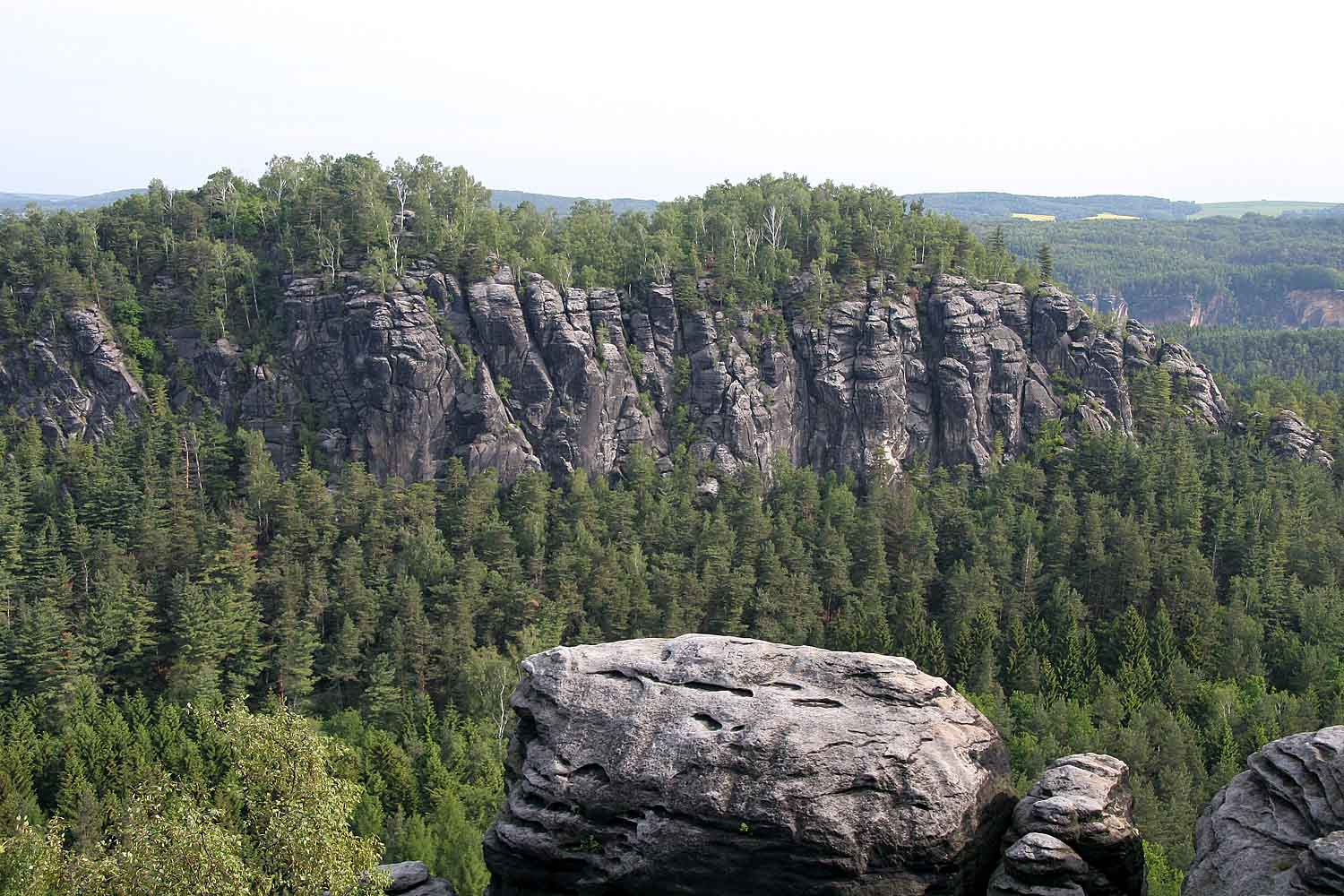
View from the Kleiner Bärenstein to the nearby Großer Bärenstein

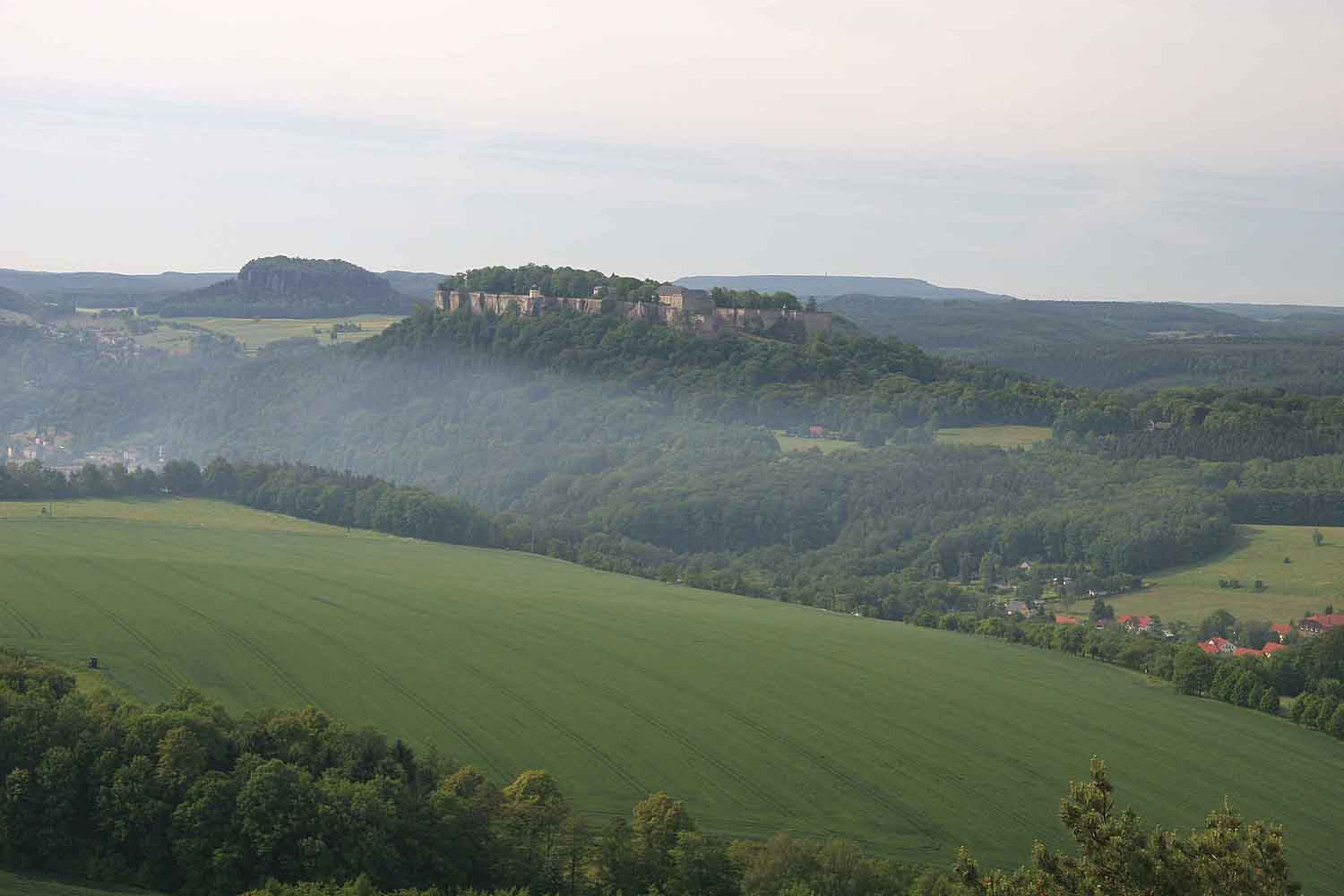
View from the Kleiner Bärenstein to Königstein Fortress and the Pfaffenstein
