= Röthenbach =

Röthenbach may refer to:

- in Germany
  - in Bavaria
    - Röthenbach an der Pegnitz, a city
    - Röthenbach (Allgäu), a municipality
    - Röthenbach bei Sankt Wolfgang, part of the municipality of Wendelstein
    - Röthenbach (Altdorf bei Nürnberg), part of the municipality of Altdorf bei Nürnberg
    - Röthenbach bei Schweinau, in the city of Nürnberg
    - Röthenbach (Arzberg Oberfranken), in the municipality of Arzberg (Oberfranken), Wunsiedel im Fichtelgebirge
    - Röthenbach (Griesstätt), in the municipality of Griesstätt, Rosenheim
    - Röthenbach (Reuth bei Erbendorf), in the municipality of Reuth bei Erbendorf, Tirschenreuth
    - Röthenbach (Kohlberg), in the municipality of Kohlberg (Oberpfalz), Neustadt an der Waldnaab
  - in Saxony
    - Röthenbach (Rodewisch), in the municipality of Rodewisch, Vogtlandkreis
    - Röthenbach (Pretzschendorf), in the municipality of Pretzschendorf, Weißeritzkreis
- in Switzerland
  - Röthenbach bei Herzogenbuchsee, a municipality in the canton of Berne
  - Röthenbach im Emmental, a municipality in the canton of Berne

== See also ==
- Rothenbach (disambiguation)
