= Bärensteine =

Coordinates: 50°56′48″N 14°02′40″E

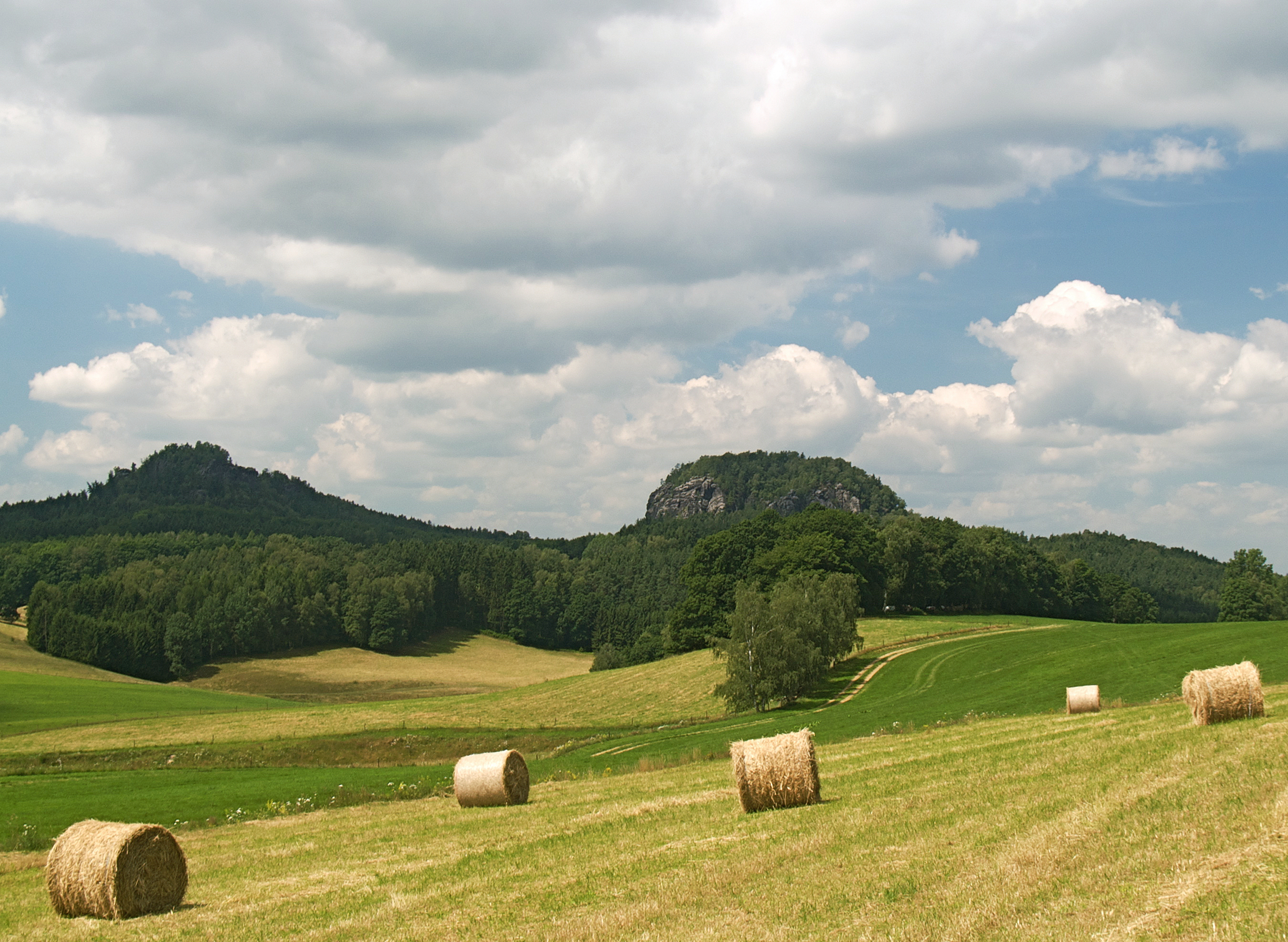
- The Bärensteine seen from Weißig

Highest point
- Elevation: 338 m (1,109 ft)

Geography
- Location: Saxony, Germany
- Parent range: Elbe Sandstone Mountains

The Bärensteine is a massif in the state of Saxony in eastern Germany near Weißig. It comprises the two rock formations known as the Großer and Kleiner Bärenstein (the "Great" and "Little Bear Rock") in Saxon Switzerland. The Kleiner Bärenstein has a height of 338 metres (1,109 feet). The more prominent Großer Bärenstein is actually the lower of the two with a height of 327 metres (1,073 feet).

On the Kleiner Bärenstein there used to be a panorama restaurant that belonged to the manor house at Thürmsdorf. It was plundered in the years following the Second World War and demolished.

== See also ==
- Kleiner Bärenstein, the Little Bear Rock
- Großer Bärenstein, the Great Bear Rock
