= Klingenberg, Saxony =

Klingenberg
- Municipality
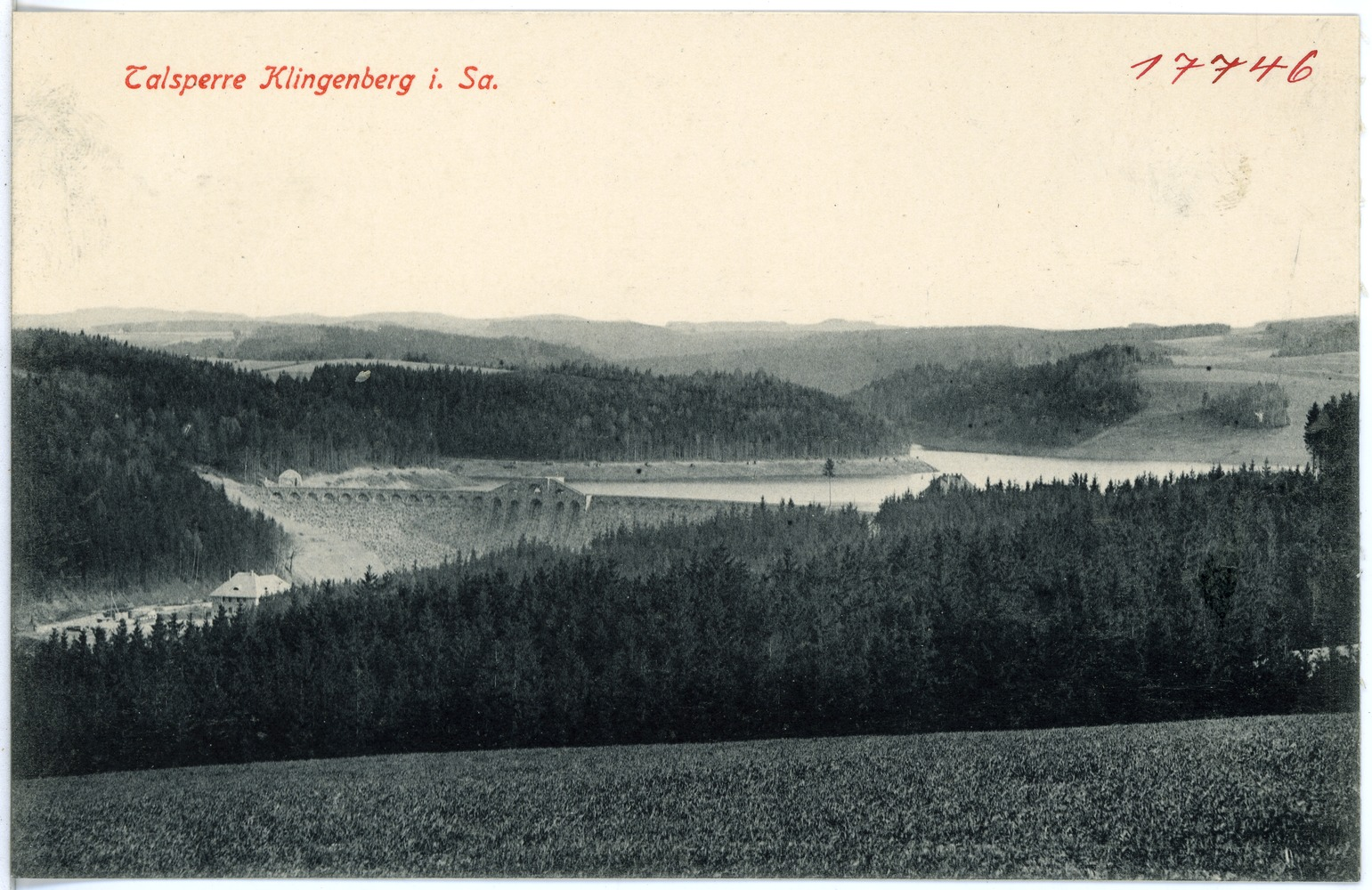

- Location of Klingenberg within Sächsische Schweiz-Osterzgebirge district
- Interactive map of Klingenberg
- Location within Germany Location within Saxony
- Coordinates: 50°54′N 13°33′E
- Country: Germany
- State: Saxony
- District: Sächsische Schweiz-Osterzgebirge
- Subdivisions: 11

Area
  - Total: 86.74 km^{2} (33.49 sq mi)

Population (2025-12-31)
  - Total: 6,569
  - Density: 75.73/km^{2} (196.1/sq mi)
- Time zone: UTC+01:00 (CET)
  - Summer (DST): UTC+02:00 (CEST)
- Postal codes: 01738, 01744, 01774
- Dialling codes: 035055, 035202, 035058, 037326
- Vehicle registration: PIR
- Website: www.gemeinde-klingenberg.de

Klingenberg (German pronunciation: [ˈklɪŋənˌbɛʁk]) is a municipality in the Sächsische Schweiz-Osterzgebirge district, in Saxony, Germany. It was formed on 31 December 2012 by the merger of the former municipalities Pretzschendorf and Höckendorf.

== Geography ==
The municipality is located 20 kilometers south-west of Dresden and 10 kilometers west of Dippoldiswalde.

Klingenberg consists of 11 subdivisions: Beerwalde, Borlas, Colmnitz (including Folge), Friedersdorf, Höckendorf (including Edle Krone), Klingenberg, Obercunnersdorf, Paulshain, Pretzschendorf, Röthenbach and Ruppendorf.

== Transport ==
Klingenberg is located along Dresden–Werdau railway, having two stations within its limits: Klingenberg-Colmnitz (located in the boroughs of Klingenberg and Colmnitz) and Edle Krone (located in the village of Höckendorf). At Klingenberg-Colmnitz station two narrow-gauge railway lines used to branch off until the early 1970s, connecting also the villages of Colmnitz and Pretzschendorf to the rail network.
