= Gohrisch (hill) =

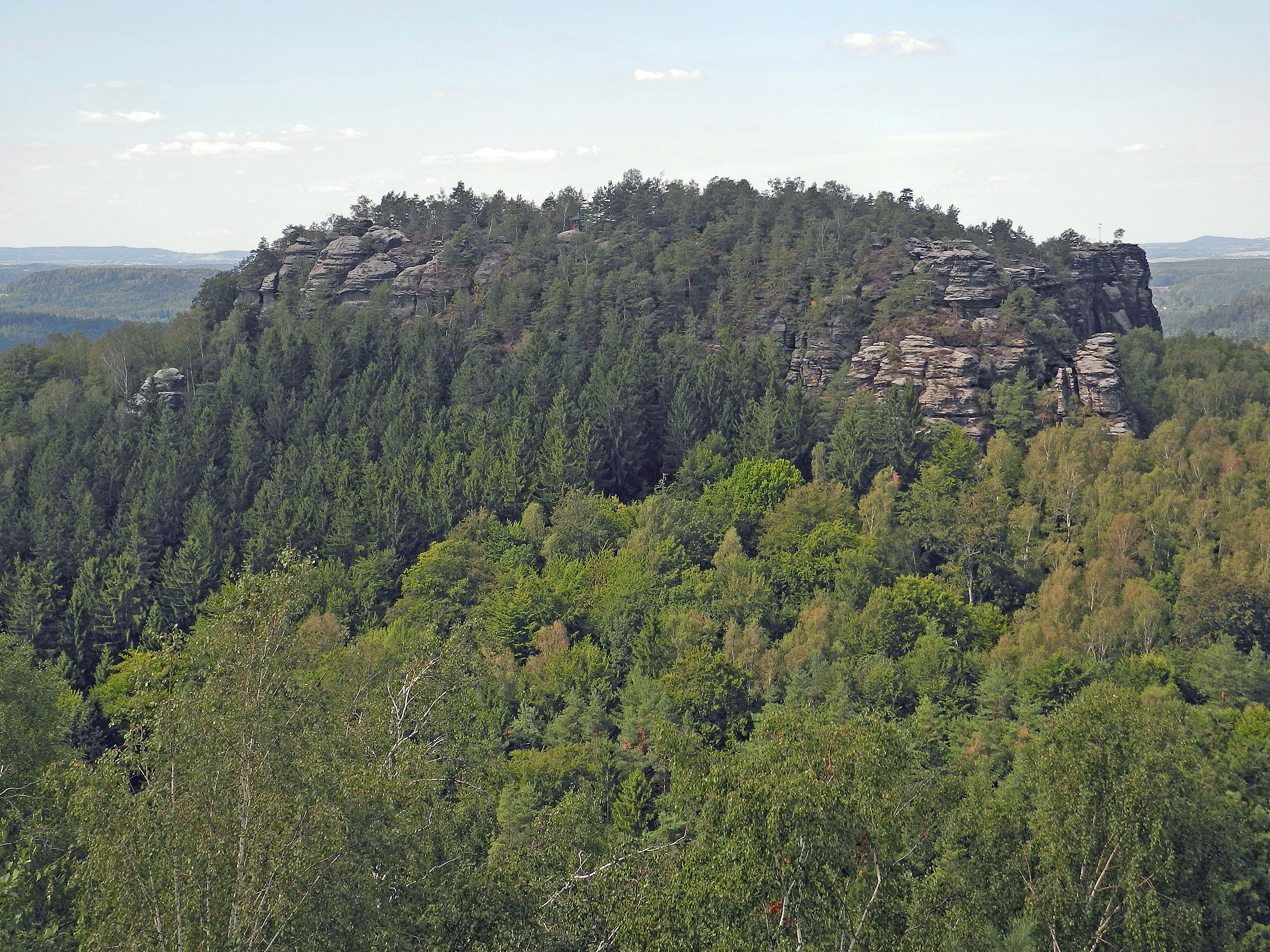
- The Gohrisch seen from the Papststein

Highest point
- Elevation: 439.8 m above sea level (HN) (1,443 ft)
- Coordinates: 50°54′04″N 14°06′44″E

Geography
- Location within Saxony
- Location: Saxony (Germany)
- Parent range: Elbe Sandstone Mountains

Geology
- Rock age: Coniacian
- Mountain type: Table mountain
- Rock type: Sandstone stage e

The Gohrisch (also called the Gohrischstein, 440 m) is a table hill in the German region of Saxon Switzerland, left of the River Elbe in Saxony.

== Location and surrounding area ==
The Gohrisch is located about four kilometres southeast of Königstein and some four kilometres south of Bad Schandau in the centre of a plateau (Ebenheit) that is dominated by similar rocky hills. It is surrounded by the hills of the Papststein, the Kleinhennersdorfer Stein and the Lasensteine. Touristically this micro-region in Saxon Switzerland is often called the "Region of Rocks" (Gebiet der Steine).

At the foot of the Gohrisch lie the small villages of Kurort Gohrisch and Papstdorf, which belong to the municipality of Gohrisch. On the east side is the Speckstein Gallery (Specksteinstollen) which bears witness to former prospecting in this area. In the immediate vicinity there is a small, overgrown quarry where basalt used to be extracted for used as road ballast.

== Sources ==
- Bernd Ullrich, Dieter Kutschke: Historische und Mineralogische Aspekte des Bergbauversuchs am Gohrisch ("Specksteinstollen") im Elbsandsteingebirge (Sachsen), in: Geologica Saxonica 52/53(2007), S. 69-90 (Digitalisat)
- Gebiet Königstein, Sächsische Schweiz. Edition no. 1 Akademie-Verlag Berlin, Berlin 1957 (Werte der deutschen Heimat. Vol. 1).
