= Liethen Mill =

Coordinates: 50.902522°N 14.149559°E

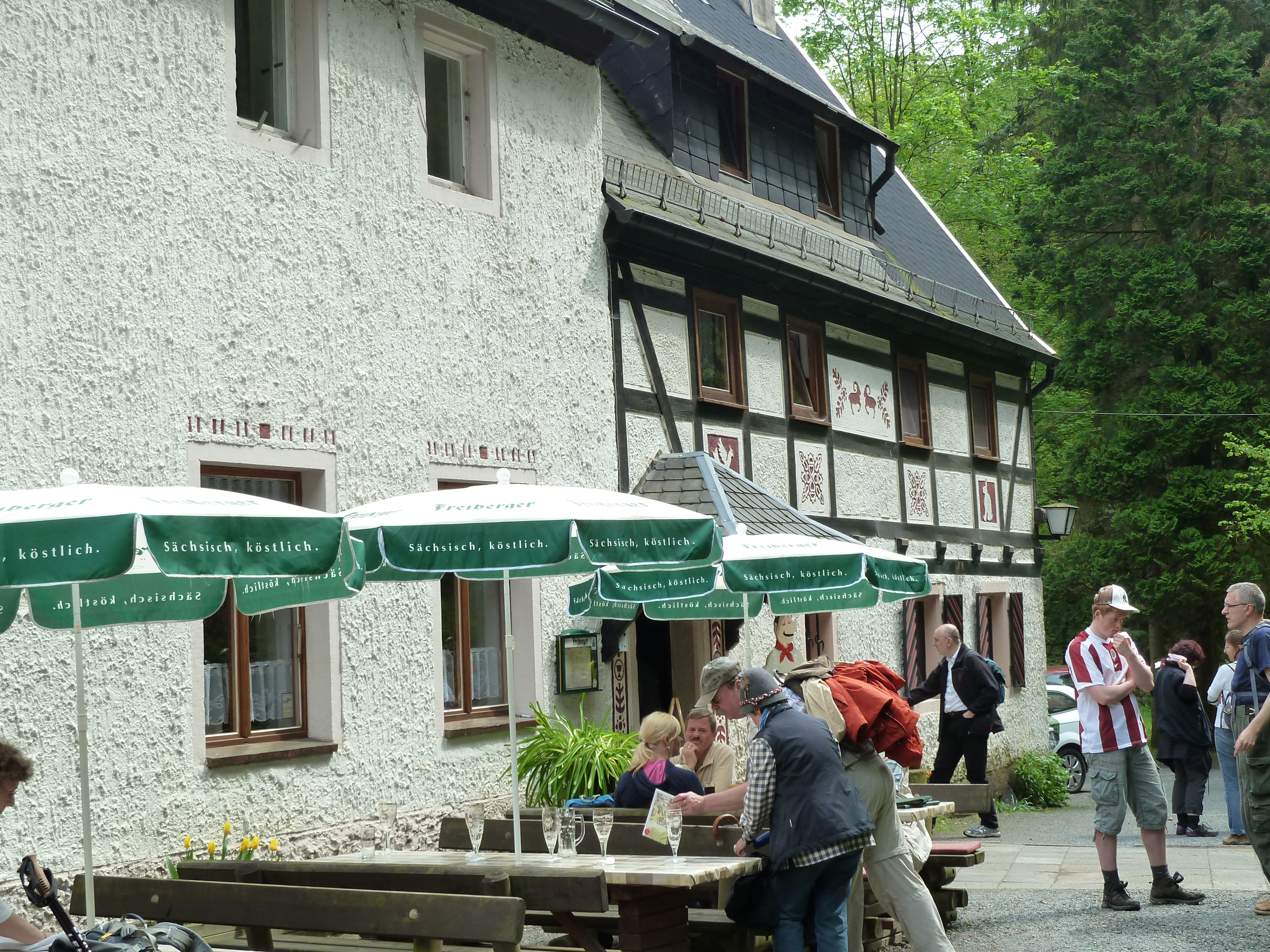

The Liethen Mill (German: Liethenmühle) is a former watermill in the village of Kleinhennersdorf in the municipality of Gohrisch in Saxon Switzerland in East Germany. It is used today as a forest inn and bed and breakfast.

== Geographical location ==
The mill lies in a hollow between Krippen and Kleinhennersdorf in the Elbe Sandstone Mountains.

== History ==
The Liethen Mill was first mentioned in 1572 in the records. It was worked for over three centuries until 1900 and was then converted into an inn with overnight accommodation that was opened in 1901. In East German times the mill was used as a holiday home by the clock factory in Ruhla, before being reopened to the public again in 1989 as a restaurant and guesthouse.
