= Schmiedeberg, Saxony =

Schmiedeberg
- Ortsteil of Dippoldiswalde
- Interactive map of Schmiedeberg
- Location within Germany Location within Saxony
- Coordinates: 50°50′15″N 13°40′31″E
- Country: Germany
- State: Saxony
- District: Sächsische Schweiz-Osterzgebirge
- Town: Dippoldiswalde

Area
  - Total: 40.76 km^{2} (15.74 sq mi)
- Elevation: 420–560 m (1,380–1,840 ft)

Population (2012-12-31)
  - Total: 4,467
  - Density: 109.6/km^{2} (283.8/sq mi)
- Time zone: UTC+01:00 (CET)
  - Summer (DST): UTC+02:00 (CEST)
- Postal codes: 01762
- Dialling codes: 035052
- Vehicle registration: PIR
- Website: www.schmiedeberg.net

Schmiedeberg is a village and a former municipality in the Sächsische Schweiz-Osterzgebirge district, in Saxony, Germany. It is situated in the valley of the river Rote Weißeritz, 24 km south of Dresden. Since 1 January 2014, it is part of the town Dippoldiswalde.
