= Rothenbach (disambiguation) =

Rothenbach is an Ortsgemeinde – a community belonging to a Verbandsgemeinde – in the Westerwaldkreis in Rhineland-Palatinate, Germany.

Rotenbach may also refer to:

- Rothenbach (Ems), a river of North Rhine-Westphalia, Germany, tributary of the Ems
- Rothenbach (Werre), a river of North Rhine-Westphalia, Germany, tributary of the Werre
- Rothenbach, a community of Kelberg, in Rhineland-Palatinate, Germany

== People with the surname ==
- Carsten Rothenbach (born 1980), German football defender

== See also ==
- Röthenbach (disambiguation)
