= Höckendorf =

- Ortsteil of Klingenberg
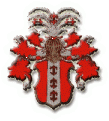
- Coat of arms
- Interactive map of Höckendorf
- Location within Germany Location within Saxony
- Coordinates: 50°55′N 13°35′E
- Country: Germany
- State: Saxony
- District: Sächsische Schweiz-Osterzgebirge
- Municipality: Klingenberg
- Subdivisions: 6

Area
  - Total: 36.65 km^{2} (14.15 sq mi)
- Elevation: 376 m (1,234 ft)

Population (2011-12-31)
  - Total: 2,950
  - Density: 80.5/km^{2} (208/sq mi)
- Time zone: UTC+01:00 (CET)
  - Summer (DST): UTC+02:00 (CEST)
- Postal codes: 01774
- Dialling codes: 035055
- Vehicle registration: PIR
- Website: www.gemeinde-hoeckendorf.de

Höckendorf (German pronunciation: [ˈhœkn̩ˌdɔʁf]) is a village and a former municipality in the Sächsische Schweiz-Osterzgebirge district, in Saxony, Germany. Since 31 December 2012, it is part of the municipality Klingenberg.
