= Kleinhennersdorfer Stein =

Mountain in Saxony, Germany

Coordinates: 50°55′N 14°08′E

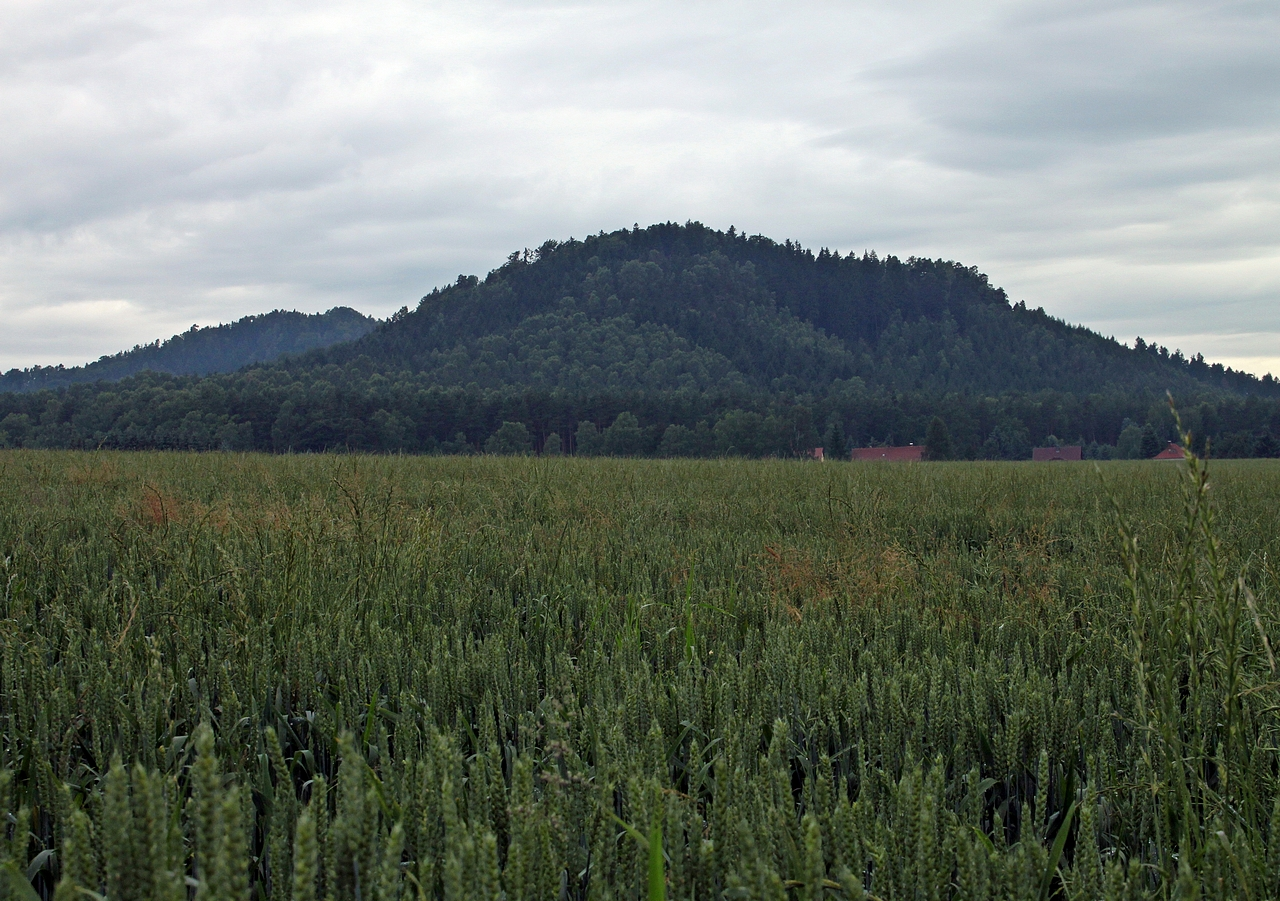
- Kleinhennersdorfer Stein Mountain in Germany

Geography
- Location: Saxony, Germany

Kleinhennersdorfer Stein is a mountain of Saxony, southeastern Germany.
