= Bannewitz =

- Municipality
- Coat of arms

- Location of Bannewitz within Sächsische Schweiz-Osterzgebirge district
- Interactive map of Bannewitz
- Location within Germany Location within Saxony
- Coordinates: 50°59′35″N 13°43′0″E
- Country: Germany
- State: Saxony
- District: Sächsische Schweiz-Osterzgebirge
- Subdivisions: 15

Government
  - Mayor (2022–29): Heiko Wersig

Area
  - Total: 25.82 km^{2} (9.97 sq mi)
- Elevation: 221 m (725 ft)

Population (2025-12-31)
  - Total: 11,013
  - Density: 426.5/km^{2} (1,105/sq mi)
- Time zone: UTC+01:00 (CET)
  - Summer (DST): UTC+02:00 (CEST)
- Postal codes: 01728
- Dialling codes: 0351, 035206
- Vehicle registration: PIR
- Website: www.bannewitz.de

Bannewitz is a municipality in the Sächsische Schweiz-Osterzgebirge district, in Saxony, Germany. It is situated 7 km (4 mi) south of Dresden (centre).
