= Dorfhain =

- Municipality
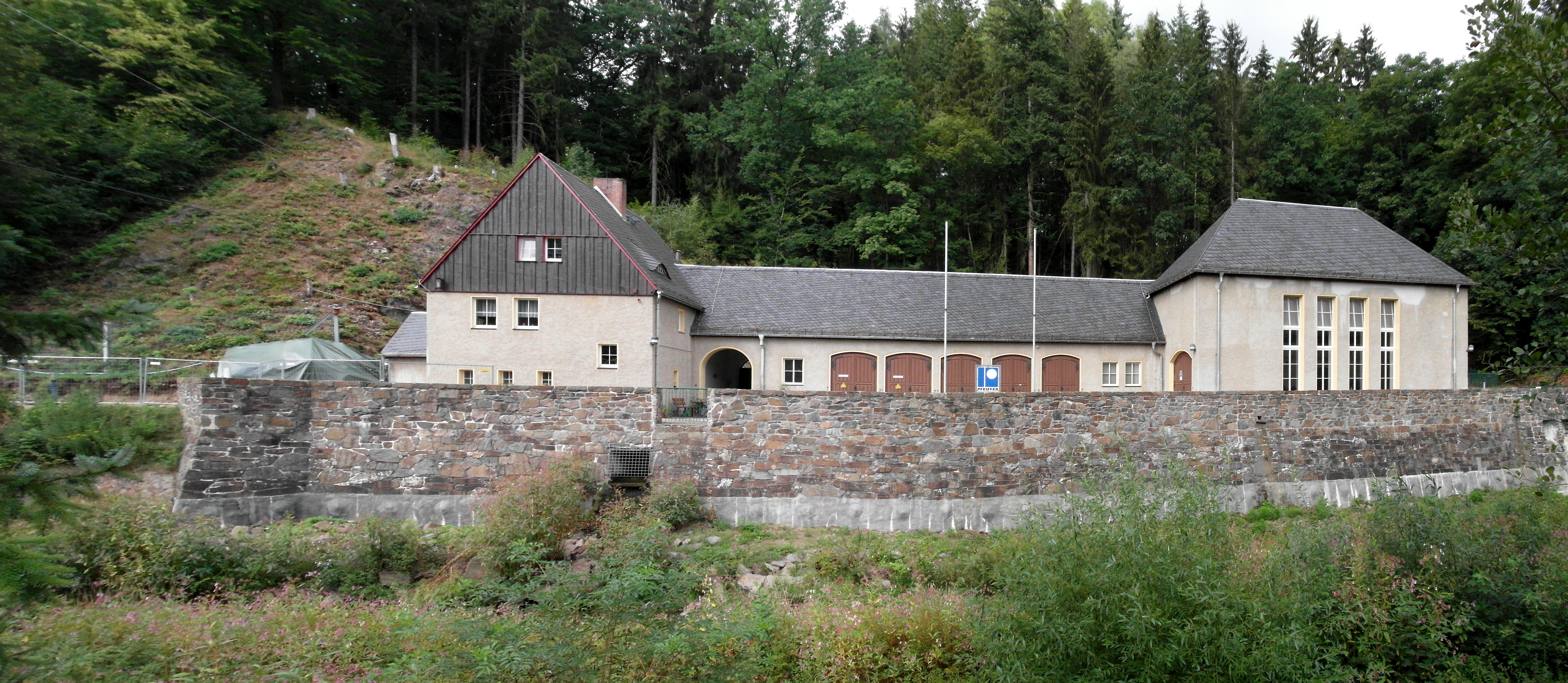
- Hydroelectric power plant

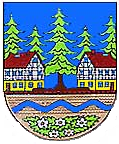
- Coat of arms

- Location of Dorfhain within Sächsische Schweiz-Osterzgebirge district
- Interactive map of Dorfhain
- Location within Germany Location within Saxony
- Coordinates: 50°56′N 13°34′E
- Country: Germany
- State: Saxony
- District: Sächsische Schweiz-Osterzgebirge
- Subdivisions: 3

Government
  - Mayor (2021–28): Olaf Schwalbe (CDU)

Area
  - Total: 6.26 km^{2} (2.42 sq mi)
- Elevation: 362 m (1,188 ft)

Population (2025-12-31)
  - Total: 1,039
  - Density: 166/km^{2} (430/sq mi)
- Time zone: UTC+01:00 (CET)
  - Summer (DST): UTC+02:00 (CEST)
- Postal codes: 01738
- Dialling codes: 035055
- Vehicle registration: PIR
- Website: www.dorfhain.de

Dorfhain is a municipality in the Sächsische Schweiz-Osterzgebirge district, in Saxony, Germany.
