= Rathmannsdorf =

Place in Saxony, Germany

- Municipality
- Coat of arms

- Location of Rathmannsdorf within Sächsische Schweiz-Osterzgebirge district
- Interactive map of Rathmannsdorf
- Location within Germany Location within Saxony
- Coordinates: 50°56′N 14°08′E
- Country: Germany
- State: Saxony
- District: Sächsische Schweiz-Osterzgebirge
- Subdivisions: 5

Government
  - Mayor (2022–29): Uwe Thiele (CDU)

Area
  - Total: 4.37 km^{2} (1.69 sq mi)
- Elevation: 225 m (738 ft)

Population (2025-12-31)
  - Total: 869
  - Density: 199/km^{2} (515/sq mi)
- Time zone: UTC+01:00 (CET)
  - Summer (DST): UTC+02:00 (CEST)
- Postal codes: 01814
- Dialling codes: 035022
- Vehicle registration: PIR
- Website: www.rathmannsdorf.de

Rathmannsdorf is a township in the Saxon district of Sächsische Schweiz-Osterzgebirge. Rathmannsdorf is 2 km (1 mi) down the Elbe from Bad Schandau.

== Geography ==
The township's highest point is a plateau near Bad Schandau 200 meters above sea level, with the lowest point 120 meters above sea level along the Elbe. The township consists of the districts Wendischfähre, Höhe, Zauke, Plan and Gluto.

== History ==
Rathmannsdorf was first mentioned in a document in 1443. Rathmannsdorf along with Bad Schandau, Porschdorf, and Reinhardtsdorf-Schöna form a Verwaltungsgemeinschaft. The town is also a stop on the Sebnitztalbahn part of the Sächsische Semmering-Bahn, a local railroad.
