= Rosenthal-Bielatal =

- Municipality
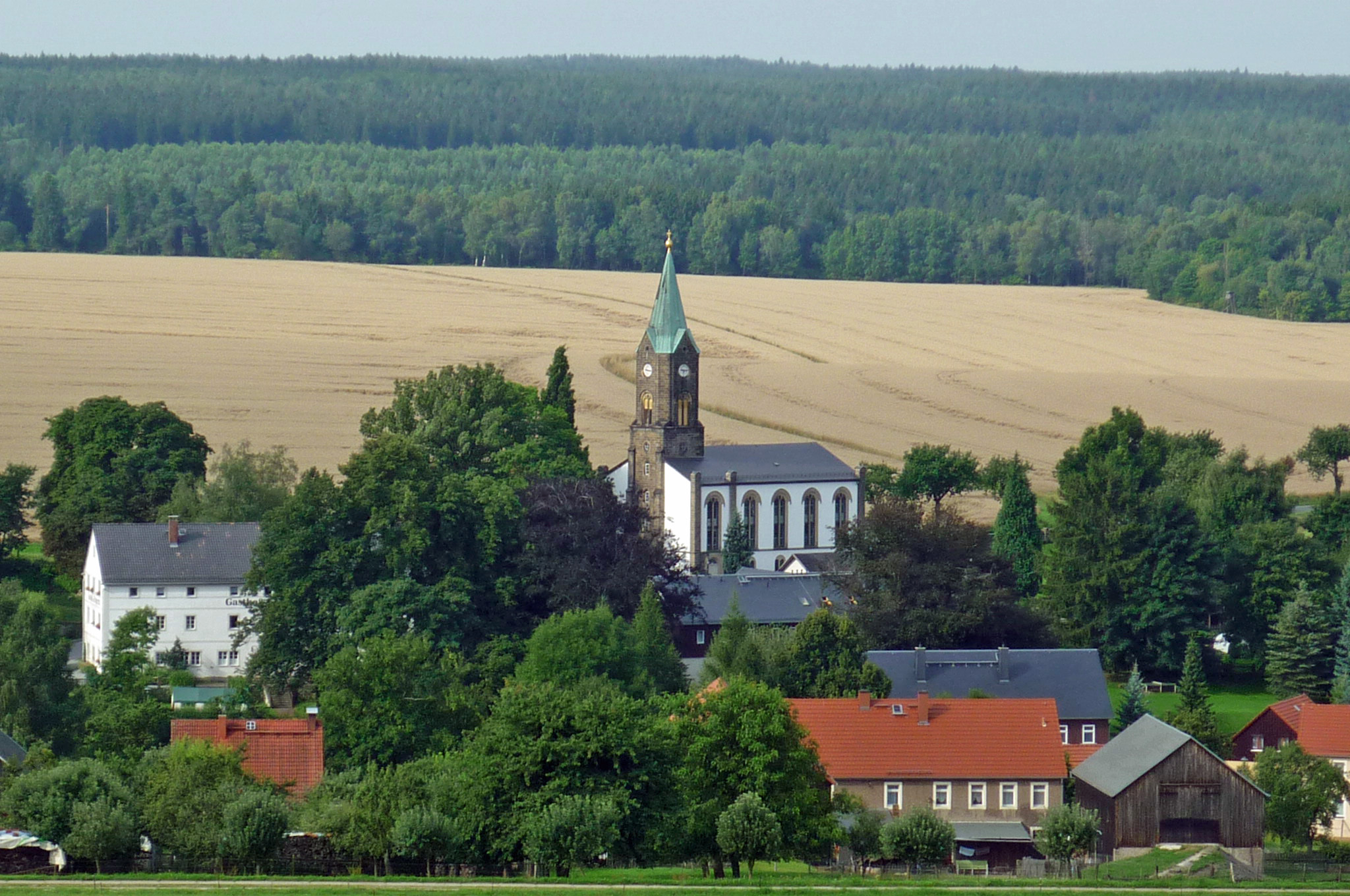
- Saint Gall Church in Rosenthal

- Location of Rosenthal-Bielatal within Sächsische Schweiz-Osterzgebirge district
- Interactive map of Rosenthal-Bielatal
- Location within Germany Location within Saxony
- Coordinates: 50°52′N 14°03′E
- Country: Germany
- State: Saxony
- District: Sächsische Schweiz-Osterzgebirge
- Subdivisions: 2

Government
  - Mayor (2022–29): Tino Bernhardt

Area
  - Total: 46.45 km^{2} (17.93 sq mi)
- Elevation: 408 m (1,339 ft)

Population (2025-12-31)
  - Total: 1,513
  - Density: 32.57/km^{2} (84.36/sq mi)
- Time zone: UTC+01:00 (CET)
  - Summer (DST): UTC+02:00 (CEST)
- Postal codes: 01824
- Dialling codes: 035033
- Vehicle registration: PIR
- Website: www.rosenthal-bielatal.de

Rosenthal-Bielatal is a municipality in the Sächsische Schweiz-Osterzgebirge district, in Saxony, Germany.
