= Hermsdorf, Saxony =

Hermsdorf
- Municipality
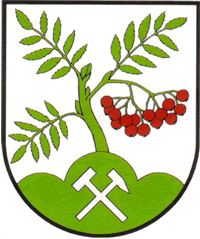
- Coat of arms

- Location of Hermsdorf within Sächsische Schweiz-Osterzgebirge district
- Interactive map of Hermsdorf
- Location within Germany Location within Saxony
- Coordinates: 50°45′40″N 13°37′47″E
- Country: Germany
- State: Saxony
- District: Sächsische Schweiz-Osterzgebirge
- Subdivisions: 3

Government
  - Mayor (2021–28): Andreas Liebscher

Area
  - Total: 20.14 km^{2} (7.78 sq mi)
- Elevation: 720 m (2,360 ft)

Population (2025-12-31)
  - Total: 717
  - Density: 35.6/km^{2} (92.2/sq mi)
- Time zone: UTC+01:00 (CET)
  - Summer (DST): UTC+02:00 (CEST)
- Postal codes: 01776
- Dialling codes: 035057
- Vehicle registration: PIR
- Website: www.hermsdorf-erzgebirge.de

Hermsdorf (German pronunciation: [ˈhɛʁmsˌdɔʁf]) is a municipality in the Sächsische Schweiz-Osterzgebirge district, in Saxony, Germany.
