= Hartmannsdorf-Reichenau =

- Municipality
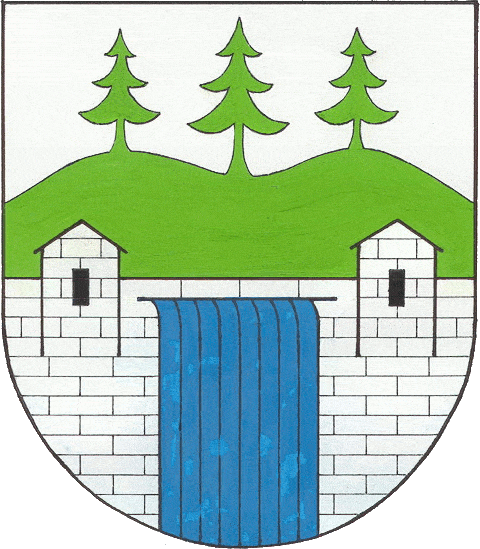
- Coat of arms

- Location of Hartmannsdorf-Reichenau within Sächsische Schweiz-Osterzgebirge district
- Interactive map of Hartmannsdorf-Reichenau
- Location within Germany Location within Saxony
- Coordinates: 50°49′0″N 13°34′30″E
- Country: Germany
- State: Saxony
- District: Sächsische Schweiz-Osterzgebirge
- Subdivisions: 2

Government
  - Mayor (2021–28): Michael Börner

Area
  - Total: 28.31 km^{2} (10.93 sq mi)
- Elevation: 569 m (1,867 ft)

Population (2025-12-31)
  - Total: 1,030
  - Density: 36.4/km^{2} (94.2/sq mi)
- Time zone: UTC+01:00 (CET)
  - Summer (DST): UTC+02:00 (CEST)
- Postal codes: 01762
- Dialling codes: 037326
- Vehicle registration: PIR

Hartmannsdorf-Reichenau is a municipality in the Sächsische Schweiz-Osterzgebirge district, in Saxony, Germany.
