= Papststein =

Mountain in Saxony

Coordinates: 50°54′12″N 14°07′16″E

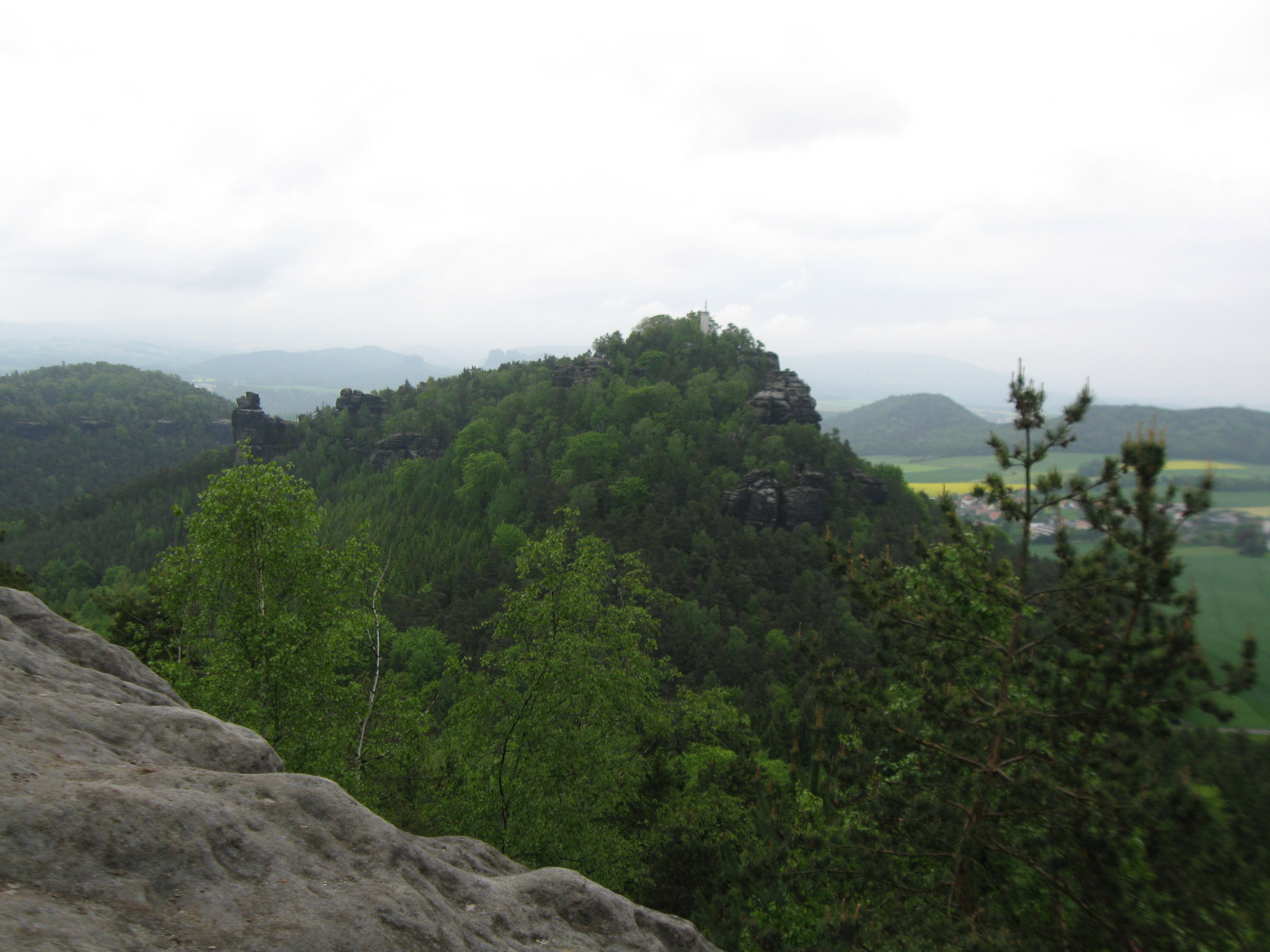
- Papststein

Geography
- Location within Saxony
- Location: Saxony, Germany

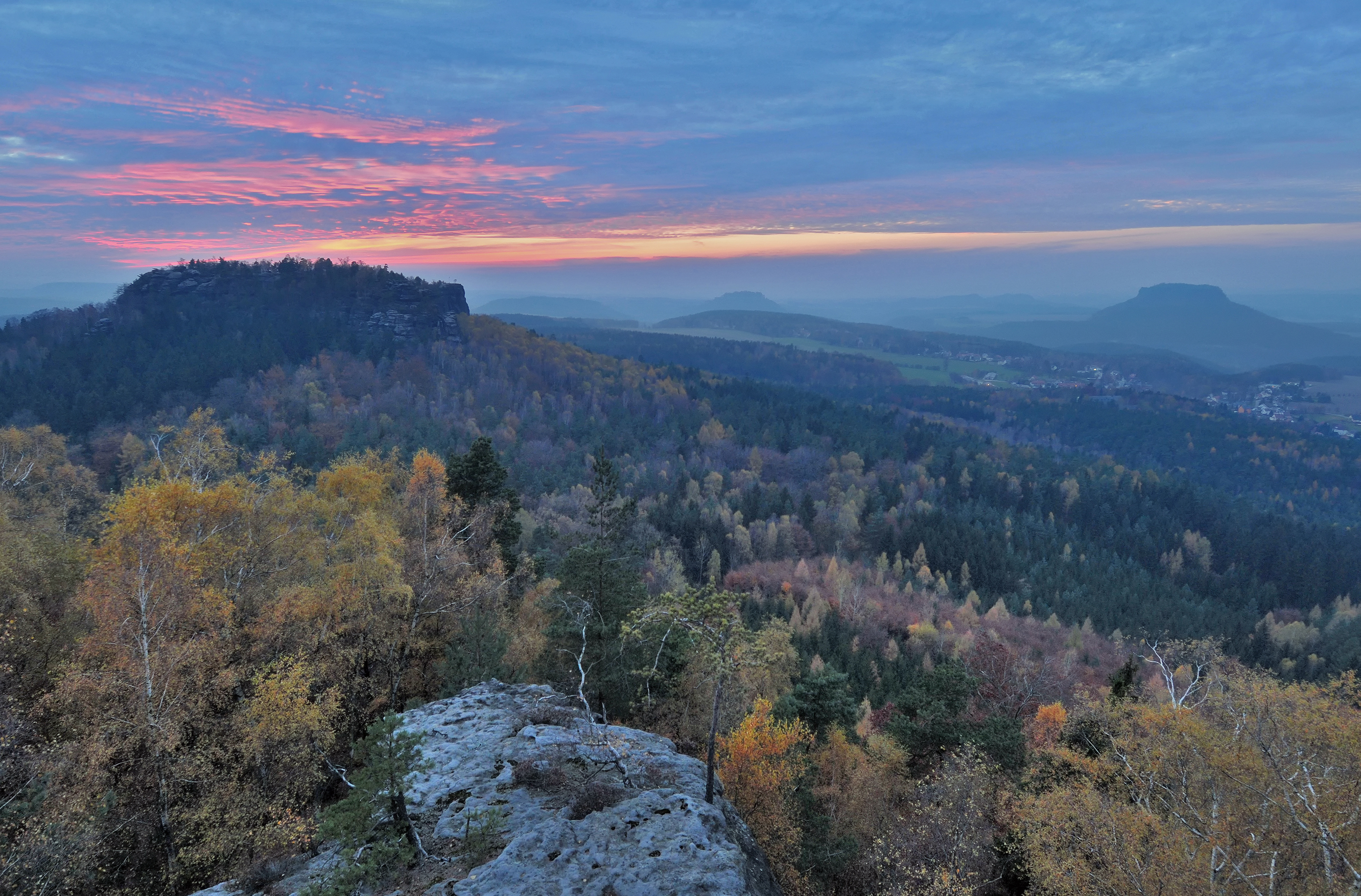
View from the viewpoint on the top of the Papststein. The three large mountains are Gohrisch (left), the Königstein Fortress (in exact centre) and the Lilienstein (right). The village has the name Kurort Gohrisch.

Papststein is a mountain of Saxony, southeastern Germany.
