= Dohma =

- Municipality
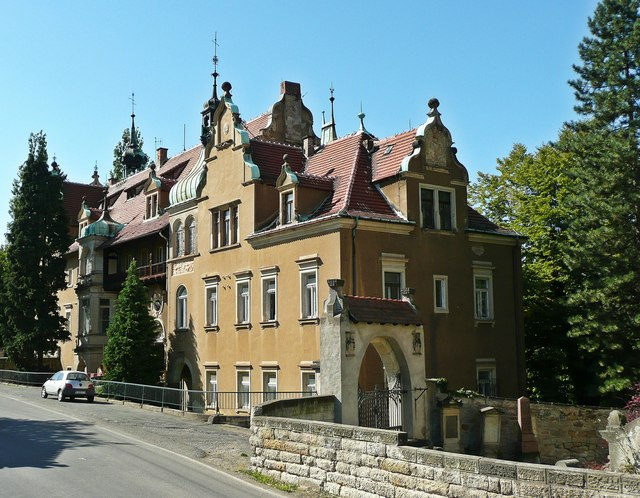

- Coat of arms

- Location of Dohma within Sächsische Schweiz-Osterzgebirge district
- Interactive map of Dohma
- Location within Germany Location within Saxony
- Coordinates: 50°55′N 13°56′E
- Country: Germany
- State: Saxony
- District: Sächsische Schweiz-Osterzgebirge
- Subdivisions: 2

Government
  - Mayor (2021–28): Matthias Heinemann

Area
  - Total: 19.56 km^{2} (7.55 sq mi)
- Elevation: 220 m (720 ft)

Population (2025-12-31)
  - Total: 1,973
  - Density: 100.9/km^{2} (261.2/sq mi)
- Time zone: UTC+01:00 (CET)
  - Summer (DST): UTC+02:00 (CEST)
- Postal codes: 01796
- Dialling codes: 03501
- Vehicle registration: PIR
- Website: www.dohma.de

Dohma is a municipality in the Sächsische Schweiz-Osterzgebirge district, in Saxony, Germany.
