= Lohmen =

- Municipality
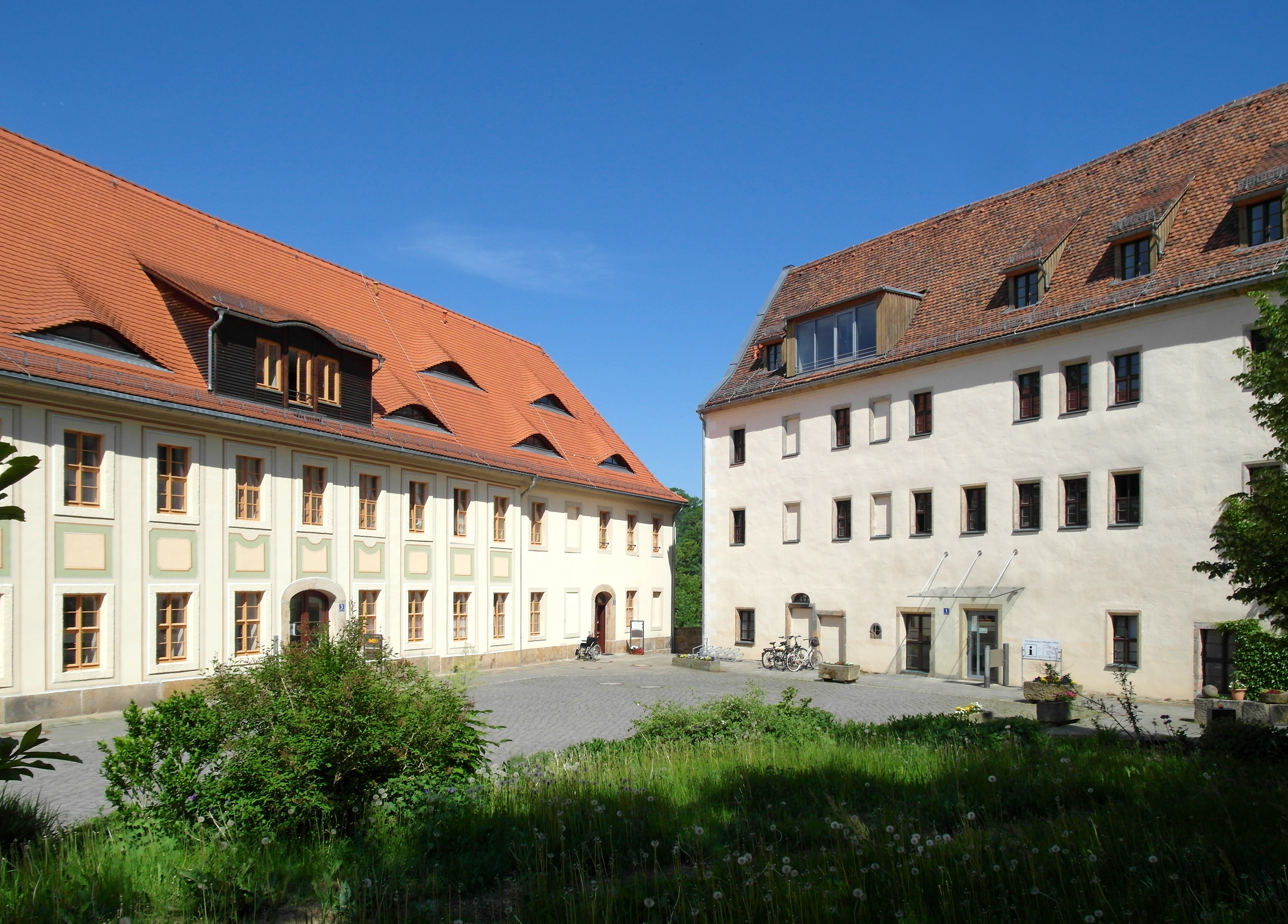
- Lohmen Castle

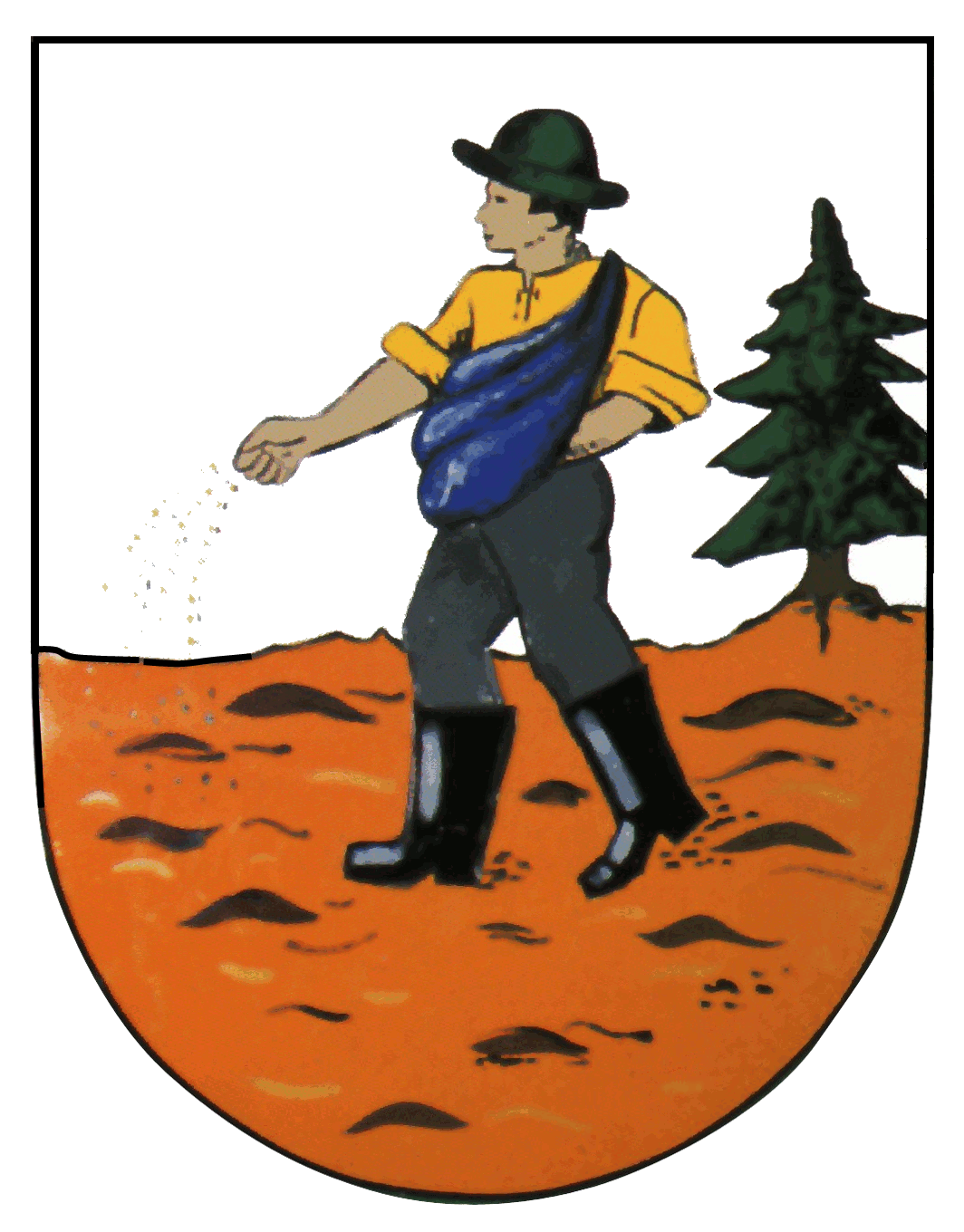
- Coat of arms

- Location of Lohmen within Sächsische Schweiz-Osterzgebirge district
- Interactive map of Lohmen
- Location within Germany Location within Saxony
- Coordinates: 50°59′17″N 14°0′17″E
- Country: Germany
- State: Saxony
- District: Sächsische Schweiz-Osterzgebirge
- Subdivisions: 4

Government
  - Mayor (2022–29): Silke Großmann (CDU)

Area
  - Total: 25.80 km^{2} (9.96 sq mi)
- Elevation: 219 m (719 ft)

Population (2025-12-31)
  - Total: 2,987
  - Density: 115.8/km^{2} (299.9/sq mi)
- Time zone: UTC+01:00 (CET)
  - Summer (DST): UTC+02:00 (CEST)
- Postal codes: 01847
- Dialling codes: 03501, 035024
- Vehicle registration: PIR
- Website: www.lohmen-sachsen.de

Lohmen is a municipality in the Sächsische Schweiz-Osterzgebirge district, in Saxony, Germany.

== History ==
Lohmen was first officially recognized as a village in 1292. The village name comes from the Slovak term lom or "fissure". There were quarries in the area as early as 1200, and were the first and biggest in the region. Lohmen and the kingdom Wehlen-Lohmen belonged to the House of Schönburg until it was traded for other property to Maurice, Elector of Saxony in 1543. In the 19th century it became part of the city of Pirna.

== Public services ==
- Volunteer Fire Department Lohmen
- Lohmen Elementary School
- Kindergarten and daycare services

== Nearby attractions ==
- Bastei
- Lohmen Castle
