= Rabenau, Saxony =

Rabenau
- Town
- Coat of arms

- Location of Rabenau within Sächsische Schweiz-Osterzgebirge district
- Interactive map of Rabenau
- Location within Germany Location within Saxony
- Coordinates: 50°58′N 13°38′E
- Country: Germany
- State: Saxony
- District: Sächsische Schweiz-Osterzgebirge

Government
  - Mayor (2022–29): Thomas Paul (CDU)

Area
  - Total: 30.73 km^{2} (11.86 sq mi)
- Elevation: 250–420 m (820–1,380 ft)

Population (2025-12-31)
  - Total: 4,331
  - Density: 140.9/km^{2} (365.0/sq mi)
- Time zone: UTC+01:00 (CET)
  - Summer (DST): UTC+02:00 (CEST)
- Postal codes: 01734
- Dialling codes: 0351, 03504
- Vehicle registration: PIR
- Website: www.rabenau.net

Rabenau (German pronunciation: [ˈʁaːbənaʊ]) is a town in the Sächsische Schweiz-Osterzgebirge district, in the Free State of Saxony, Germany. It is situated 8 kilometres (5.0 mi) north of Dippoldiswalde, and 12 kilometres (7.5 mi) southwest of Dresden (centre).

== Personality ==
- Karl von Miltitz (1490–1529), papal nuncio
- Cornelius Schnauber (1939–2014), literary critic, author, grew up in Rabenau
- Hans-Jürgen Kreische (born 1947), soccer player of the GDR, grew up in Rabenau
- Daniel Rosin (born 1980), professional football player, grew up in Rabenau

== List of mayors ==
This list contains the democratically elected mayors since 1990

- 1990–1994: Frank Schoenherr (CDU)
- 1994–2008: Gerd Hilbert (FDP)
- 2009: Thomas Paul (CDU)
