= Pretzschendorf =

- Ortsteil of Klingenberg
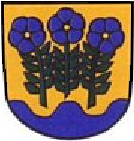
- Coat of arms
- Interactive map of Pretzschendorf
- Location within Germany Location within Saxony
- Coordinates: 50°52′N 13°31′E
- Country: Germany
- State: Saxony
- District: Sächsische Schweiz-Osterzgebirge
- Municipality: Klingenberg
- Subdivisions: 5

Area
  - Total: 49.85 km^{2} (19.25 sq mi)
- Elevation: 325–508 m (1,066–1,667 ft)

Population (2011-12-31)
  - Total: 4,069
  - Density: 81.62/km^{2} (211.4/sq mi)
- Time zone: UTC+01:00 (CET)
  - Summer (DST): UTC+02:00 (CEST)
- Postal codes: 01738, 01744, 01774
- Dialling codes: 035202, 035058, 037326
- Vehicle registration: PIR
- Website: www.pretzschendorf.de

Pretzschendorf (German pronunciation: [ˈpʁɛtʃn̩ˌdɔʁf]) is a village and a former municipality in the Sächsische Schweiz-Osterzgebirge district, in Saxony, Germany. Since 31 December 2012, it is part of the municipality Klingenberg.
