= Liebstadt =

- Town
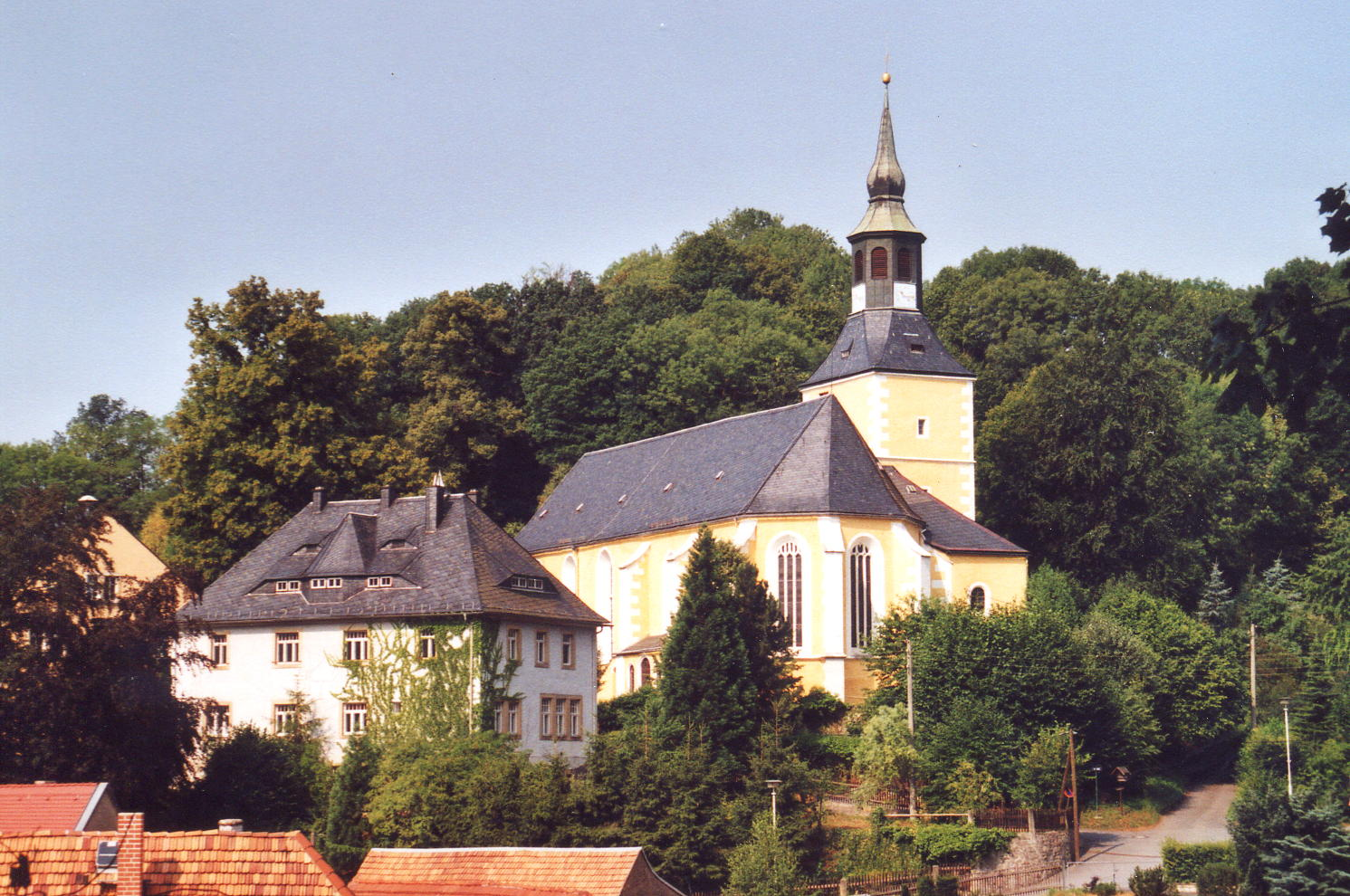
- Lutheran church

- Coat of arms

- Location of Liebstadt within Sächsische Schweiz-Osterzgebirge district
- Interactive map of Liebstadt
- Location within Germany Location within Saxony
- Coordinates: 50°51′53″N 13°51′20″E
- Country: Germany
- State: Saxony
- District: Sächsische Schweiz-Osterzgebirge
- Subdivisions: 8

Government
  - Mayor (2023–30): Kristin Grahl

Area
  - Total: 37.36 km^{2} (14.42 sq mi)
- Elevation: 220–595 m (722–1,952 ft)

Population (2025-12-31)
  - Total: 1,190
  - Density: 31.9/km^{2} (82.5/sq mi)
- Time zone: UTC+01:00 (CET)
  - Summer (DST): UTC+02:00 (CEST)
- Postal codes: 01825
- Dialling codes: 035025
- Vehicle registration: PIR
- Website: www.stadt-liebstadt.de

Liebstadt (German pronunciation: [ˈliːpˌʃtat]) is a town in the Sächsische Schweiz-Osterzgebirge district, in the Free State of Saxony, Germany. It is situated 12 km (7.5 mi) southwest of Pirna, and 23 km (14 mi) southeast of Dresden (centre).
