= Sächsische Schweiz-Osterzgebirge =

Coordinates: 50°54′N 13°50′E

- District
- Flag Coat of arms
- Country: Germany
- State: Saxony
- Capital: Pirna

Government
  - District admin.: Michael Geisler (CDU)

Area
  - Total: 1,654 km^{2} (639 sq mi)

Population (31 December 2025)
  - Total: 242,471
  - Density: 146.6/km^{2} (379.7/sq mi)
- Time zone: UTC+01:00 (CET)
  - Summer (DST): UTC+02:00 (CEST)
- Vehicle registration: PIR, DW, FTL, SEB
- Website: www.landratsamt-pirna.de

Sächsische Schweiz-Osterzgebirge (German pronunciation: [ˈzɛksɪʃə ˈʃvaɪts ˈʔɔstʔeːɐtsɡəˌbɪʁɡə], lit. 'Saxon Switzerland-Eastern Ore Mountains') is a district (Kreis) in Saxony, Germany. It is named after the mountain ranges Saxon Switzerland and Eastern Ore Mountains.

== History ==
The district was established by merging the former districts of Sächsische Schweiz and Weißeritzkreis as part of the district reform of August 2008.

== Geography ==
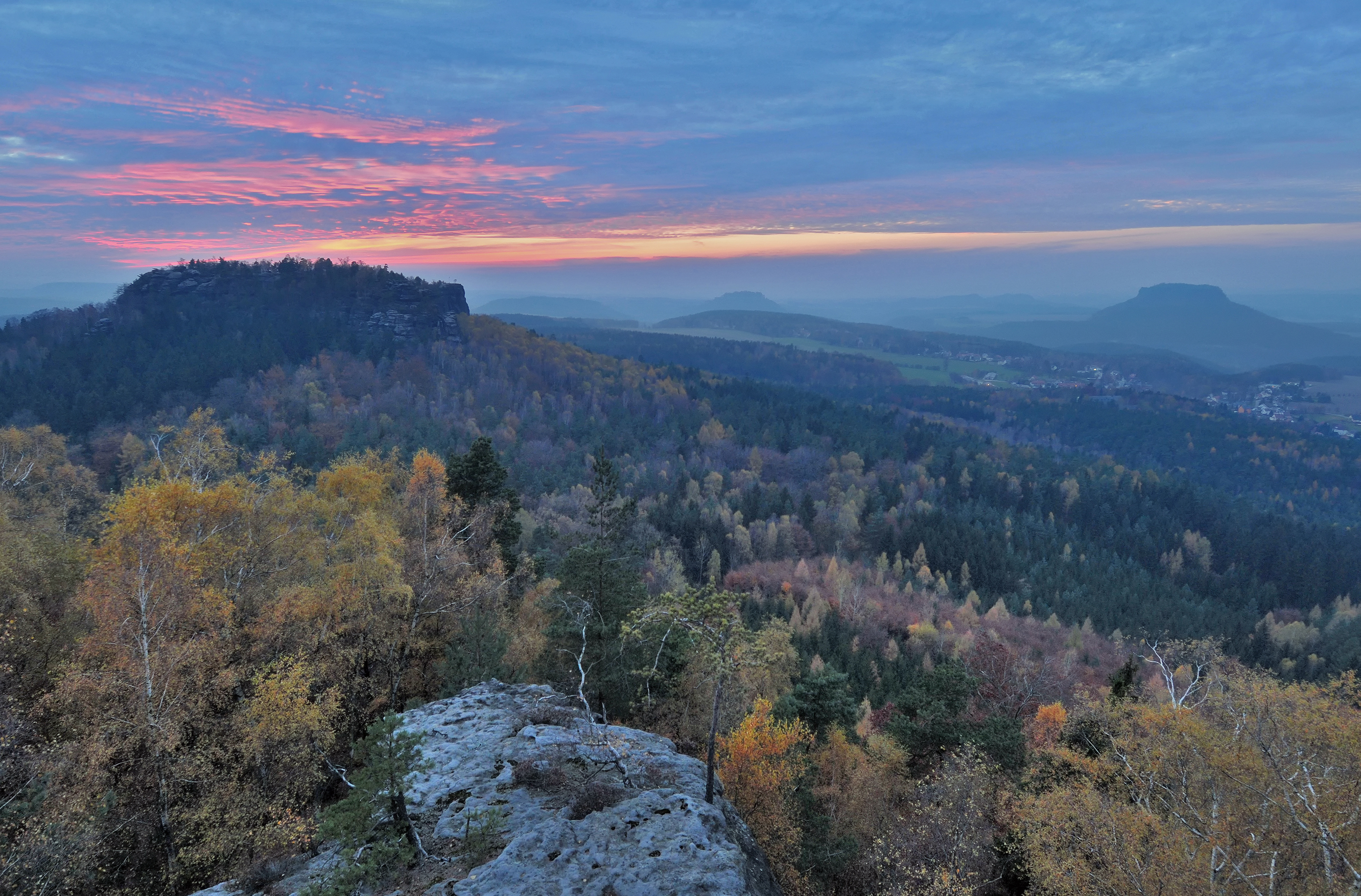
View from the viewpoint on the top of the Papststein. The three large mountains are Gohrisch (left), the Königstein Fortress (in exact centre) and the Lilienstein (right). The village on the right is Kurort Gohrisch.

The district is located between Dresden and the Czech Republic. In the southwestern part of the district the easternmost part of the Ore Mountains (″Erzgebirge") is found, the southeastern part of the district is named Saxon Switzerland, which is part of the Elbe Sandstone Mountains. The main river of the district is the Elbe. The district borders (from the west and clockwise) the districts of Mittelsachsen and Meißen, the urban district Dresden, the district of Bautzen, and the Czech Republic.

== Towns and municipalities ==
Clickable map of towns and municipalities in the district

Towns
Municipalities
1. Altenberg
2. Bad Gottleuba-Berggießhübel
3. Bad Schandau
4. Dippoldiswalde
5. Dohna
6. Freital
7. Glashütte
8. Heidenau
9. Hohnstein
10. Königstein
11. Liebstadt
12. Neustadt in Sachsen
13. Pirna
14. Rabenau
15. Sebnitz
16. Stadt Wehlen
17. Stolpen
18. Tharandt
19. Wilsdruff
1. Bahretal
2. Bannewitz
3. Dohma
4. Dorfhain
5. Dürrröhrsdorf-Dittersbach
6. Gohrisch
7. Hartmannsdorf-Reichenau
8. Hermsdorf
9. Klingenberg
10. Kreischa
11. Lohmen
12. Müglitztal
13. Rathen
14. Rathmannsdorf
15. Reinhardtsdorf-Schöna
16. Rosenthal-Bielatal
17. Struppen

== Transport ==
The district owns the Regionalverkehr Sächsische Schweiz-Osterzgebirge, a transport company that provides bus, ferry and tram services to the district. Bundesautobahn 17 passes through the district and several major railway corridors serve the district providing access to Dresden and other local and long distance destinations.

== See also ==
- Armorial of Sächsische Schweiz-Osterzgebirge
