= Heidenau =

Town in Saxony, Germany

- Town
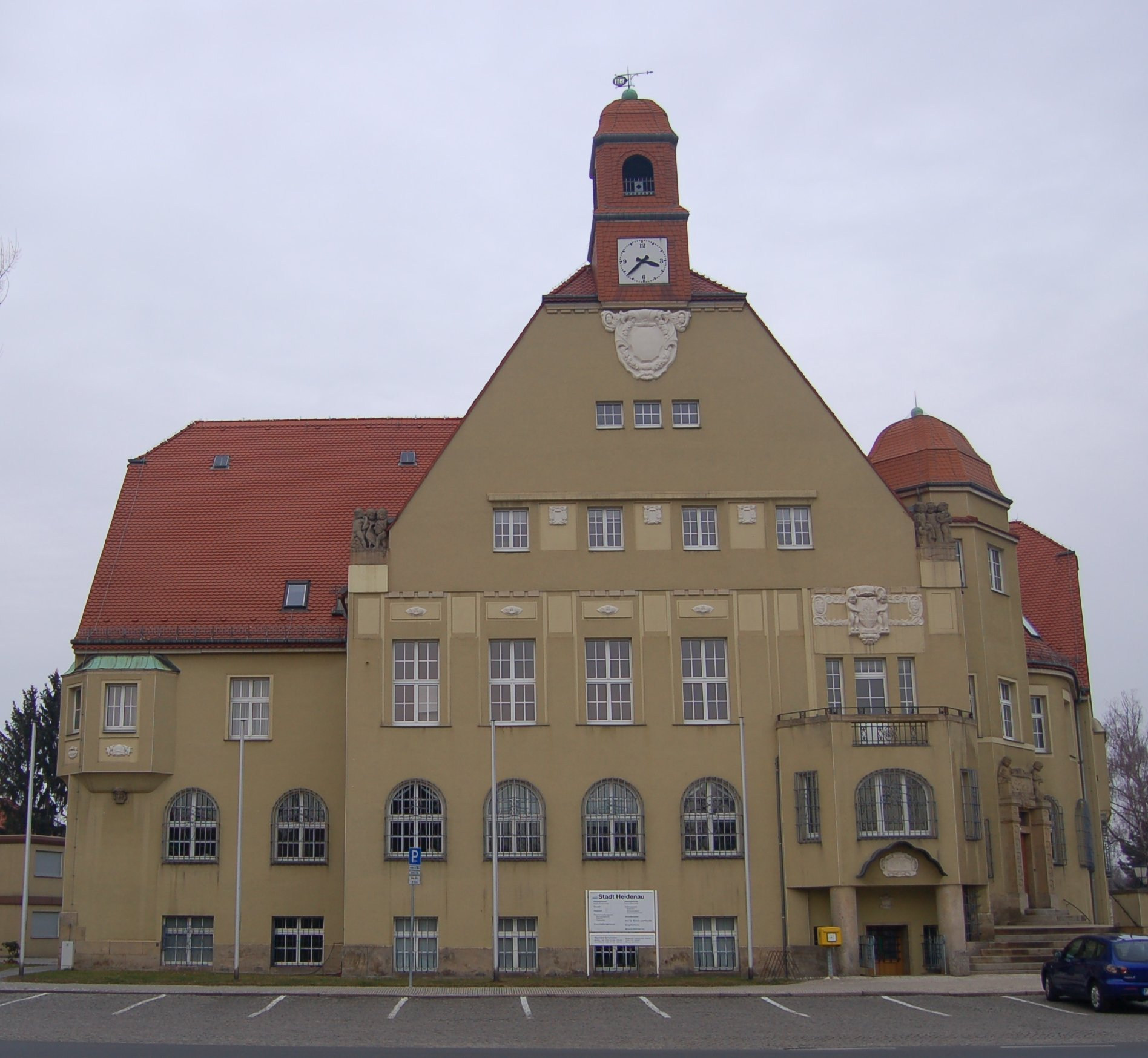
- Town hall

- Coat of arms

- Location of Heidenau within Sächsische Schweiz-Osterzgebirge district
- Interactive map of Heidenau
- Location within Germany Location within Saxony
- Coordinates: 50°59′N 13°52′E
- Country: Germany
- State: Saxony
- District: Sächsische Schweiz-Osterzgebirge

Government
  - Mayor (2019–26): Jürgen Opitz (CDU)

Area
  - Total: 11.07 km^{2} (4.27 sq mi)
- Elevation: 113 m (371 ft)

Population (2025-12-31)
  - Total: 16,597
  - Density: 1,499/km^{2} (3,883/sq mi)
- Time zone: UTC+01:00 (CET)
  - Summer (DST): UTC+02:00 (CEST)
- Postal codes: 01801–01809
- Dialling codes: 03529
- Vehicle registration: PIR
- Website: www.heidenau.de

Heidenau (German pronunciation: [ˈhaɪdənaʊ]) is a town in the Sächsische Schweiz-Osterzgebirge district, in Saxony, Germany. The town is situated on the left bank of the Elbe, 13 km southeast of Dresden (centre).

In 2015, it became known for riots by local far-right forces against the arrival of refugees. In August 2015, authorities were forced to impose a temporary ban on assemblies in Heidenau due to continuous harassment of asylum-seekers.

In September 2026, Heidenau banned new Holocaust "stumbling stone" memorials, known as Stolpersteine, with support from the AfD and CDU.
