= Gohrisch =

- Municipality
- Coat of arms

- Location of Gohrisch within Sächsische Schweiz-Osterzgebirge district
- Interactive map of Gohrisch
- Location within Germany Location within Saxony
- Coordinates: 50°54′35″N 14°6′29″E
- Country: Germany
- State: Saxony
- District: Sächsische Schweiz-Osterzgebirge
- Subdivisions: 4

Government
  - Mayor (2020–27): Christian Naumann

Area
  - Total: 34.78 km^{2} (13.43 sq mi)
- Elevation: 300 m (980 ft)

Population (2025-12-31)
  - Total: 1,732
  - Density: 49.80/km^{2} (129.0/sq mi)
- Time zone: UTC+01:00 (CET)
  - Summer (DST): UTC+02:00 (CEST)
- Postal codes: 01824
- Dialling codes: 03 50 21
- Vehicle registration: PIR
- Website: www.gohrisch.de

== Geography ==
Gohrisch is a picturesque municipality located in the Sächsische Schweiz-Osterzgebirge district, in Saxony, Germany. Nestled in the heart of the Saxon Switzerland National Park, Gohrisch is renowned for its serene, wooded landscapes and unique table mountains. The municipality is situated on a plateau to the left of the Elbe River, with the towns of Bad Schandau and Königstein lying nearby in the Elbe valley. The area is characterized by its climatically balanced environment, making it a popular destination for nature lovers and hikers.

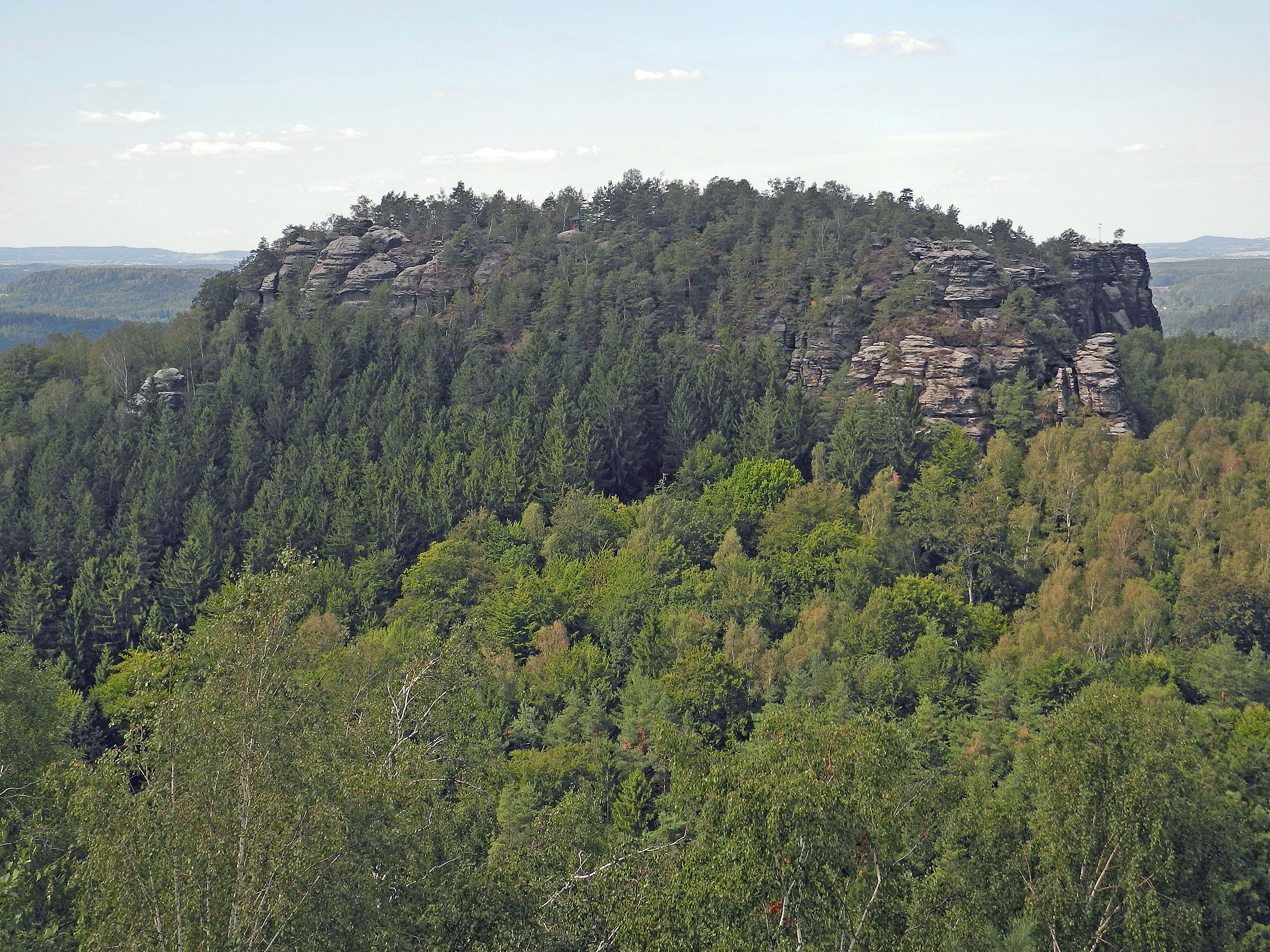
View from the Papststein.

== Judiciary ==
Gohrisch falls under the jurisdiction of the Saxon Switzerland-Eastern Ore Mountains district court. The local administration is responsible for managing municipal affairs, including urban planning, public services, and community welfare. The municipality comprises several districts, including Cunnersdorf, Kleinhennersdorf, Kurort Gohrisch, and Papstdorf. Each district contributes to the overall charm and functionality of Gohrisch, ensuring that residents and visitors alike enjoy a well-maintained and orderly environment.

== History ==
Gohrisch holds a rich historical significance, particularly in the context of its natural and cultural heritage. The region's unique geological formations, such as the Gohrischstein, Papststein, and Kleinhennersdorfer Stein, have been a source of fascination for centuries. These table mountains are not only visually striking but also hold geological importance, offering insights into the area's ancient past.

One of the most notable historical events associated with Gohrisch is its connection to the composer Dmitri Shostakovich. In July 1960, Shostakovich composed his String Quartet No. 8 in Gohrisch. This piece is considered one of his most significant works. To honor his legacy, the International Shostakovich Days have been held annually in Gohrisch since 2010, attracting listeners and musicians from around the world.
