= Struppen =

- Municipality
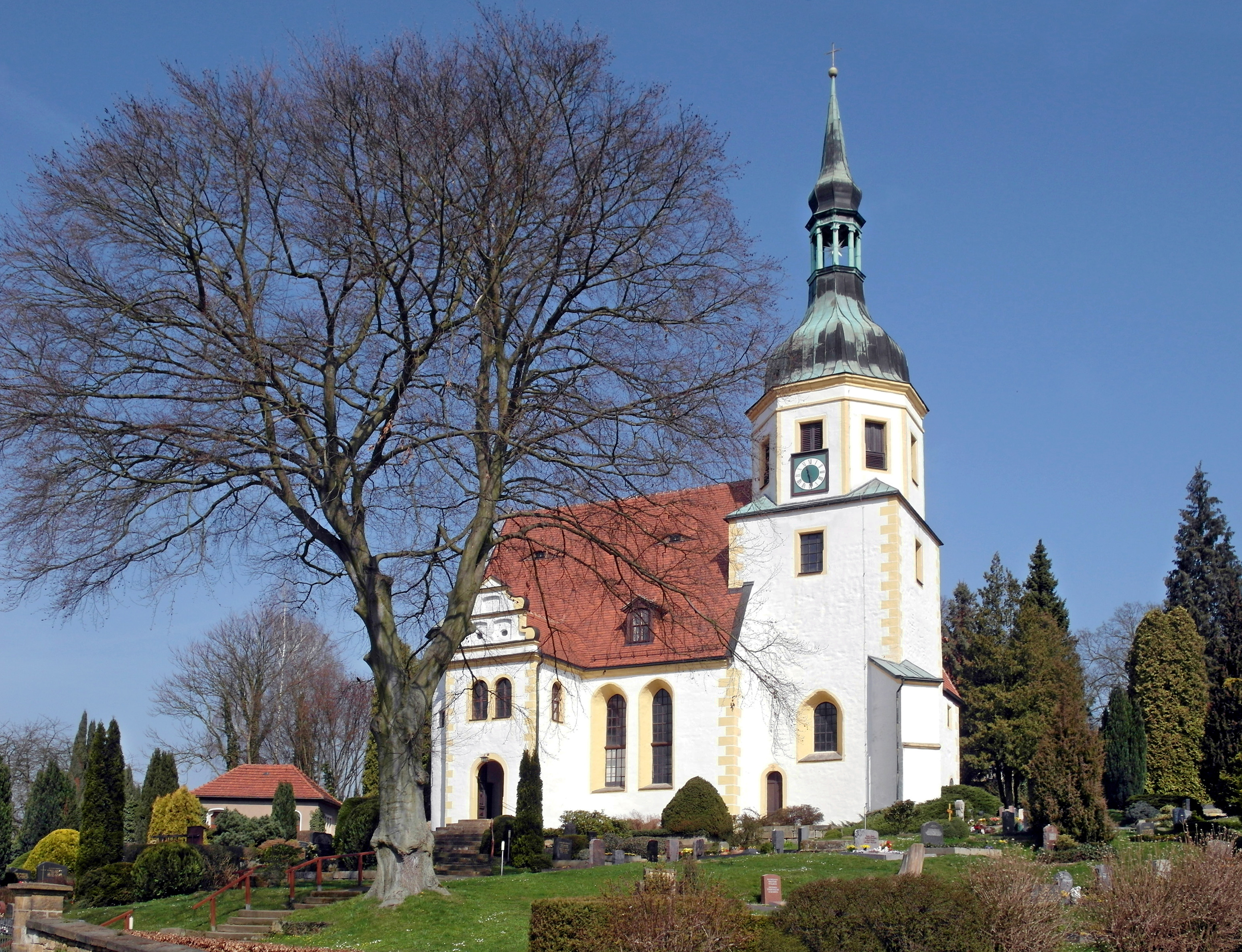
- Lutheran church

- Coat of arms

- Location of Struppen within Sächsische Schweiz-Osterzgebirge district
- Interactive map of Struppen
- Location within Germany Location within Saxony
- Coordinates: 50°56′N 14°1′E
- Country: Germany
- State: Saxony
- District: Sächsische Schweiz-Osterzgebirge
- Subdivisions: 5

Government
  - Mayor (2022–29): Michael Sachse

Area
  - Total: 20.68 km^{2} (7.98 sq mi)
- Elevation: 123–337 m (404–1,106 ft)

Population (2025-12-31)
  - Total: 2,368
  - Density: 114.5/km^{2} (296.6/sq mi)
- Time zone: UTC+01:00 (CET)
  - Summer (DST): UTC+02:00 (CEST)
- Postal codes: 01796
- Dialling codes: 035020
- Vehicle registration: PIR
- Website: www.struppen.de

Struppen is a municipality in the Sächsische Schweiz-Osterzgebirge district, in Saxony, Germany.
