= Dippoldiswalde =

- Town
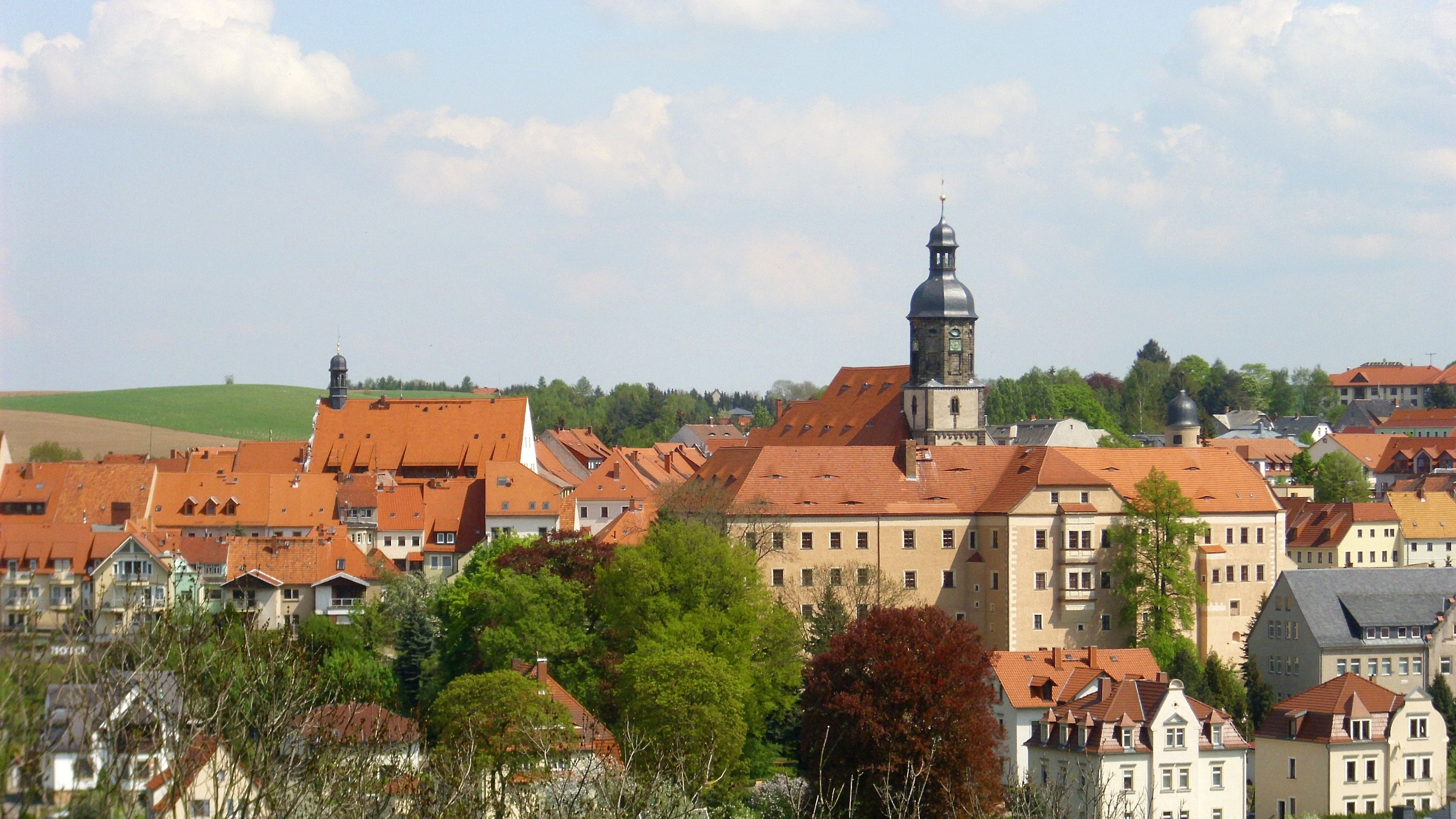

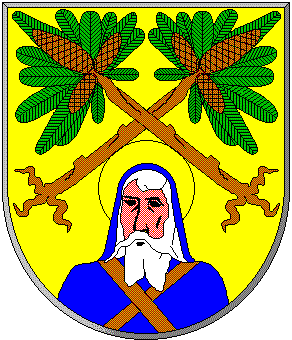
- Coat of arms

- Location of Dippoldiswalde within Sächsische Schweiz-Osterzgebirge district
- Interactive map of Dippoldiswalde
- Location within Germany Location within Saxony
- Coordinates: 50°53′36″N 13°40′0″E
- Country: Germany
- State: Saxony
- District: Sächsische Schweiz-Osterzgebirge
- Subdivisions: 21

Government
  - Mayor (2019–26): Kerstin Körner (CDU)

Area
  - Total: 103.99 km^{2} (40.15 sq mi)
- Elevation: 375 m (1,230 ft)

Population (2025-12-31)
  - Total: 13,880
  - Density: 133.5/km^{2} (345.7/sq mi)
- Time zone: UTC+01:00 (CET)
  - Summer (DST): UTC+02:00 (CEST)
- Postal codes: 01744
- Dialling codes: 03504
- Vehicle registration: PIR, DW, FTL, SEB
- Website: www.dippoldiswalde.de

Dippoldiswalde (German pronunciation: [ˌdɪpɔldɪsˈvaldə]; Saxon: Dipps) is a town in Saxony, Germany, part of the Sächsische Schweiz-Osterzgebirge district. It is situated 23 km east of Freiberg, and 18 km south of Dresden.

The town is situated on the Weisseritz railway, a narrow gauge railway powered by steam locomotives.
