= Schill+Seilacher =

German chemical company

- Company type: GmbH
- Industry: Chemical industry
- Founded: November 1, 1877; 148 years ago in Heilbronn
- Founders: Christoph Seilacher and Karl Schill
- Headquarters: Böblingen, Germany
- Key people: Gordian Schilling; Kristina Platkowski
- Number of employees: 407
- Website: www.schillseilacher.de

Schill+Seilacher, also known by its brand name Struktol, is a German chemical company. It was founded in 1877, and produces chemicals for the textile and paper industry.

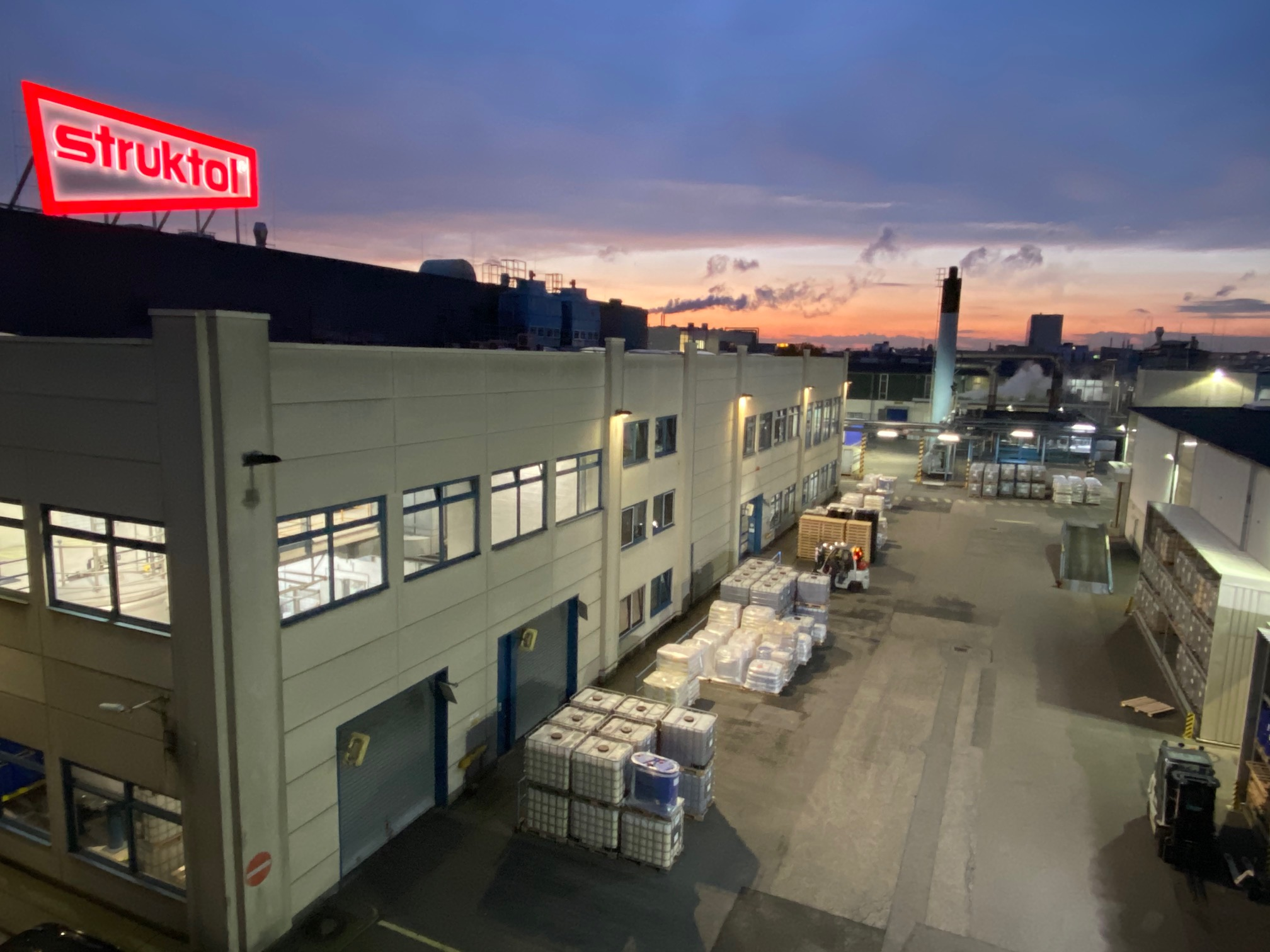
Struktol-production site in Hamburg, Germany (2022)

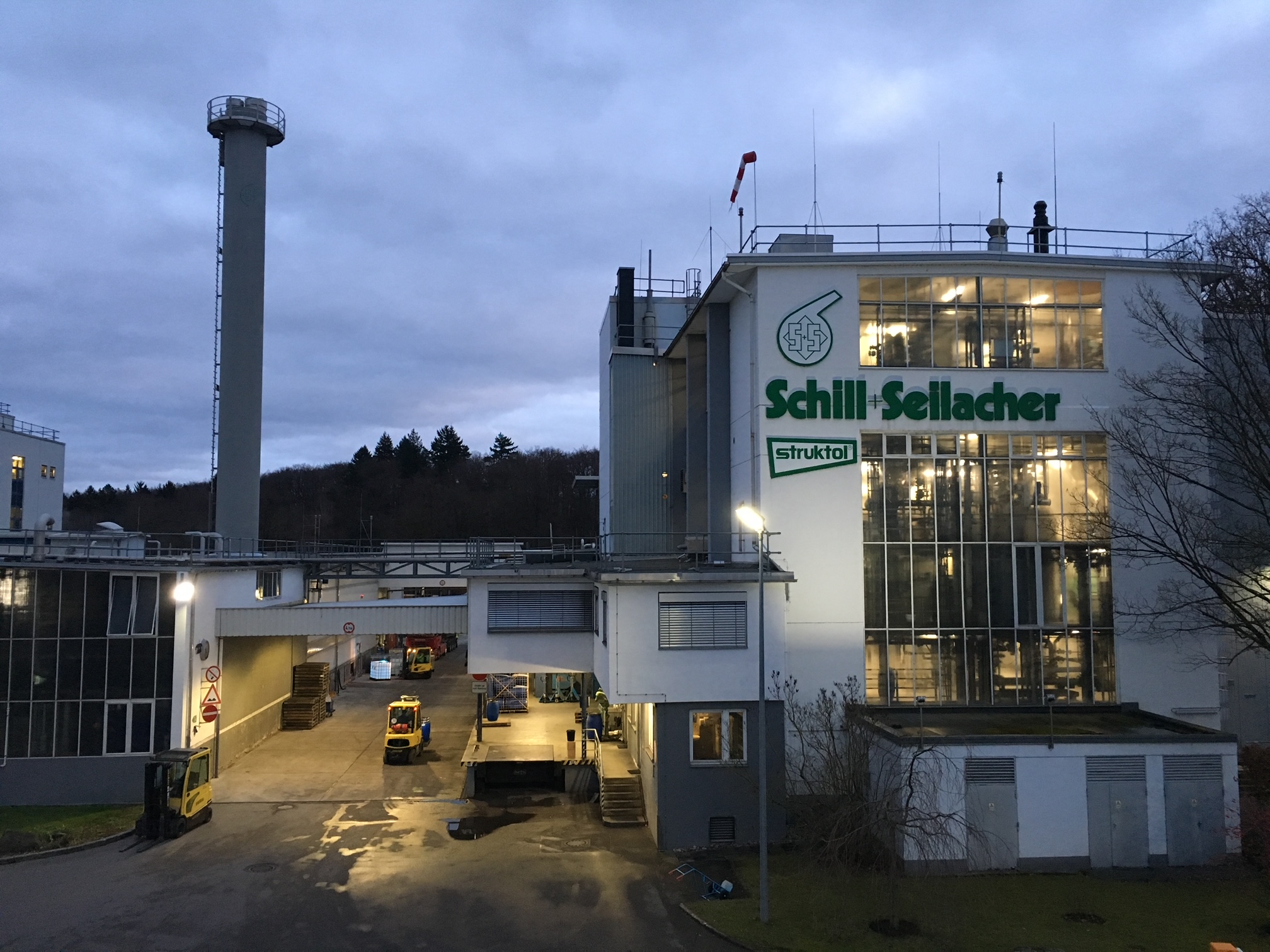
Schill+Seilacher production site in Böblingen, Germany (2019)

== History ==
On November 1, 1877, the brothers-in-law Christoph Seilacher and Karl Schill founded the company in Heilbronn as a chemical factory for the manufacture of specialty products for the leather industry. Due to rapid growth, four years later they decided to relocate the business to Feuerbach, now a district of Stuttgart. In October 1886, Schill+Seilacher applied for a patent for a process for the production of dégras tanning fat under the patent number D.R.P. 39952. Because it combined the properties of a fat and an emulsifier, it was one of the most important products in emulsion technology, but was not used outside the leather industry. At the turn of the century, chrome tanning became more important in leather processing, and eventually replaced dégras-based products altogether.

Christoph Seilacher feared a loss of sales for his dégras products, and, therefore developed a photo gelatine as well as the necessary pouring, cooling and application machines. The product was supplied to firms such as Kodak, Lumière in Paris and Agfa. The company later expanded its production of process additives. Schill+Seilacher opened a branch office in Hamburg in 1925 to benefit from the port's international trade routes. Meanwhile, the company began producing more chemicals for textile finishing. In the late 1920s, the first additives for rubber processing were produced. During World War II, the plant facilities in Feuerbach and Hamburg were destroyed in a bombing raid. Afterwards, it was decided to relocate production to Böblingen, southwest of Stuttgart. After the end of the war, the plant in Hamburg was rebuilt almost on the same site. The Böblingen plant was enlarged and modernized as business expanded. It produces chemicals such as sophorolipids, and amino acid surfactants. After World War II, the company was handed over by Christoph Seilacher to his granddaughter Ingeborg Gross, who managed it until shortly before her death in 2019.

In the early 1950s, the company developed a process for tanning and fatliquoring animal hides with the salts of sulfonated fatty acid amides. In the 1960s, Schiller+Seilacher began producing leather softeners at its Hamburg plant. In 1977, the company expanded into the USA and founded the Struktol Company of America in Stow, Ohio. It produces various chemicals, e.g. additives for the tire industry, such as compatibilizers.

In 1997, Schill + Seilacher opened a new plant in Neundorf, near Pirna where it produces chemicals such as the flame retardant 9,10-dihydro-9-oxa-10-phosphaphenanthrene 10-oxide. On December 1, 2014, 5 metric tons of trimethyl phosphite exploded there during an Arbuzov reaction, killing one worker and causing injuries to four. According to the Saxon State Office for the Environment, the cause of the explosion was the addition of too little solvent toluene, i.e. human error. After controversies about the reconstruction, the Freiberg University of Mining and Technology developed a new safety concept for the plant. It was reopened in August 2019.

== Company owners ==
From its foundation in 1877 until 2019, the Schill+Seilacher group was family-owned. The last owner of the founding family was Ingeborg Gross. Before her death in 2019, she transferred the group to the Ingeborg Gross Foundation based in Hamburg, and the Pro Humanitate Foundation based in Liechtenstein, which she had established specifically for this purpose.
