= Eisenkammer Pirna =

Coordinates: 50°57′44″N 13°56′31″E

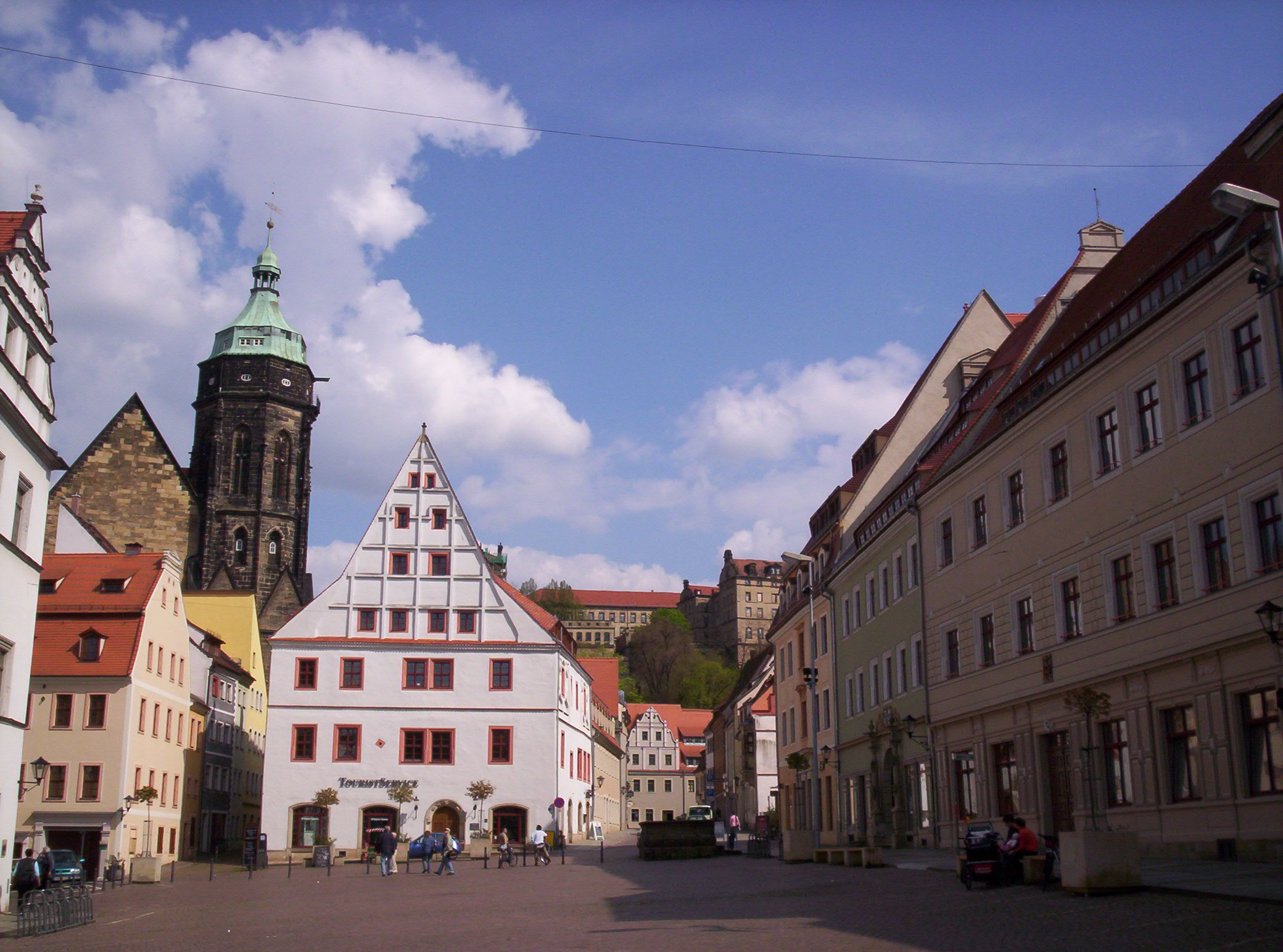
Market square in Pirna with St. Mary's Church, the Canaletto House and (r) House No. 10, 1472-1686 seat of the Eisenkammer

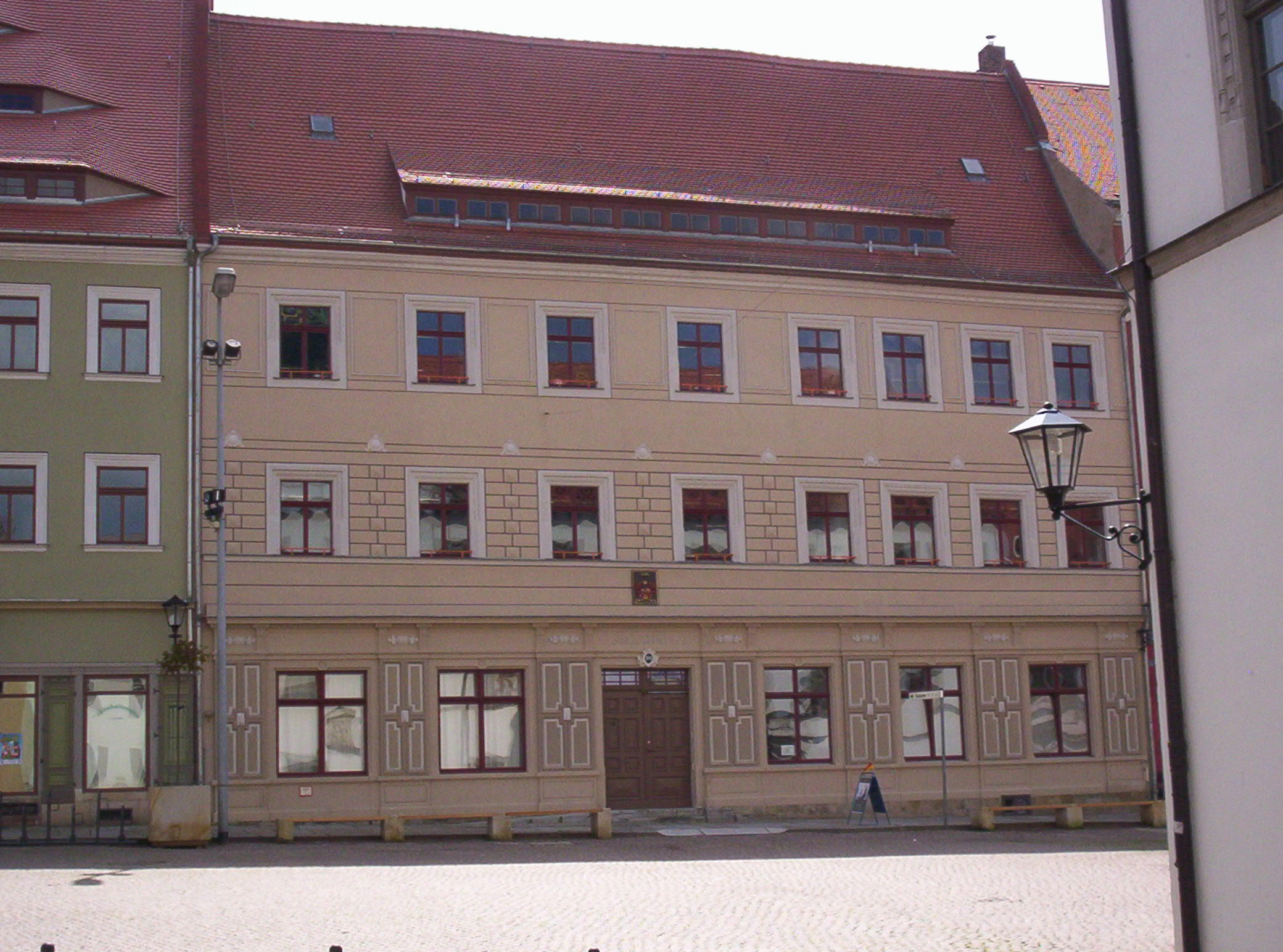
Haus am Markt 10 in Pirna, today the community hall

The Eisenkammer Pirna ("Iron Chamber") was an Electoral Saxon institution with the task of distributing and allocating the iron products within its area of responsibility (Revier), the Pirna Iron Mining District (Pirnaer Eisenrevier). It was founded in 1472 and existed until 1686. It had its seat in the house Am Markt 10, the present town community hall, in the Old Town (Altstadt) of Pirna.

Other Eisenkammern existed as authorities regulating the iron trade for instance in the former Austria iron centres of Steyr and Scheibbs.

== History ==
Iron ore was mined in the Eastern Ore Mountains probably already in the 13th century and has been confirmed for the town of Berggießhübel in an accounting dated 1450. Berggießhübel, being the centre of iron mining in the Pirna district, was the seat of a local mining authority, whose regulations of 1546 applied to the whole of the Pirna mining district. Patrons of the mines were the Electors of Saxony and the noble families von Bünau of Liebstadt and von Bernstein of Ottendorf. The products made from the local iron ore were known as Pirnisches Eisen ("Pirna iron") and were in high demand for two main reasons:

- Pirna iron was highly esteemed for having been made from magnetite, the iron ore of the highest grade. The historian Petrus Albinus notes (place names with historical spelling):

″The third and most excellent iron is made in Lawenstein and Berggieshübel and Glasshütten / all three are situated not far from the cities Dreßden and Pirna. Hence many call the iron / that is made there Pirnisch / and praise it to be more malleable than the Lusatian one / which otherwise is still widely traded.″

- The Electorate of Saxony was generally short of iron, which was mainly needed for armaments and for the extraction of silver, tin, and copper from the mines. The preamble of the 1546 mining regulations of Berggießhübel states that

″in our silver and other mines, also otherwise in our lands and principality a notable want of iron is felt.″

Hence, the rulers of the country established a monopoly on the iron trade already in 1472, and on this occasion also the Eisenkammer Pirna in order to ensure the supply of iron for the mines and arsenals. Accordingly, all iron products from the Pirna mining district (around 300 tonnes per year in the 16th century) had to be delivered to the Eisenkammer for a fixed price, and the latter sold them to the Dresden arsenal, the mines, towns, and guilds. For example, the saltworks of Poserna were built in 1572 using Pirna iron almost exclusively.

The purpose of the monopoly was not profit, but the assurance of a sufficient supply of iron. Hence the iron trade turned out to operate with a loss, and in 1583 the Council of Pirna was ordered to take over the tasks of the Eisenkammer. Already 20 Saxon town were obligated to purchase their iron exclusively from Eisenkammer Pirna, and Prince-Elector Augustus now confirmed his order that all iron in the Electorate had to be procured from there. This, however, proved difficult to enforce.

The historian Uwe Schirmer summarizes: "The purpose of the public economic activity in the small Pirna iron mining district thus conformed principally to the demand of the mines and salt works as well as to the politically-military and early mercantilist interests of the rulers of the country."

== Sources ==
- Petrus Albinus: Meißnische Land- u. Berg-Chronica, 1589/1590 (XVI. Titel, p. 134).
- Uwe Schirmer: Öffentliches Wirtschaften in Kursachsen (1553-1631). Motive – Strategien – Strukturen. in: Jürgen Schneider (Hrsg.): Öffentliches und privates Wirtschaften in sich wandelnden Wirtschaftsordnungen. Steiner Verlag, Stuttgart 2001, ISBN 978-3-515-07868-9
- Gunter H. Schmidt: Vom Pirnischen Eisen. Aus der Geschichte der alten Hämmer und Hütten im Raum Pirna, Pirna 1984, p. 49-52.
- Gunter H. Schmidt: Der Eysingberg zum Gishobel als Grundlage des Sächsischen Eisenhandelsmonopols der kurfürstlichen Eisenkammer in Pirna. in: Ferdinand Opll (publ.): Stadt und Eisen. Linz 1992, p. 359-376, ISBN 3-900387-51-6
