= Bahretal =

- Municipality
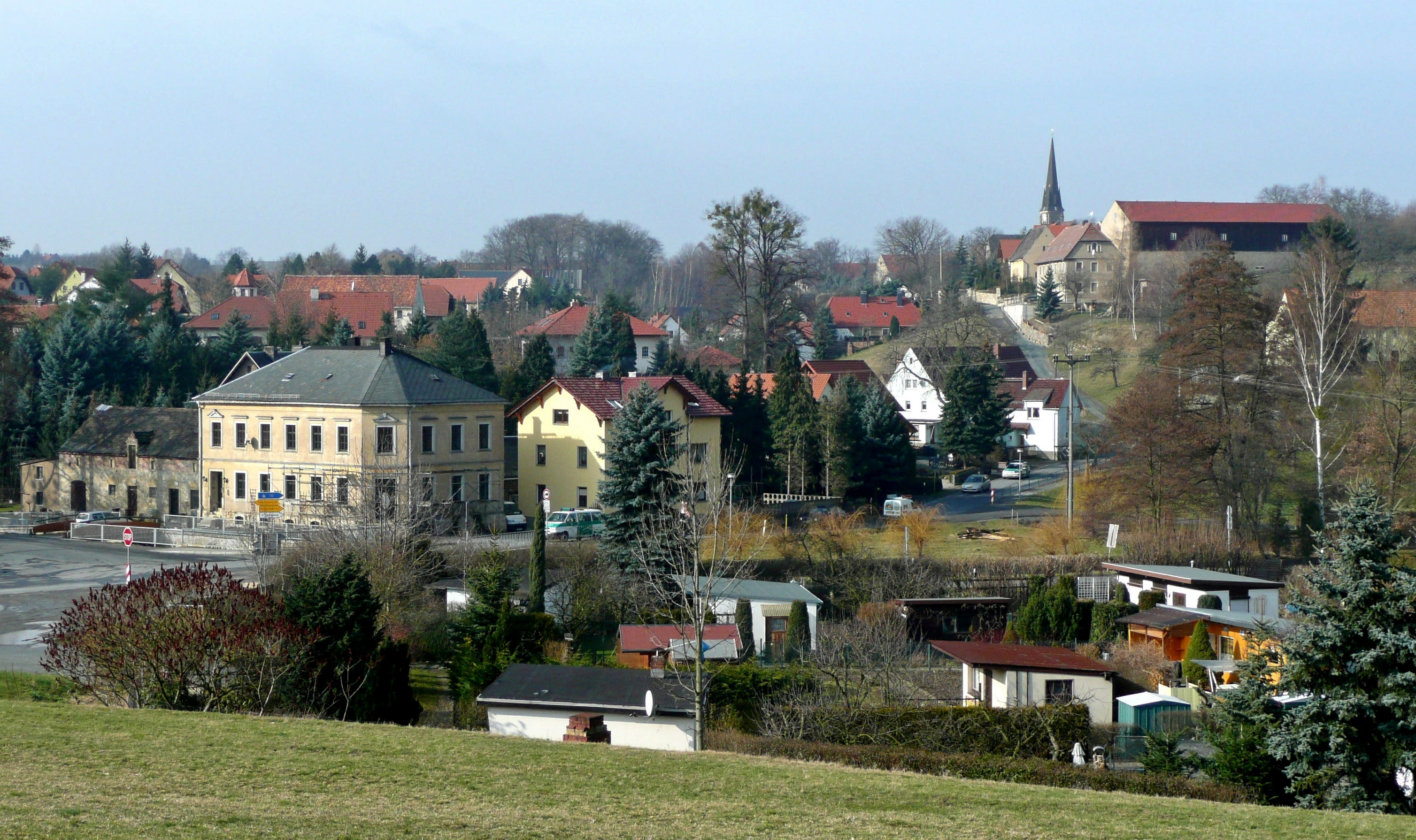
- Municipal part of Friedrichswalde

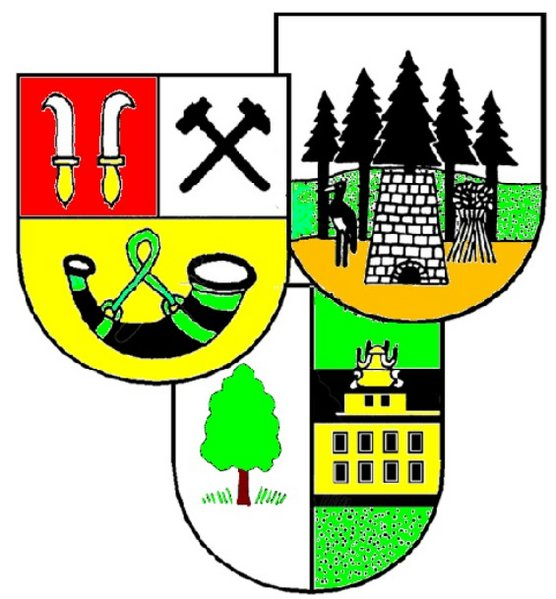
- Coat of arms

- Location of Bahretal within Sächsische Schweiz-Osterzgebirge district
- Interactive map of Bahretal
- Location within Germany Location within Saxony
- Coordinates: 50°53′15″N 13°54′0″E
- Country: Germany
- State: Saxony
- District: Sächsische Schweiz-Osterzgebirge
- Subdivisions: 8

Government
  - Mayor (2021–28): Ronny Schietzold

Area
  - Total: 36.46 km^{2} (14.08 sq mi)
- Elevation: 240–370 m (790–1,210 ft)

Population (2025-12-31)
  - Total: 2,076
  - Density: 56.94/km^{2} (147.5/sq mi)
- Time zone: UTC+01:00 (CET)
  - Summer (DST): UTC+02:00 (CEST)
- Postal codes: 01819
- Dialling codes: 035023, 035025
- Vehicle registration: PIR
- Website: https://gemeinde-bahretal.de/

Bahretal (German pronunciation: [ˈbaːʁətaːl], lit. 'Bahre Valley') is a municipality in the Sächsische Schweiz-Osterzgebirge district in Saxony, Germany. It is situated in the northeastern foothills of the Ore Mountains, between Bad Gottleuba-Berggießhübel and Dohna. It consists of several small villages, situated in the valleys of the rivers Bahre and Seidewitz as well as on the heights between the valleys.

The municipality is named after the small river Bahre which flows through it. Its source is located 1.5 km north of Breitenau in Bad Gottleuba-Berggießhübel at 505 m. It flows into the Seidewitz near Zuschendorf. In order to prevent flooding, a retention basin was built between Borna-Gersdorf and Friedrichswalde-Ottendorf in 1970.

== Municipality subdivisions ==
Bahretal consists of the following villages:

- Borna
- Friedrichswalde
- Gersdorf
- Göppersdorf
- Nentmannsdorf
- Niederseidewitz
- Ottendorf
- Wingendorf

== History ==
=== Borna ===
Borna (German pronunciation: [ˈbɔʁna]) probably belonged to the castle of Dohna at first. In the beginning of the 15th century it became part of the lands of Schloss Weesenstein. It changed hands quite often, between the owners of Liebstadt, Weesenstein, Gersdorf, Ottendorf, Krebs and Giesenstein in the subsequent years. In 1731, Borna was in the possession of the count Maurice de Saxe. The village church was first mentioned in 1388. It belonged to the parish of Pirna, and after the Reformation was introduced in 1539 to Liebstadt. In 1894, Borna built its own office.

=== Friedrichswalde ===
Friedrichswalde belonged to the Schloss Weesenstein. The church was first mentioned in 1311, and belonged to the parish of Pirna.

=== Gersdorf ===
Until the 17th century Gersdorf was divided into two villages: Obergersdorf (also: Gabel) and Niedergersdorf. They initially belonged to Dohna, but fell to the Margraves of Dresden. A manor was built in Gersdorf, and an artificial ruin was built around 1800.
