= Bahre =

River in Germany

Location
- Country: Germany
- State: Saxony

Physical characteristics
- Mouth
  - location: Seidewitz
  - coordinates: 50°56′9″N 13°55′17″E

Basin features
- Progression: Seidewitz→ Gottleuba→ Elbe→ North Sea

Bahre (German pronunciation: [ˈbaːʁə]) is a river of Saxony, Germany. It is a tributary of the Elbe through the Seidewitz and the Gottleuba. Its source is in the eastern Ore Mountains. It gave its name to the municipality Bahretal.

== See also ==
- List of rivers of Saxony
