= Zehista =

Coordinates: 50°56′25″N 13°55′35″E

Zehista is a village in the municipality of Pirna in the Sächsische Schweiz-Osterzgebirge district of Saxony, Germany. It was incorporated into Pirna in 1930. The place was mentioned for the first time in 1355. It lies in the valley of the river Seidewitz, 2.5 km southwest of Pirna town centre.

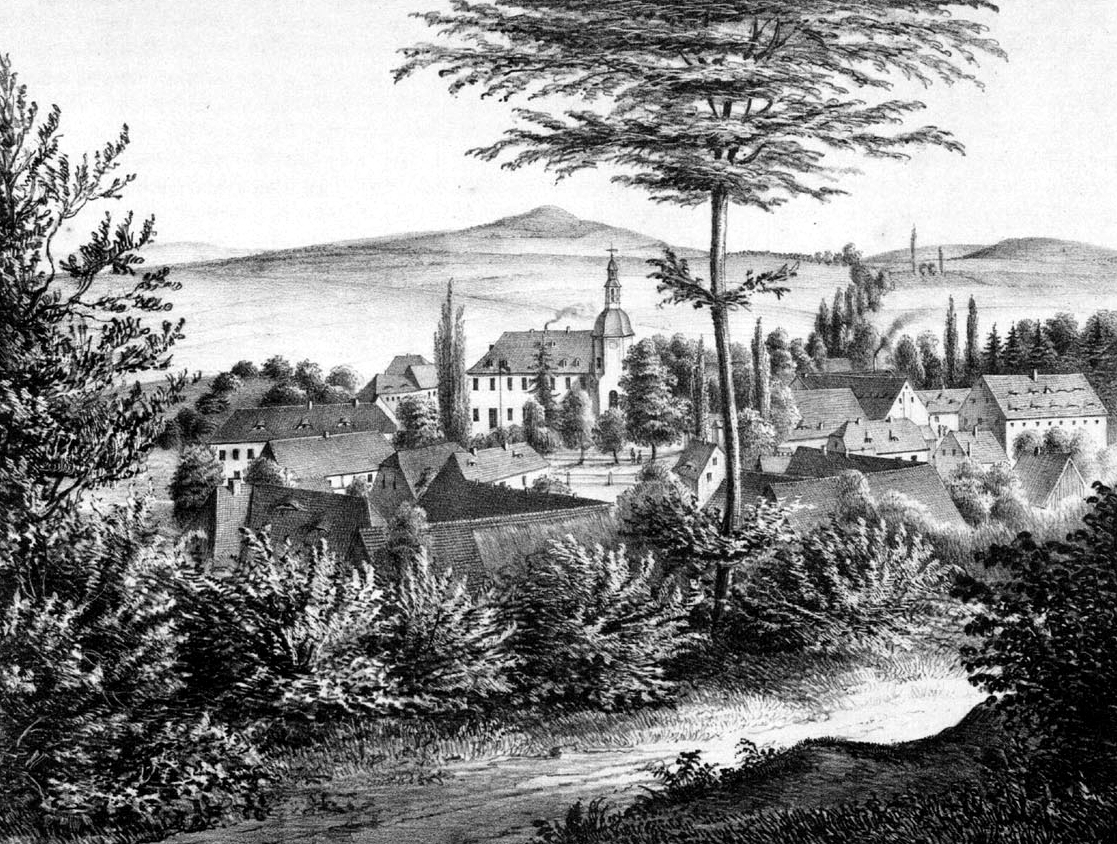
Zehista around 1860

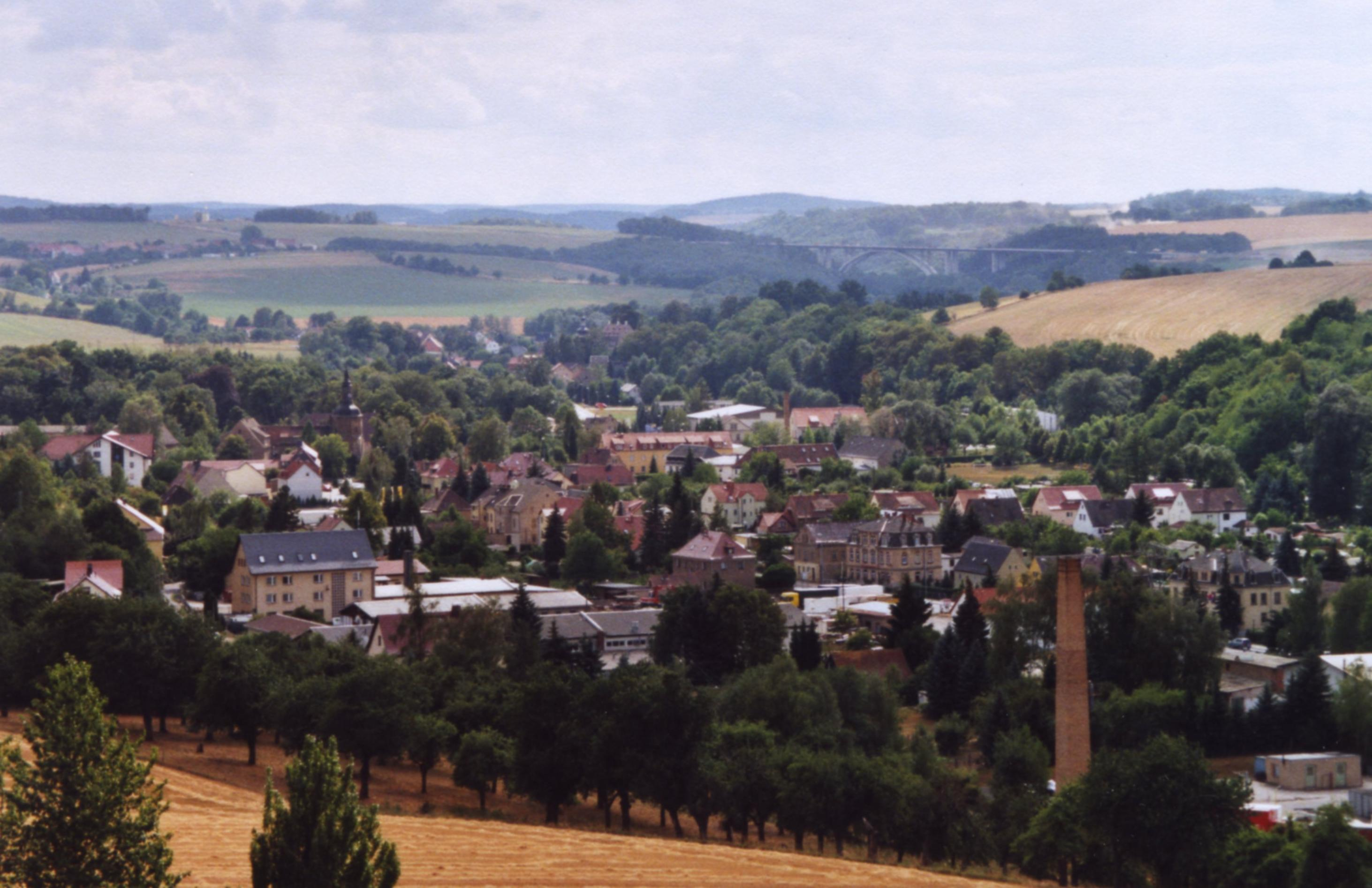
Zehista 2006
