= Posta, Pirna =

Coordinates: 50°57′55″N 13°57′30″E

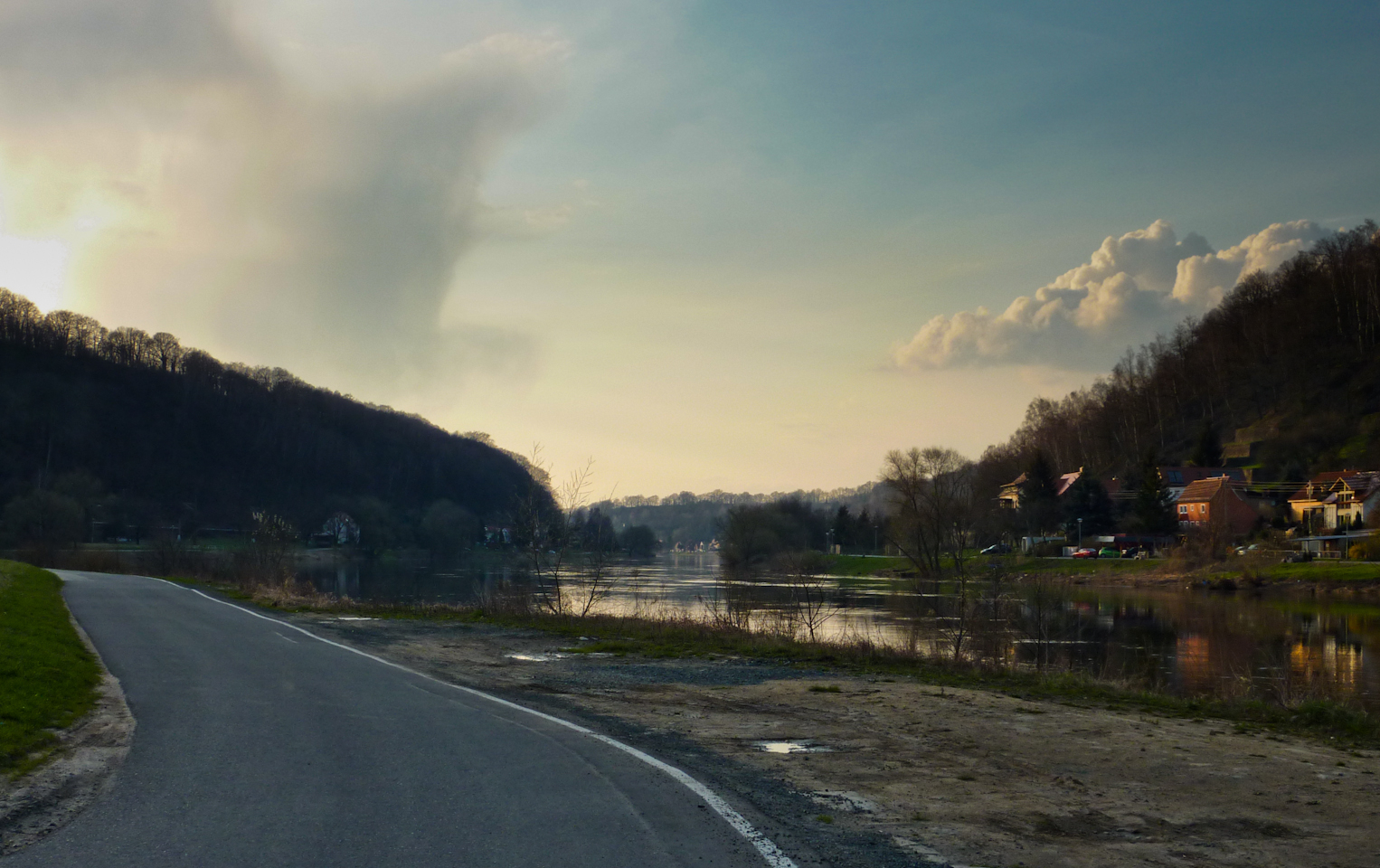
View of Posta, from the Elbe cycle path near Niedervogelgesang, Pirna districts

Posta is a village in the municipality of Pirna, in Saxony, Germany. It was informally incorporated into Pirna in 1919 and formally in 1922. It consists of Niederposta (Lower Posta) and Oberposta (Upper Posta). The place was mentioned for the first time in 1417. It is situated on the right bank of the river Elbe, northeast of Pirna town centre.
