= Rottwerndorf =

Village in Germany

Coordinates: 50°55′20″N 13°57′45″E

Rottwerndorf is a village in the municipality of Pirna, in Saxony, Germany. It was incorporated into Pirna in 1923. The place was mentioned for the first time in 1337. It is situated on the river Gottleuba, 5 km (3.1 mi) south of Pirna town centre. The village was characterized by quarryman and agriculture.

There is a Renaissance-era castle from the 16th century in the village.

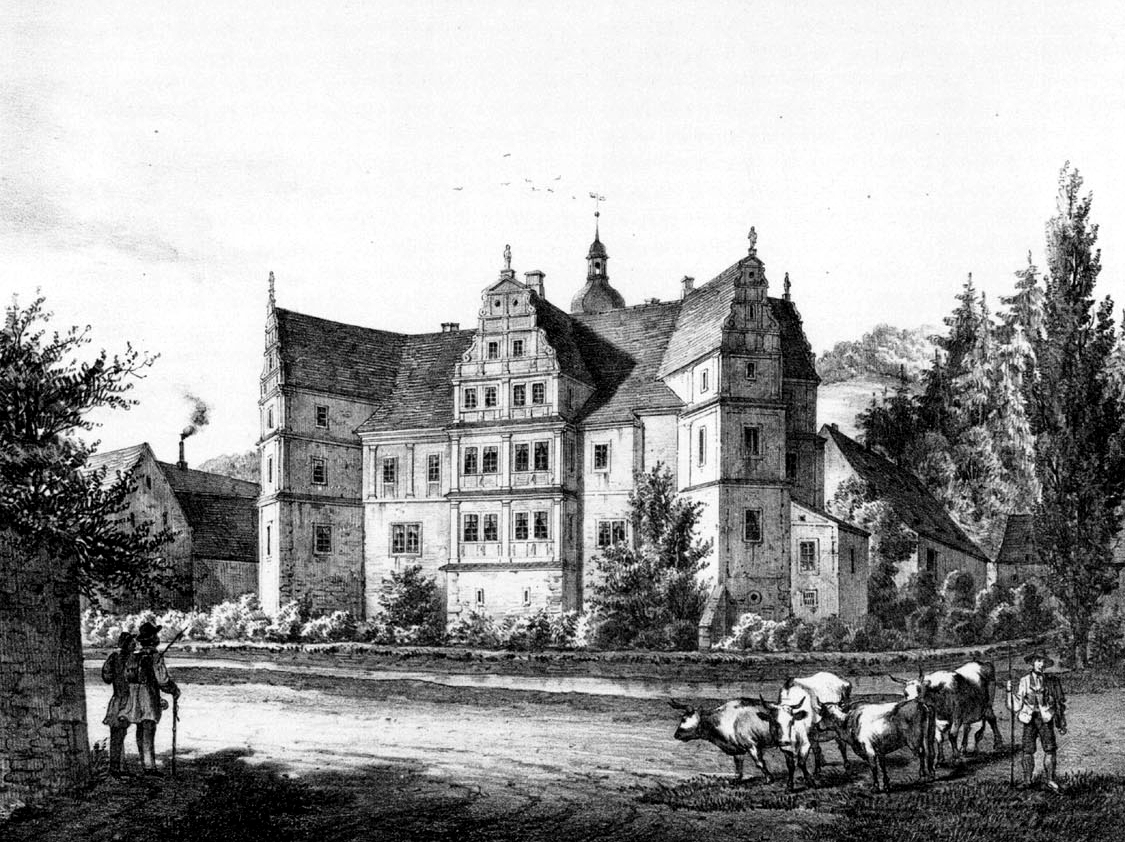
Rottwerndorf castle around 1860

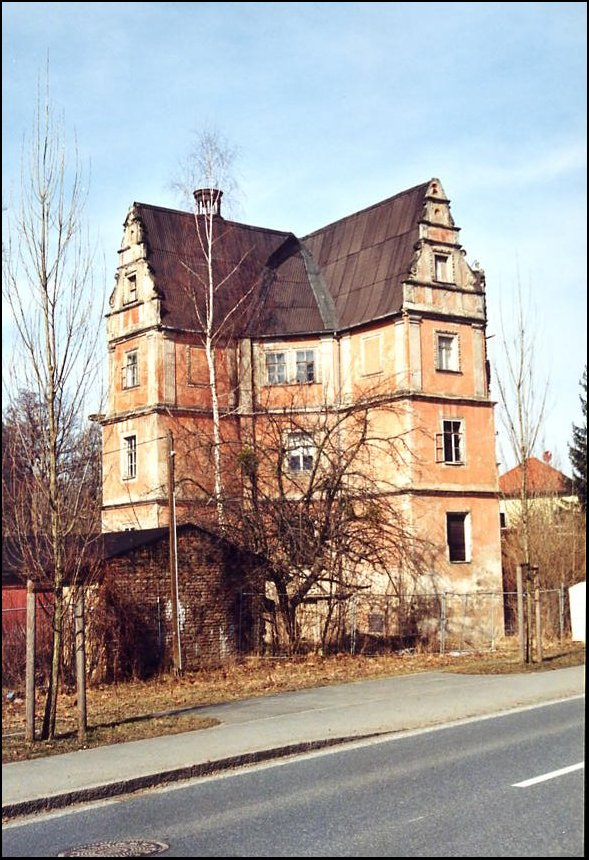
Rottwerndorf castle 2006
