= Krietzschwitz =

Village in Germany

Coordinates: 50°55′35″N 13°58′50″E

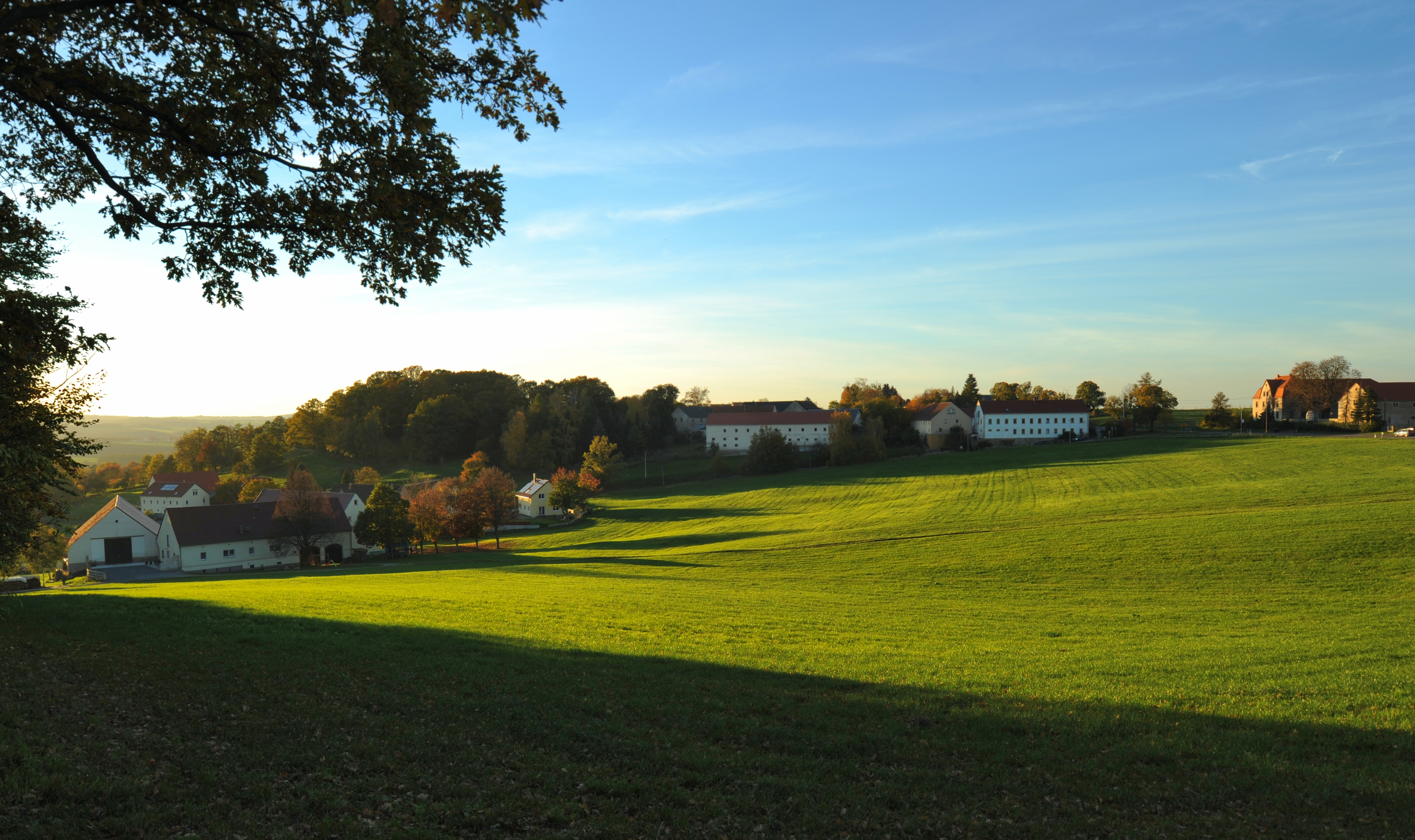
Krietzschwitz village, Free State of Saxony, Germany

Krietzschwitz is a village in the municipality of Pirna, in Saxony, Germany. It was incorporated into Pirna in 1974. The place was mentioned for the first time in 1359. It is situated on Bundesstraße 172, 5 km southeast of Pirna town centre.
