= Neundorf (Pirna) =

Coordinates: 50°55′03″N 13°58′42″E

Neundorf (German pronunciation: [ˈnɔʏndɔʁf]) is a subdivision of Pirna, Germany. It was incorporated into Pirna in 1923. It was first mentioned in 1408 when it was initially known as Poondorf. It is situated in the valley of the river Gottleuba, 6 km southeast of Pirna town centre.

Neundorf had a small island station on the Gottleuba Valley Railway, but the line was closed in 1976.
