= Niedervogelgesang =

German village

Coordinates: 50°57′07″N 13°58′58″E

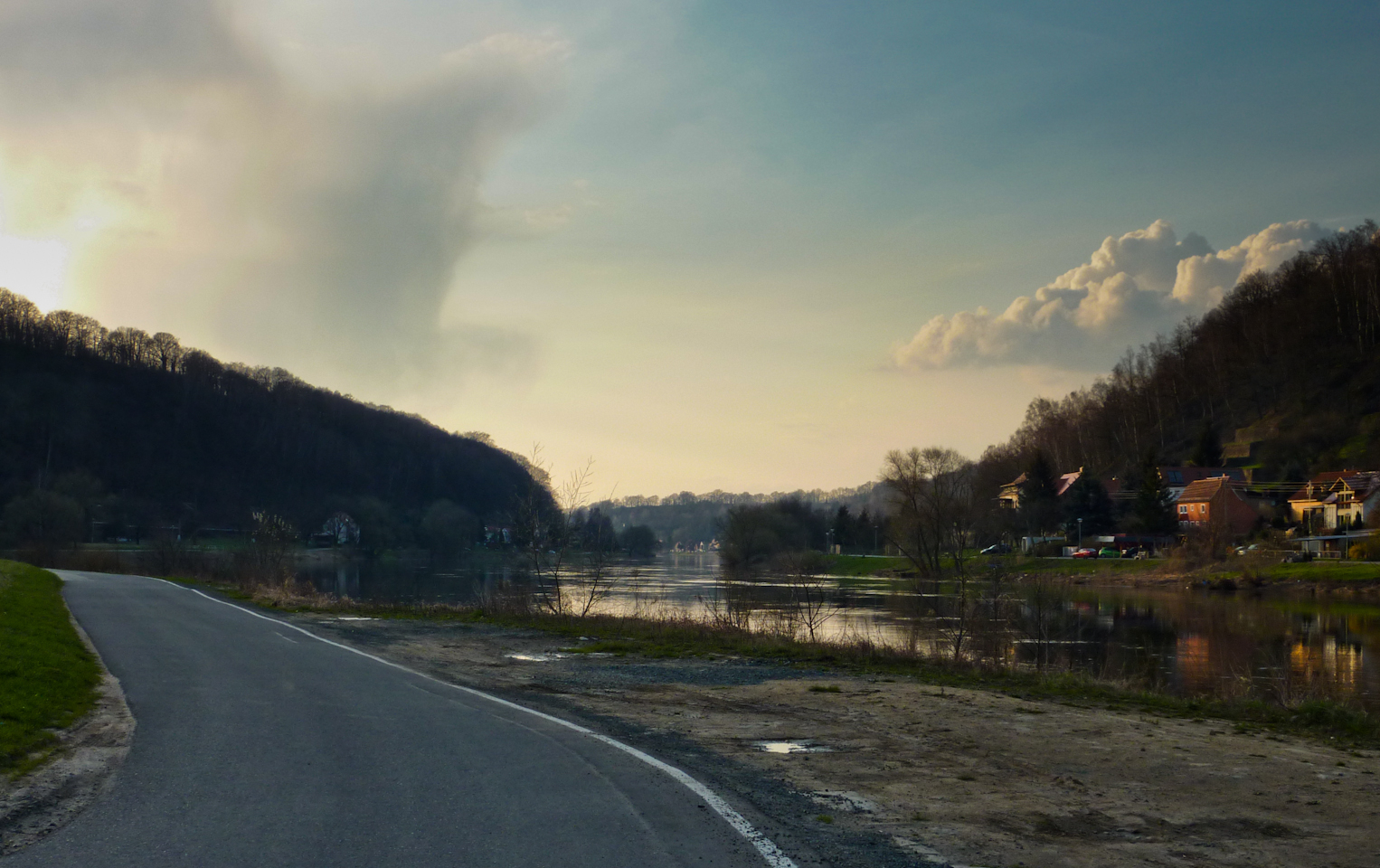
An image of Niedervogelgesang

Niedervogelgesang is a village in the municipality of Pirna, in Saxony, Germany. It was incorporated into Pirna in 1923. The place was mentioned for the first time in 1551. It is situated on the left bank of the river Elbe, 3 km east of Pirna town centre. Its name translates as "lower bird song."
