= Copitz =

Coordinates: 50°58′10″N 13°55′58″E

Copitz is a subdivision of Pirna, in Saxony, Germany. It was incorporated into Pirna in 1923. The place was mentioned for the first time in 1417. It is situated on the right bank of the river Elbe, directly opposite Pirna town centre.
