= Frank Peschel =

German politician (born 1974)

Member of the Landtag of Saxony
- Incumbent
- Assumed office 1 October 2019
- Preceded by: Patricia Wissel
- Constituency: Bautzen 1

Personal details
- Born: 1974 (age 51–52) Pirna
- Party: Alternative for Germany (since 2014)
- Other political affiliations: Christian Democratic Union (2007–2011)

Frank Peschel (born 1974 in Pirna) is a German politician serving as a member of the Landtag of Saxony since 2019. From 2018 to 2019, he served as press secretary of the Alternative for Germany group in the Landtag.
