= Ute Trekel-Burckhardt =

German operatic mezzo-soprano

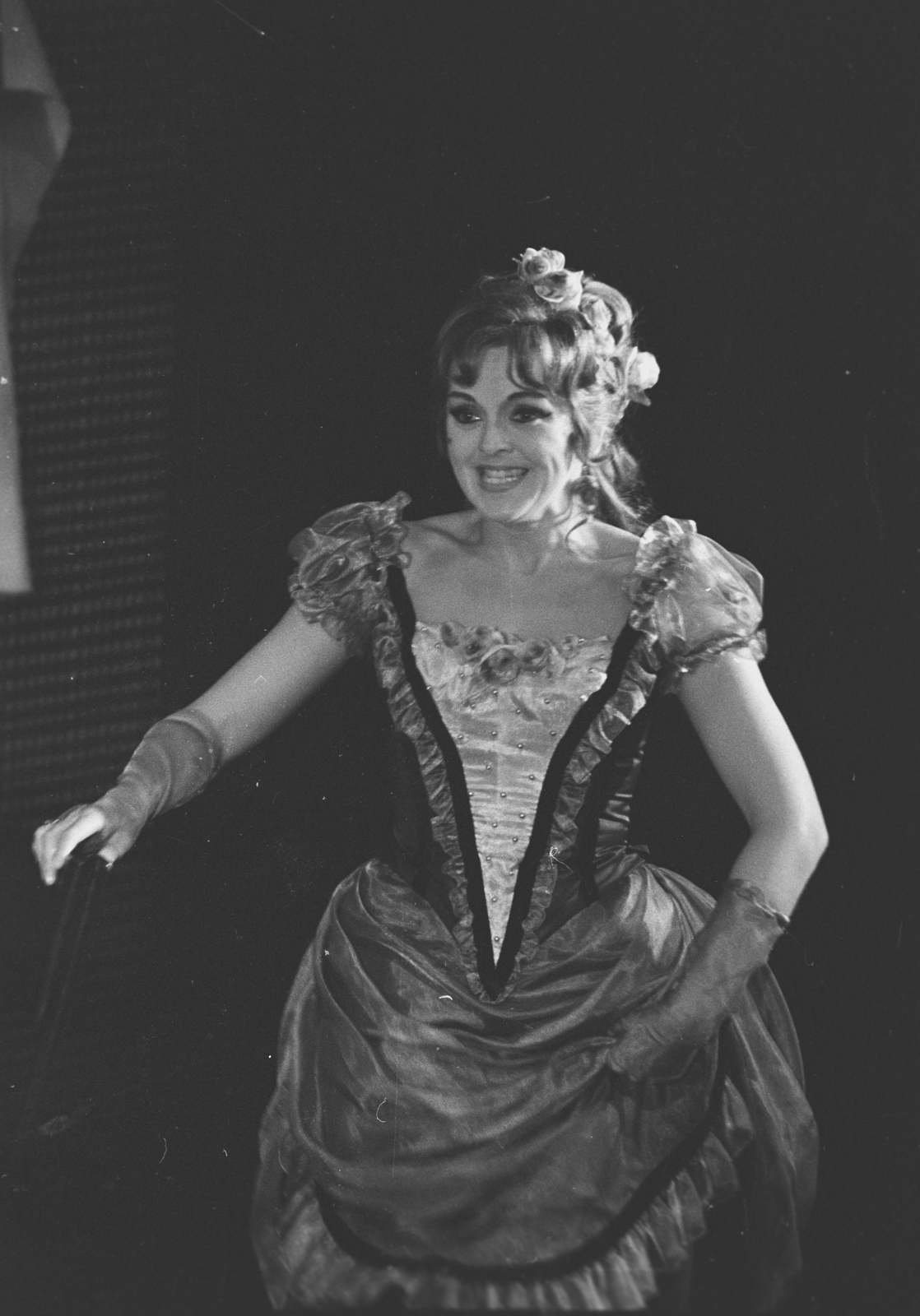
- Trekel-Burckhardt in Die Fledermaus, Berlin, 1968
- Born: 3 November 1939 (age 86); Pirna, Germany
- Education: Hochschule für Musik "Hanns Eisler"
- Occupations: Operatic mezzo-soprano; Operatic contralto
- Organizations: Staatsoper Unter den Linden (later: Berlin State Opera)

Ute Trekel-Burckhardt (born 3 November 1939) is a German operatic mezzo-soprano. She was a long-time lead soloist of the Staatsoper Unter den Linden in East Berlin (later: Berlin State Opera). She took part in world premieres such as Noch einen Löffel Gift, Liebling? by Siegfried Matthus and Heinrich Sutermeister's Le Roi Bérenger. Even before the fall of the Berlin Wall, she appeared internationally, including the Vienna State Opera in her signature role, the tile role of Der Rosenkavalier, and at Opéra de Nancy in Schönberg's Erwartung.

== Life and career ==
Born in Pirna, Trekel-Burckhardt studied at the Hochschule für Musik "Hanns Eisler" with Rita Meinl-Weise. She made her stage debut in 1963 at the Komische Oper Berlin as Page in Salome by Richard Strauss in a production by Götz Friedrich. In 1972, she participated in the world premiere of Noch einen Löffel Gift, Liebling? by Siegfried Matthus to a libretto by Peter Hacks. In 1975 she became a member of the ensemble of the Staatsoper Unter den Linden and also worked as a guest at the Staatsoper Dresden.

Trekel-Burckhardt interpreted all the great mezzo-soprano and contralto roles of the repertoire. One of her signature roles was Octavian in Der Rosenkavalier by Richard Strauss. She also appeared in the title role of Bizet's Carmen, as Amneris in Verdi's Aida and Eboli in Don Carlo. She performed as Sesto in Mozart's La clemenza di Tito.

Before the fall of the Berlin Wall already, she appeared as a guest at the Vienna State Opera as Octavian, and at the Bavarian State Opera in Munich as Sesto. She performed at the Copenhagen Opera House, the Cologne Opera and the Oper Bonn where she appeared as Renata in Prokofiev's Der feurige Engel in 1984. She performed in Schönberg's monodrama Erwartung at the Opéra de Nancy in 1985, as Kundry in Wagner's Parsifal at Badisches Staatstheater Karlsruhe in 1987, and as Ortrud in Wagner's Lohengrin at the Hessisches Staatstheater Wiesbaden in 1988.

In 1985, she took part in the world premiere of Heinrich Sutermeister's Le Roi Bérenger. In 1986, she appeared in the guest performance of the Berlin State Opera at the festival of Las Palmas as Venus in Wagner's Tannhäuser.

In 1990, she appeared at the Berlin State Opera as Azucena in Verdi's Il trovatore, as Amneris and as the Composer in Ariadne auf Naxos by Richard Strauss. In 1991, she performed at the Deutsche Oper Berlin in Götz Friedrich's production of Lohengrin as Ortrud. She appeared at the State Opera as the Küsterin in Jenufa in 1993, and as Klytämnestra in Elektra by Richard Strauss at the Opernhaus Graz in 1995.

Trekel-Burckhardt is married to the bass Jürgen Trekel. Their son is the baritone Roman Trekel.
