= Zuschendorf =

Village in Germany

Coordinates: 50°55′59″N 13°54′52″E

Zuschendorf is a village in the municipality of Pirna in the Sächsische Schweiz-Osterzgebirge district of Saxony, Germany. It was incorporated into Pirna in 1923. The place was mentioned for the first time in 1378. It lies in the valley of the river Seidewitz, 4 km southwest of Pirna town centre, on the road to Liebstadt.

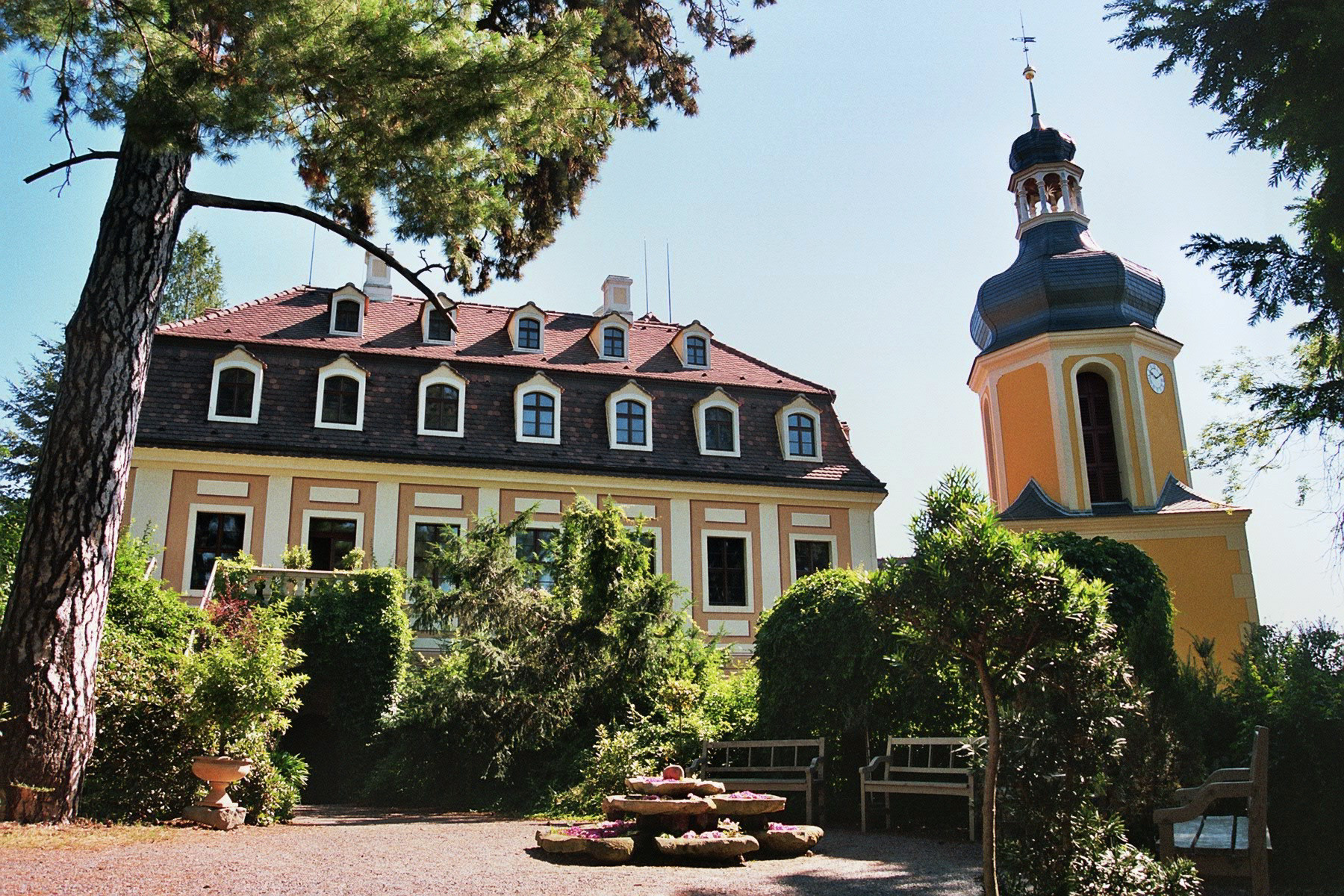
Zuschendorf castle.

In 1553, a castle was built there, where the von Carlowitz and von Bünau families lived for many years. The baroque-style church was built in 1560 and has been a part of the castle since the Thirty Years' War. During the Communist years of East Germany, an antique dealer occupied the castle. After the fall of the Berlin Wall, the rundown castle that should have been torn down was spared. The premises have been cleaned and now have a garden of hortensia, bonsai, ivy and camellia.
