= Petrus Albinus =

German professor (1543–1598)

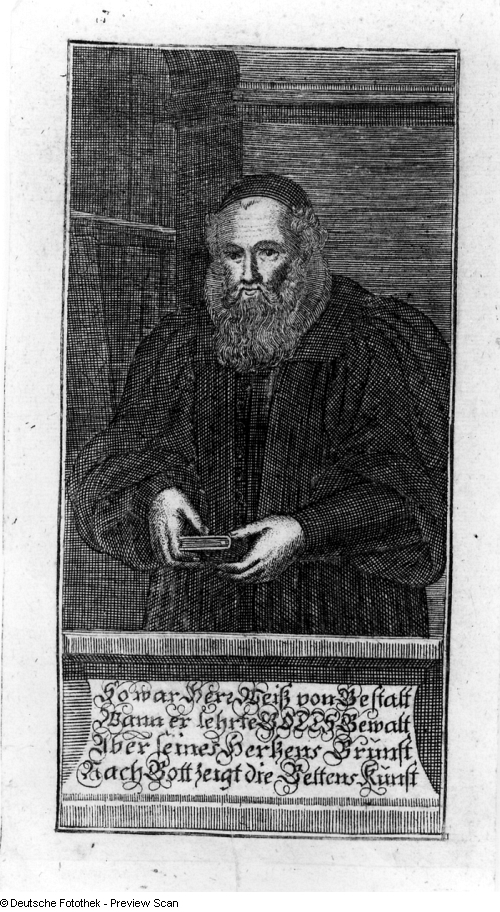
Petrus Albinus

Petrus Albinus (German name: Peter von Weiße; 1543–1598) was a professor at Wittenberg in Germany and is known as the father of Saxon historiography.

== Life ==
Petrus Albinus was born on 18 June 1543 in Schneeberg in the Ore Mountains of central Europe. His father was Peter Weis, who built the Hospital Church in Schneeberg. He was married to Magdalena Hübsch, daughter of a Ratskämmerer and mining entrepreneur, who had moved to Schneeberg from Nuremberg. In keeping with the common practice of the day he Latinized his name to Petrus Albinus. After attending grammar school in Schneeberg and princely school at Meissen, Albinus studied in Leipzig, received his bachelor's degree in 1553 and worked in Lauban. In 1559 he moved to the University of Viadrina in Frankfurt/Oder, and in 1564 the Leucorea in Wittenberg. He focused mainly on legal and historical research.

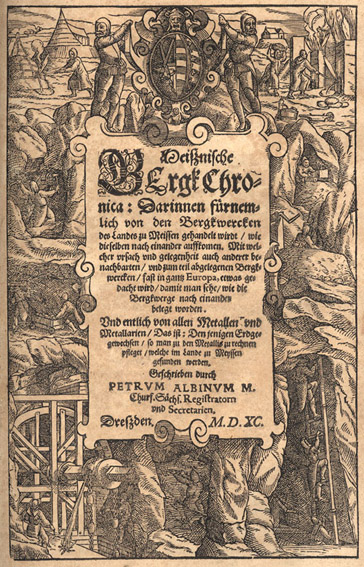
Title page of Meißnischen Bergk-Chronica, 1590

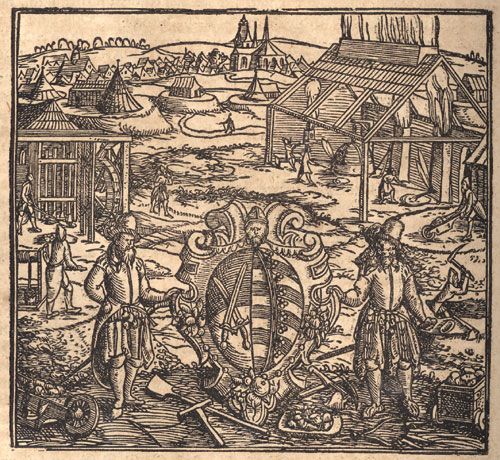
Illustration from the Meißnischen Bergk-Chronica, 1590

In Wittenberg he took over the task of completing the history of Upper Saxony and the House of Wettin begun by Georg Fabricius. For example, in 1579, he indexed the letters and documents of the Bishopric of Meissen. From 1579 to 1588 he was a dean of the University of Wittenberg; in 1586 he took over as Rector and worked until 1588 in Wittenberg. In 1588, Albinus was called to Dresden to be appointed as secretary to Prince-Elector Christian I of Saxony, where he took oversight of all the documents of the Saxon royal house.

During his time at Wittenberg, he wrote, in manuscript, a history of his native town of Schneeberg; parts of it were printed as the Chronicle of the Meissen Region and Mountains (Meißnische Land- und Bergchronik, 1580–89), but some parts remained unfinished. Other chronicles were left by him as manuscripts in the archives, for example, those of Altzelle Annaberg, Crimmitschau and Torgau. Several volumes of unpublished collections are preserved in the Dresden Library.

Although his research does not meet current scientific standards, his works qualify him as the father of Saxon local history, local history research and historiography. Albinus was married twice. First, in 1576 to Ludmilla Fritsch and, later, in 1584 to Magdalena, a daughter of Samuel Selfisch, with whom he had eight children.

He died on 31 July 1598 in Dresden.

== Works ==
- Commentarius novus de Mysnia, Oder Newe Meysnische Chronica, 1580, 1589/90 under the title: Meißnische Land- u. Berg-Chronica (Part 2 under the title: Meißnerische Bergk Chronik, 1590), 1610: Novae Saxonum historiae progymnasmata. . " 1585;
- New Stammbuch u. Beschreibung d. uhralten kurfiirstl.... Hauses zu Sachsen ..., continued by M. Dresser, 1602; s. n. L. Bönhoff, P. A.,
- Annabergische Annales de anno 1492 biss 1539, with publication of the oldest news about Annaberg based on d. Ms. Q 127 by the Royal Public Library of Dresden. in: Mitteilungen des Vereins für Geschichte von Annaberg 11, 1810. pp. 1–50.

== Literature ==
- Franz Schnorr von Carolsfeld (1875). "Albinus, Petrus". Allgemeine Deutsche Biographie (in German). Vol. 1. Leipzig: Duncker & Humblot. p. 223.
- Bruno Sauer (1953). "Albinus Petrus". Neue Deutsche Biographie (in German). Vol. 1. Berlin: Duncker & Humblot. p. 151. (full text online).
- Reinhardt Eigenwill: Albinus (real name: Weiß, Weis), Petrus (Peter). In: Sächsische Biografie. Published by the Institute for Saxon History and Folk Art, revised by Martina Schattkowsky.
- Manfred Bachmann (ed.): Petrus Albinus - Begründer der erzgebirgischen Geschichtsschreibung. In: Kleine Chronik großer Meister - Erzgebirger, auf die wir stolz sind. Part 1, Druckerei und Verlag Mike Rockstroh, Aue, 2000, pp. 85–87
