= Gottleuba Valley railway =

Railway line in Germany

Pirna–Gottleuba
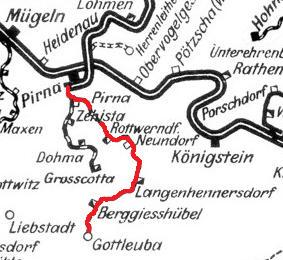
- Section of the 1902 Saxon rail map

Overview
- Line number: 6603; Saxon PGl

Service
- Route number: 313 (1971)

Technical
- Line length: 17.610 km (Line class: CM4 (1999))
- Track gauge: 1,435 mm
- Minimum radius: 180 m
- Maximum incline: 2.7 %

The Gottleuba Valley railway (German: Gottleubatalbahn) was the second railway line to be built in Saxony as a Sekundärbahn. It ran along the Gottleuba valley from Pirna via Berggießhübel to Bad Gottleuba and was closed in 1976.

== Sources ==
- Moritz Fischer: Wanderungen durch das Gottleubatal. Verlag Friedrich Axt. Dresden 1881.
- Rainer Fischer: Pirna – Gottleuba und Pirna – Großcotta. in: Wolf-Dieter Machel (Hrsg.): Neben- und Schmalspurbahnen in Deutschland. GeraNova Zeitschriftenverlag. München 1996.
- Rainer Fischer: Sekundärbahnen von Pirna nach Großcotta und Gottleuba. Verlag Kenning. Nordhorn 1998, ISBN 3-927587-38-9.
- Tobias Nitsche, Jens Herbach: 100 Jahre Eisenbahn Pirna – Gottleuba. Dresden 2005. (Eigenverlag)
- Erich Preuß, Rainer Preuß: Sächsische Staatseisenbahnen. transpress Verlagsgesellschaft mbH. Berlin 1991.
