= Seidewitz =

River in Germany

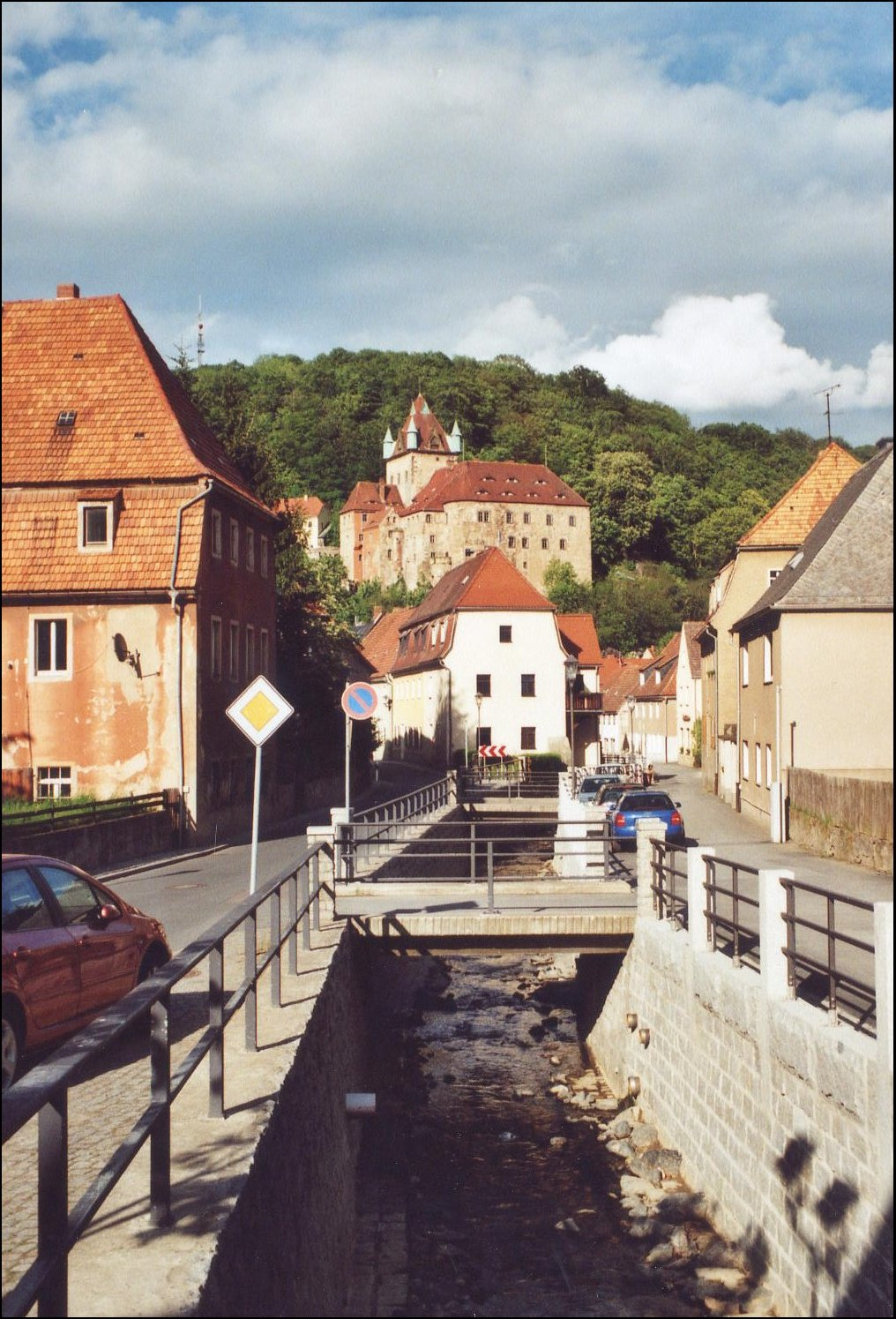
- The Seidewitz in Liebstadt

Location
- Country: Germany
- State: Saxony

Physical characteristics
- Source
  - location: Eastern Ore Mountains
- Mouth
  - location: Gottleuba
  - coordinates: 50.9545°N 13.9373°E

Basin features
- Progression: Gottleuba→ Elbe→ North Sea

The Seidewitz (German pronunciation: [ˈzaɪdəvɪts]) is a river of Saxony, Germany. It is a left tributary of the Gottleuba, into which it flows in the town Pirna. Its source is in the Eastern Ore Mountains, near the village Breitenau. It flows through the town Liebstadt. Its length is about 25 km (16 mi).

== See also ==
- List of rivers of Saxony
