= Grillenburg Sandstone =

Part of the Elbe Sandstones of central Europe

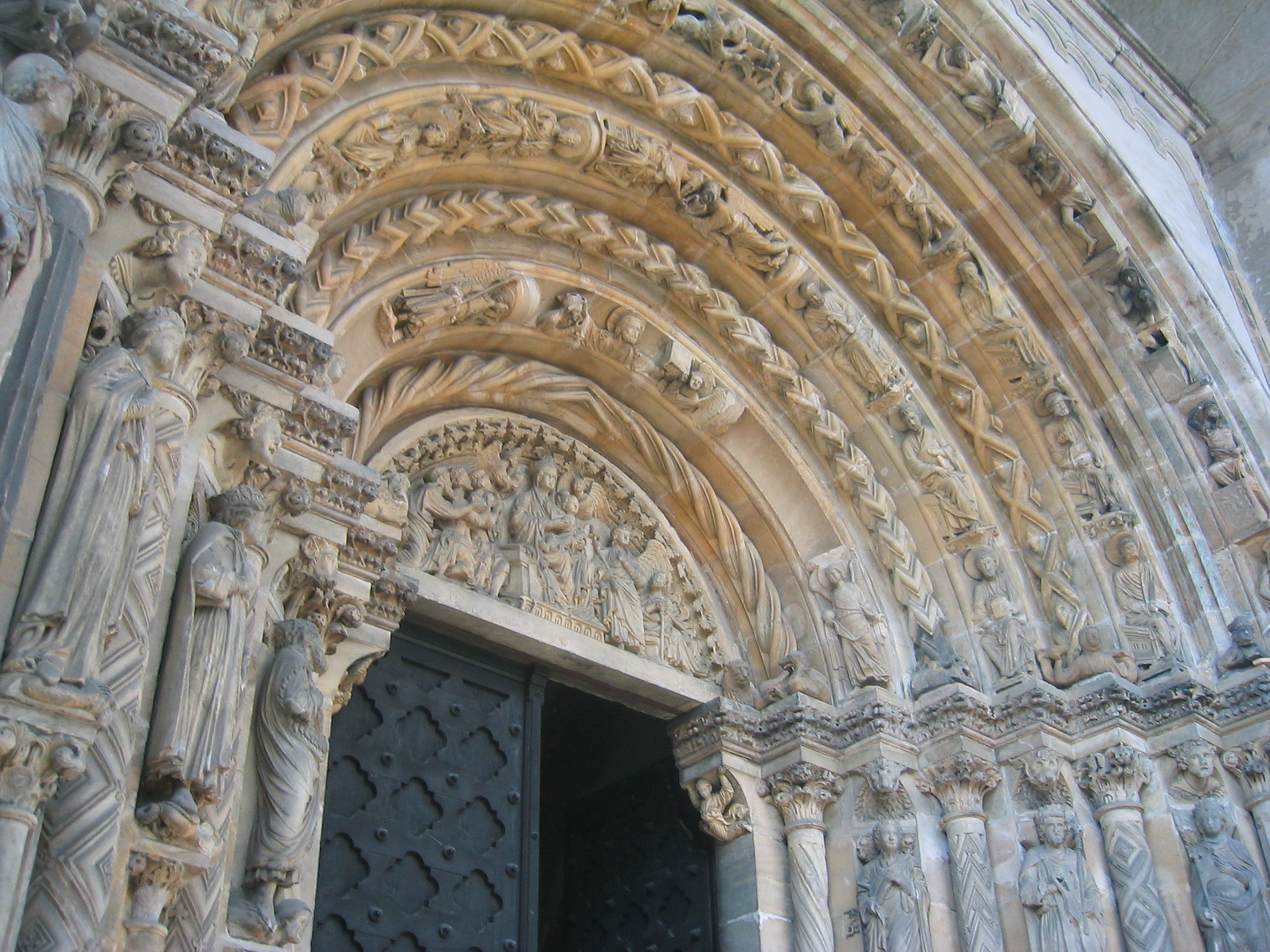
Golden Gate of Freiberg Cathedral made of Grillenburg Sandstone

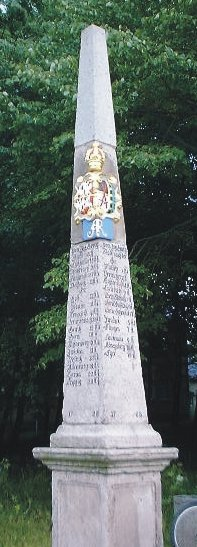
The coat of arms of the Saxon postal milepost in Johanngeorgenstadt is made of Niederschöna Sandstone

Grillenburg Sandstone (German: Grillenburger Sandstein) and Niederschöna Sandstone (Niederschönaer Sandstein) belong to the Elbe Sandstones of central Europe. There used to be a number of sandstone quarries in the Tharandt Forest and its neighbourhood, not far from Höckendorf (Paulsdorf Heath) and Ruppendorf, near Grillenburg, Niederschöna and Hetzdorf in the state of Saxony. These Cretaceous sandstones emerged in the Cenomanian and Turonian ages. The aforementioned quarries have long since closed.

== Description and use ==
This sandstone is both fine- and coarse-grained; its colour ranging from white to brown; in addition to quartz and mica, numerous plant impressions of the genus Credneria are found in it.

According to sedimentological investigations and historical research, the material for the Golden Gate of Freiberg Cathedral came from the "ashlar stratum" (Werksteinbank) in the area of Grillenburg. The coat of arms of the electoral Saxon postal milepost in Johanngeorgenstadt was cut from Niederschöna Sandstone and the three Freiberg postal milestones were made of Hetzdorf Sandstone.

== See also ==
- List of sandstones
- Cotta Sandstone
- Posta Sandstone
- Reinhardtsdorf Sandstone

== Sources ==
- W. Dienemann und O. Burre: Die nutzbaren Gesteine Deutschlands und ihre Lagerstätten mit Ausnahme der Kohlen, Erze und Salze. Enke-Verlag, Stuttgart 1929, p. 302.
- Forschungsgruppe Kursächsische Postmeilensäulen (publ.): Lexikon Kursächsische Postmeilensäulen, transpress-Verlag, Berlin 1989, ISBN 3-344-00264-3
