= List of sandstones =

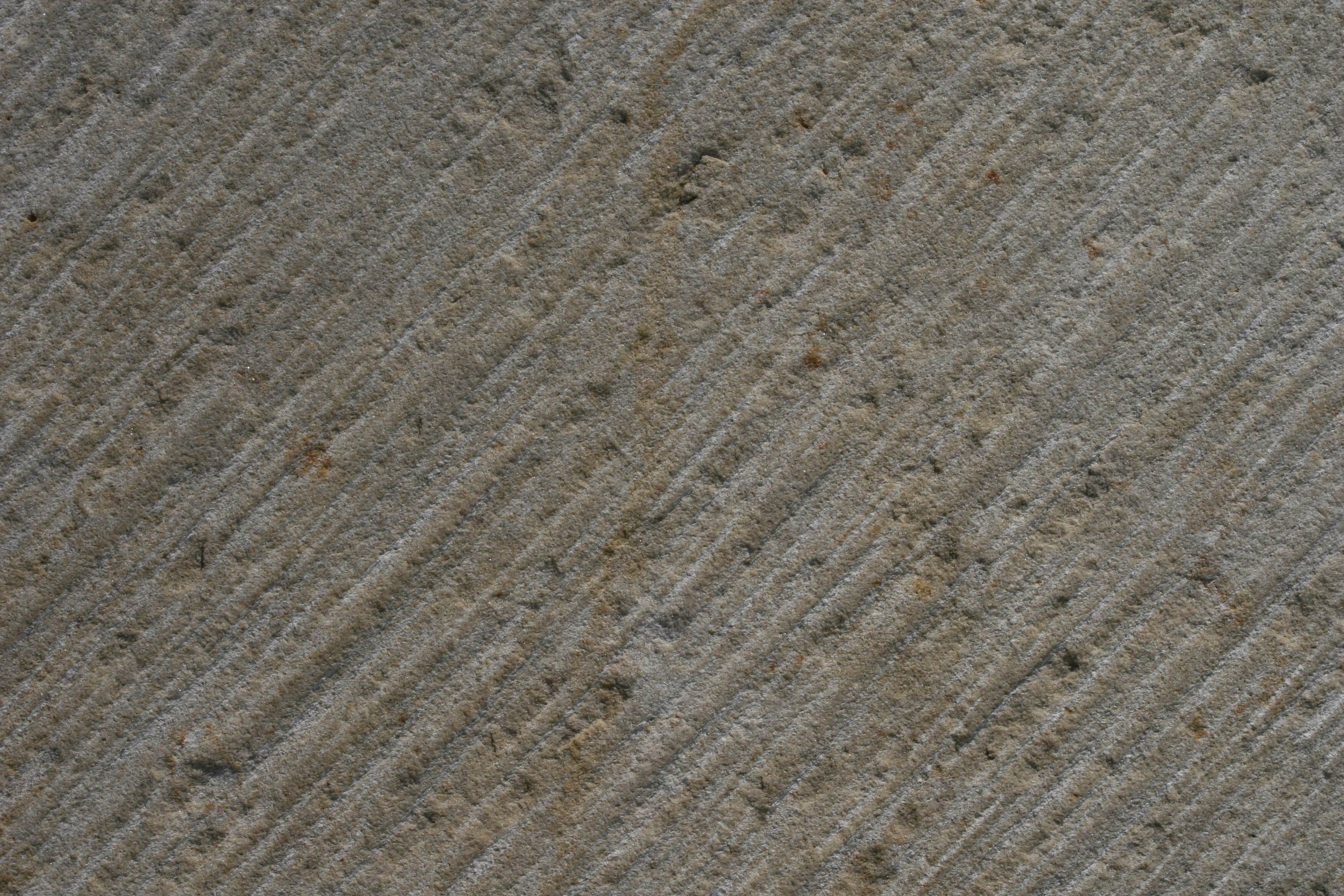
Obernkirchen Sandstone

This is a list of types of sandstone that have been or are used economically as natural stone for building and other commercial or artistic purposes.

== Trans-regional ==
(across state borders)

- Cornbrash Sandstone: North Rhine-Westphalia, Lower Saxony
- Elbe Sandstone: Germany (Saxony) and the Czech Republic
- Red Main Sandstone: Hesse, Baden-Württemberg, Bavaria
- Wealden Sandstone: Lower Saxony, North Rhine-Westphalia

== Australia ==
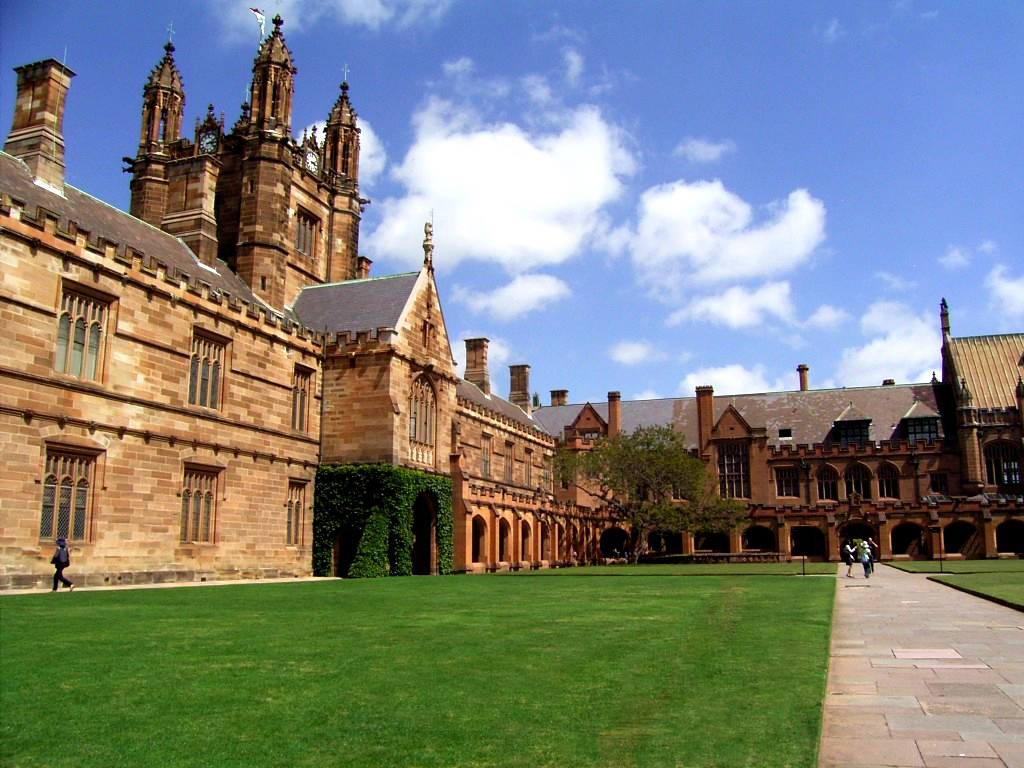
University of Sydney built from Hawkesbury Sandstone

- Hawkesbury Sandstone: Sydney Basin, Gosford
- Helidon Sandstone: Helidon and Murphys Creek

== Belgium ==
- Balegem Sandstone: Balegem in Oosterzele
- Ledian Sandstone: Lede
- Gobertange Sandstone: Gobertange in Jodoigne

== Canada ==
- Nepean Sandstone: Ottawa, Ontario
- Paskapoo Sandstone: Calgary, Alberta

== Czech Republic ==
- Božanov Sandstone: near Božanov
- Niedergrund Sandstone: near Dolní Žleb
- Libná Sandstone: near Libná
- Zdoňov Sandstone: near Zdoňov
- Mšené Sandstone; near Mšené-lázně
- Podhorní Sandstone: near Podhorní Újezd
- Těšínský Sandstone: near Řeka

== Denmark ==
- Nexø Sandstone (also Neksø Sandstone): near Nexø on Bornholm

== Estonia ==
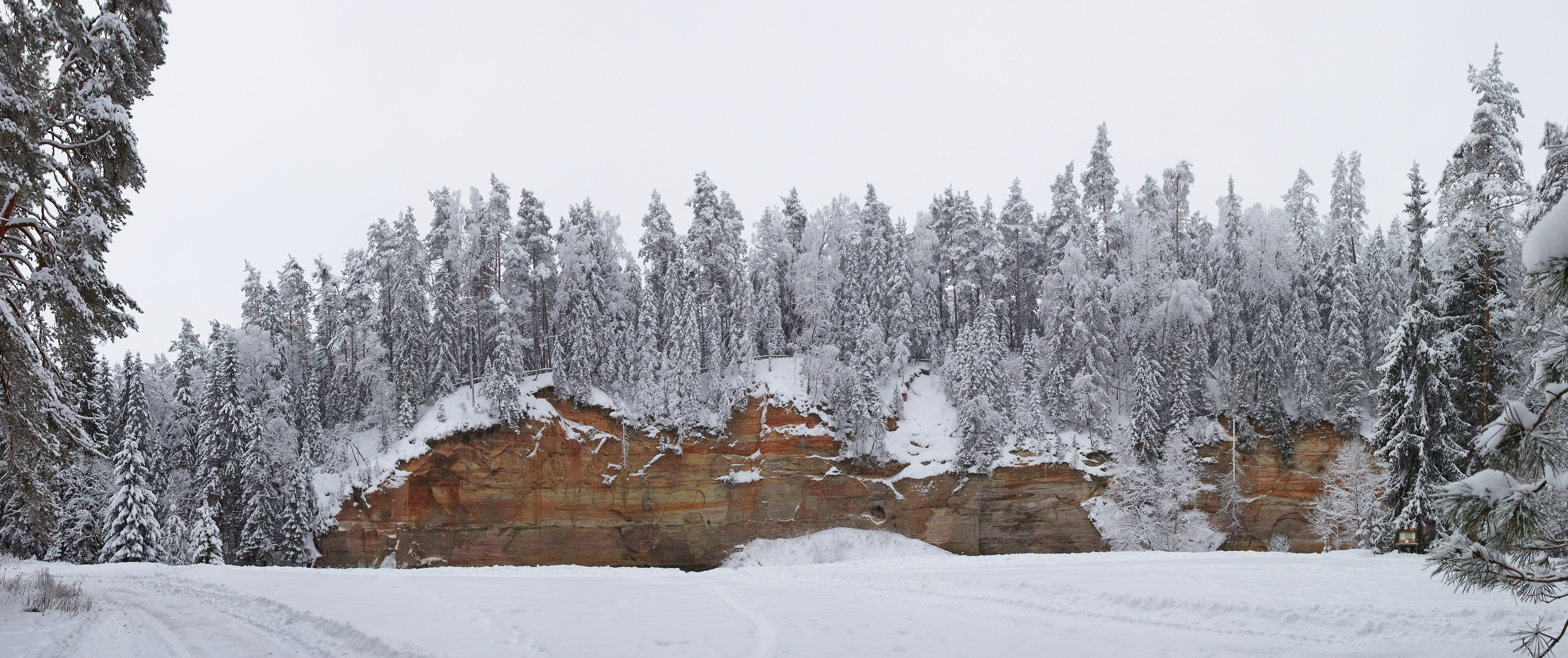
Devonian Sandstone at Suur Taevaskoda, Põlva County, Estonia

- Devonian Sandstone at Suur Taevaskoda, Põlva County

== France ==
- Avessac: near Redon
- Belleau: near Château-Thierry
- Bigarré des Vosges: in the Vosges
- Blavozy: near Puy-en-Velay
- Champenay: near Saint-Dié
- Erquy: near Saint-Brieuc
- Fontainebleau: near Fontainebleau
- Frain: in the Vosges
- La Rhune: near Bayonne
- Moliere: near Rodez
- Najac: near Villefranche-de-Rouergue
- Omonville: near Omonville-la-Rogue
- Rothbach: in the Vosges

== Germany ==
=== Bavaria ===
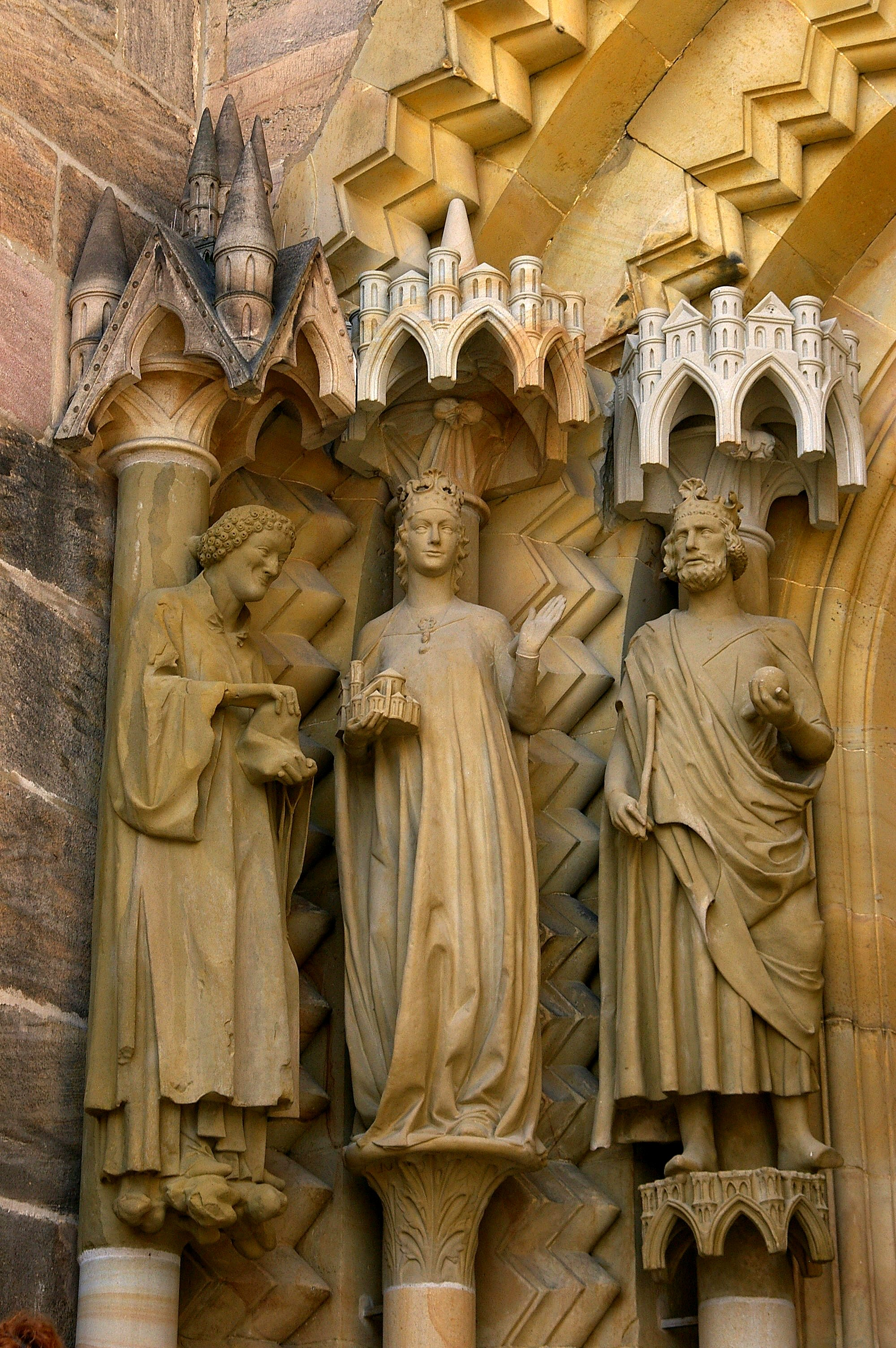
Adams Gate at Bamberg Cathedral, made of Burgpreppach Sandstone

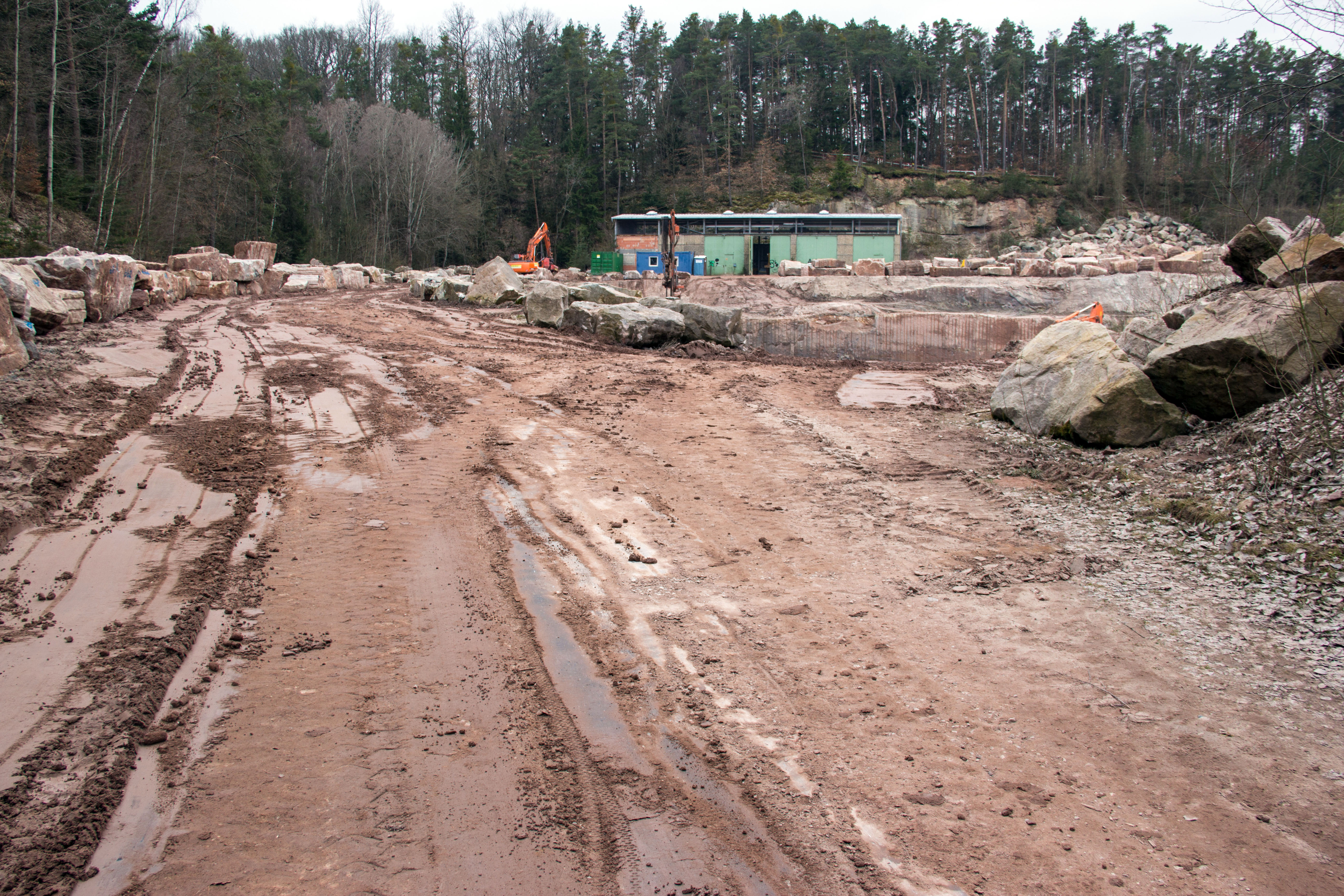
Quarry in Worzeldorf (Nuremberg)

- Abtswind Sandstone: on the Friedrichsberg near Abtswind
- Burgpreppach Sandstone: Burgpreppach
- Gnodstadt Sandstone: Gnodstadt near Ochsenfurt
- Ihrlerstein Green Sandstone: Ihrlerstein near Kelheim
- Sand Sandstone: Sand am Main
- Trebgast Sandstone: Trebgast
- Worzeldorf Sandstone: Worzeldorf near Nuremberg

=== Baden-Württemberg ===
- Dettenhausen Sandstone: was formerly quarried in the Schönbuch
- Donzdorf Sandstone: near Donzdorf
- Freudenstädt Sandstone: near Freudenstadt
- Heilbronn Sandstone: near Heilbronn
- Lossburg Sandstone: Lossburg
- Maulbronn Sandstone: near Maulbronn
- Nöttingen Sandstone: near Nöttingen
- Neckar Valley Sandstone: Mosbach near Heidelberg
- Pfrondorf Sandstone: Pfrondorf
- Pliezhausen Sandstone: near Pliezhausen
- Weil Sandstone: Weiler near Sinsheim

=== Hessen ===
- Cornberg Sandstone: near Cornberg
- Friedewald Sandstone: near Friedewald
- Odenwald Sandstone: near Beerfelden

=== Lower Saxony ===
- Bentheim and Gildehaus Sandstone: Bad Bentheim
- Deister Sandstone: Völksen
- Hils Sandstone: Lutter am Barenberge
- Nesselberg Sandstone: Altenhagen I
- Obernkirchen Sandstone: Obernkirchen
- Osterwald Sandstone: Osterwald
- Piesberg Sandstone: Osnabrück
- Süntel Sandstone: Pötzen
- Velpk Sandstone: Velpke
- Weser Sandstone: Bad Karlshafen and Arholzen

=== North Rhine-Westphalia ===
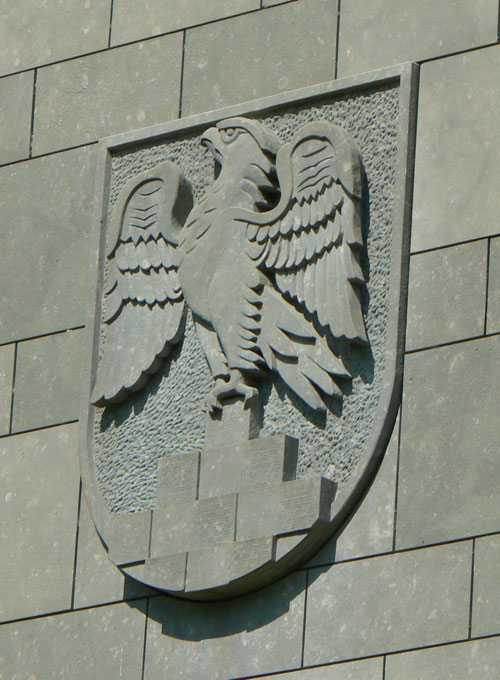
Coat of arms of the town of Anröchte made of Anröchte Stone

- Anröchte Stone: Anröchte
- Baumberge Sandstone: Baumberge
- Ibbenbüren Sandstone: Ibbenbüren
- Liedberg Sandstone: Liedberg
- Osning Sandstone: Teutoburg Forest
- Porta Sandstone: Porta Westfalica
- Planicosta Sandstone: Lemgo
- Rüthen Sandstone: Rüthen in the Sauerland
- Ruhr Sandstone: Ruhrtal from Fröndenberg to Mülheim
- Teutoburg Forest Sandstone: Teutoburg Forest
- Werl Green Sandstone: Werl

=== Rheinland-Pfalz ===
- Kordel Sandstone Kordel
- Leistadt Sandstone: Leistadt
- Neustadt-Haardt Sandstone: Neustadt an der Weinstraße
- Schweinstal Sandstone: Schopp
- Udelfangen Sandstone: Udelfangen
- Flonheim Sandstone: Flonheim
- Obersulzbach Sandstone: Obersulzbach

=== Saarland ===
- Britten Sandstone: near Britten

=== Saxony ===
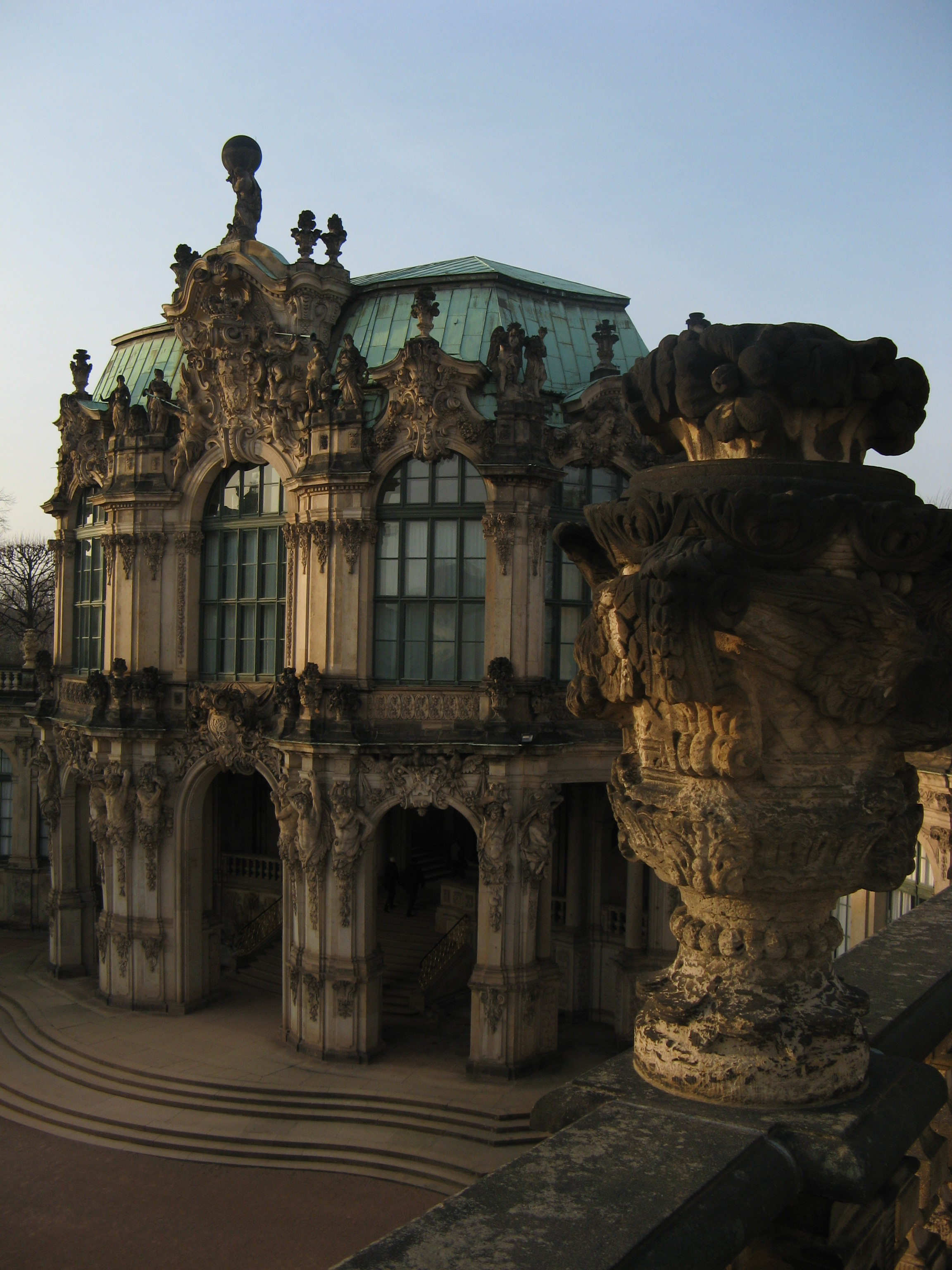
Dresden's Zwinger Palace, made of Cotta Sandstone

Elbe sandstones:

- Cotta Sandstone: Cotta near Pirna
- Grillenburg Sandstone: Grillenburg in the Tharandt Forest
- Niederschöna Sandstone: Niederschöna near Freiberg by the Tharandt Forest
- Posta Sandstone: Lohmen near Pirna
- Reinhardtsdorf Sandstone: Reinhardtsdorf-Schöna near Pirna
- Wehlen Sandstone: Stadt Wehlen near Pirna

=== Saxony-Anhalt ===
- Nebra Sandstone: Nebra
- Siebigerode Sandstone: Siebigerode
- Ummendorf Sandstone: Ummendorf

=== Thuringia ===
- Fambach Sandstone: near Schmalkalden
- Nebra Sandstone: Nebra
- Seeberg Sandstone: Seeberg near Gotha
- Tambach Sandstone: near Tambach-Dietharz
- Themar Sandstone: Themar

== Hungary ==
- Hárshegy Sandstone Formation: near Budapest

== India ==
- Yellow Sandstone: Jaisalmer, Rajasthan
- Chunar stone: near Chunar
- Pink Sandstone: from Rajasathan
- Jodhpur Sandstone
- Kandla Grey Sandstone: Bijoliya, Rajasthan.

== Israel/Palestine ==
- Kurkar

== Italy ==
- Pietra di Gorgoglione: near Matera
- Pietra Dorata: near Manciano
- Santafiora: Grosseto (see also Santa Fiora)

== Lesotho ==
- White City Sandstone, near Maseru

== Pakistan ==
- Khewra Sandstone: from Khewra Salt Mine, Punjab
- Yellow Sandstone: near Jhimpir, Karachi, Sindh
- Mango Sandstone: from Balochistan
- Teak Wood Sandstone: near Karachi, Sindh
- Buff/Grey Sandstone
- Sunset Sung Sandstone
- Imperial Red Sandstone

== Poland ==
- Silesian Sandstone, in Lower Silesia

== Spain ==
- Ronda Sandstone: Ronda, Málaga
- Villamayor Sandstone: Villamayor, Salamanca

== Sweden ==
- Burgsvik sandstone
- Gotland sandstone

== Switzerland ==
- Bäch Sandstone: by the Lake Zürich
- Bern Sandstone: quarry sites near Bern in Ostermundigen, Krauchthal and by the Gurten
- Bollingen Sandstone (also Buchberg Sandstone, Uznaberg Sandstone, Bollinger-Lehholz Sandstone and Güntliweid Sandstone): Rapperswil-Jona by the Upper Lake Zürich
- Grès à cailloux roulés: near Avenches
- Grès de Attalens: near Vevey
- Grès de Bulle: near Echarlens
- Grès de Corbières: near Echarlens
- Grès de Vaulruz: near Vaulruz
- Rorschach Sandstone: Rorschach
- St. Margreth Sandstone: St. Margrethen
- Teufen Sandstone: near Teufen

== South Africa ==
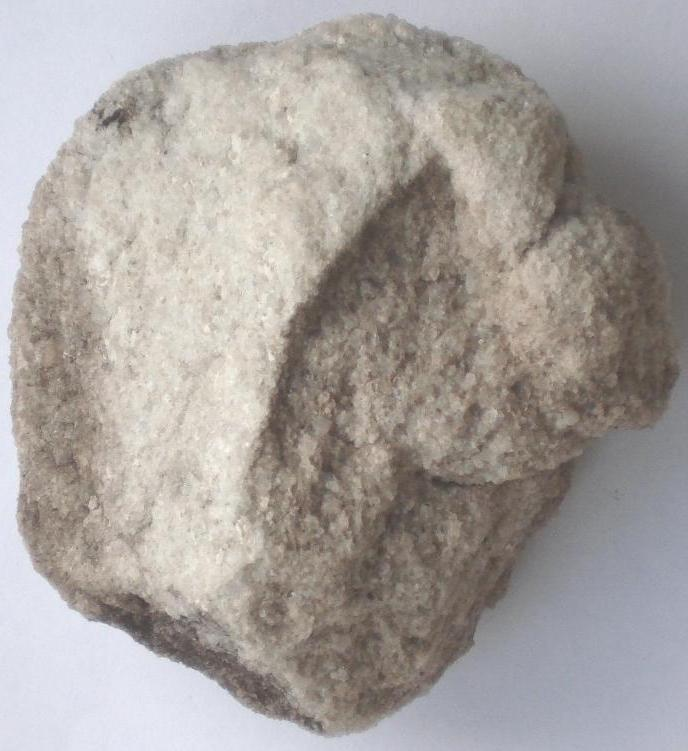
A piece of Table Mountain Sandstone

- Ermelo Sandstone, Mpumalanga province, near der Farm de Roodepoort
- Matatiele Sandstone, KwaZulu-Natal province, near Matatiele
- Naboomspruit (also Golden Dawn or Golden Stone) Limpopo province, around Warmbaths
- Nieuwoudtville Sandstone, Northern Cape province, near Nieuwoudtville
- Oudtshoorn Sandstone, Western Cape province, near Oudtshoorn
- Sandalwood (also Picturestone), Northern Cape province, near Vioolsdrif
- Steenpan (also Flatpan or Klippan), Free State province, near Wolvehoek
- Table Mountain Sandstone Western Cape province, various quarry sites
- numerous types, some without trade names, from the Karoo Supergroup in many quarries near Graaff-Reinet, Cradock, Queenstown, Aliwal North, Burgersdorp and Sterkstroom

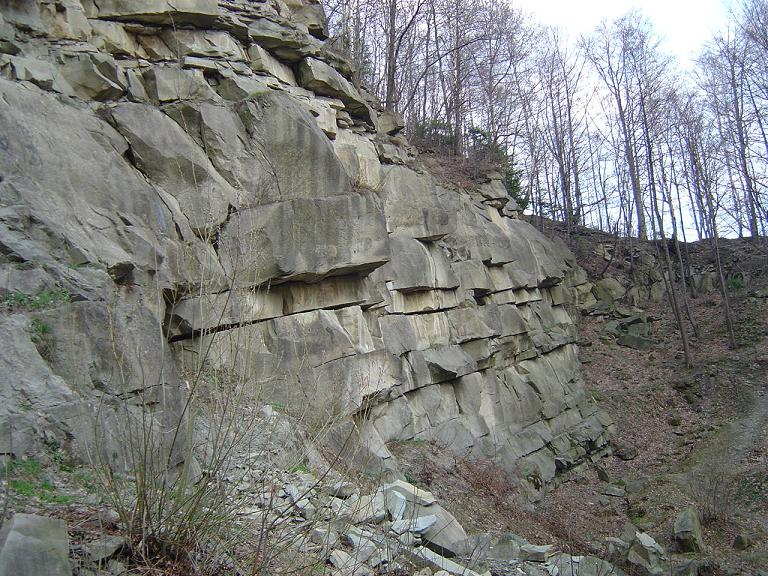
Těšínský sandstone quarry (Goulda Sandstone)

== United Kingdom ==
- Old Red Sandstone
- New Red Sandstone

=== England ===
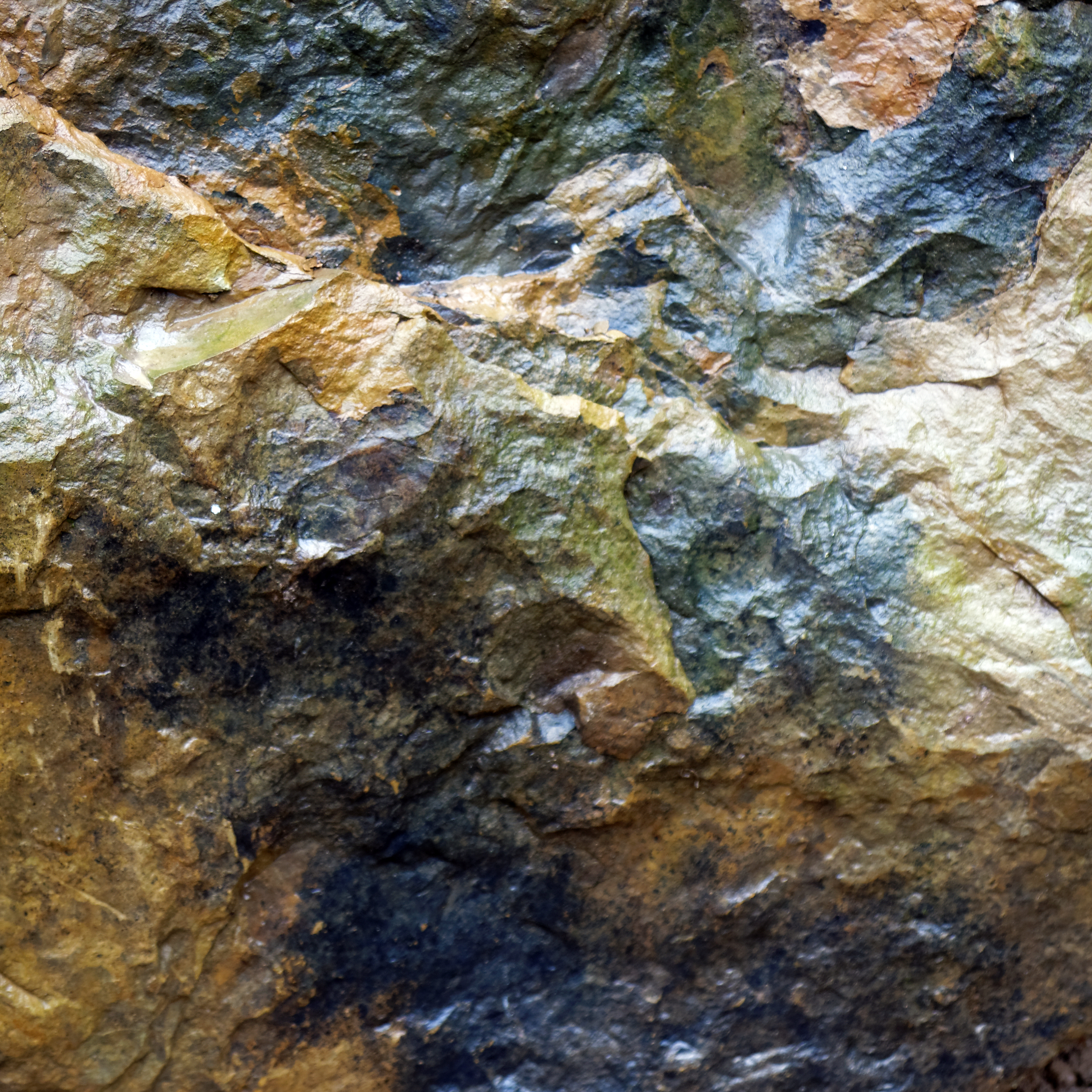
Horsham Stone

- Bargate stone: from Surrey
- Horsham Stone: from Sussex
- Millstone Grit: from Northern England
- Yorkstone: from Yorkshire

=== Scotland ===
- Locharbriggs Sandstone
- Craigleith Sandstone

=== Wales ===
- Pennant stone: from South Wales and Bristol area

== United States ==
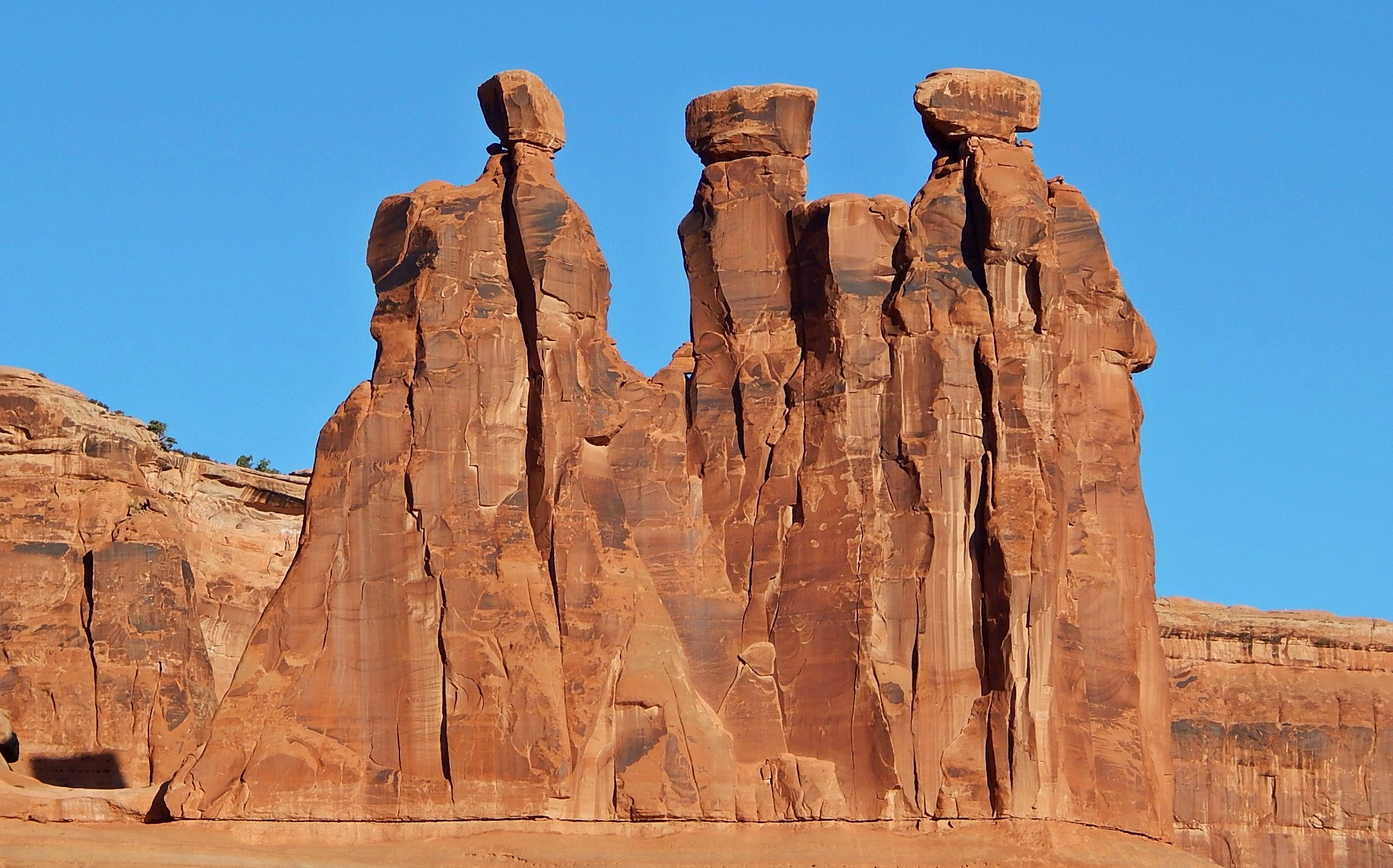
The Three Gossips tower in Arches National Park is Entrada Sandstone of the Colorado Plateau.

- Aquia Creek Sandstone: in Virginia
- Bayfield group: in northern Wisconsin
- Coconino Sandstone: in the Colorado Plateau
- Crab Orchard Sandstone: Cumberland Plateau, Tennessee
- Cutler Formation: in the Colorado Plateau
- Dakota Sandstone: in the Rocky Mountains and Great Plains
- Entrada Sandstone: in the Colorado Plateau
- Freda sandstone: in northern Michigan
- Guyandotte sandstone: in West Virginia
- Jacobsville sandstone: in northern Michigan
- Jordan Formation in the upper Midwest
- Medina sandstone extensive quarries in Western New York
- Monument Valley: Utah-Arizona state line
- Navajo Sandstone: in the Colorado Plateau
- Ohio Sandstone:
  - Berea Grit in Northeast Ohio, originally used for grindstones, later used to build the Federal Reserve Bank of New York
  - Ohio bluestone, also found in Northeast Ohio in certain streambeds and used as dimension stone
- Pennsylvania Bluestone in northeast Pennsylvania and adjoining parts of New Jersey and New York
- Stockton Sandstone: in western New Jersey along the Delaware River
- Potsdam Sandstone: in upstate New York
- Tapeats Sandstone: in Arizona (famously found in the Grand Canyon)
- Wingate Sandstone: in the Colorado Plateau
- Aqua Creek Sandstone: used to build the Whitehouse

== See also ==
- List of decorative stones
- List of types of limestone
- List of types of marble
