= Elbe Sandstone =

Type of sandstone found in Germany

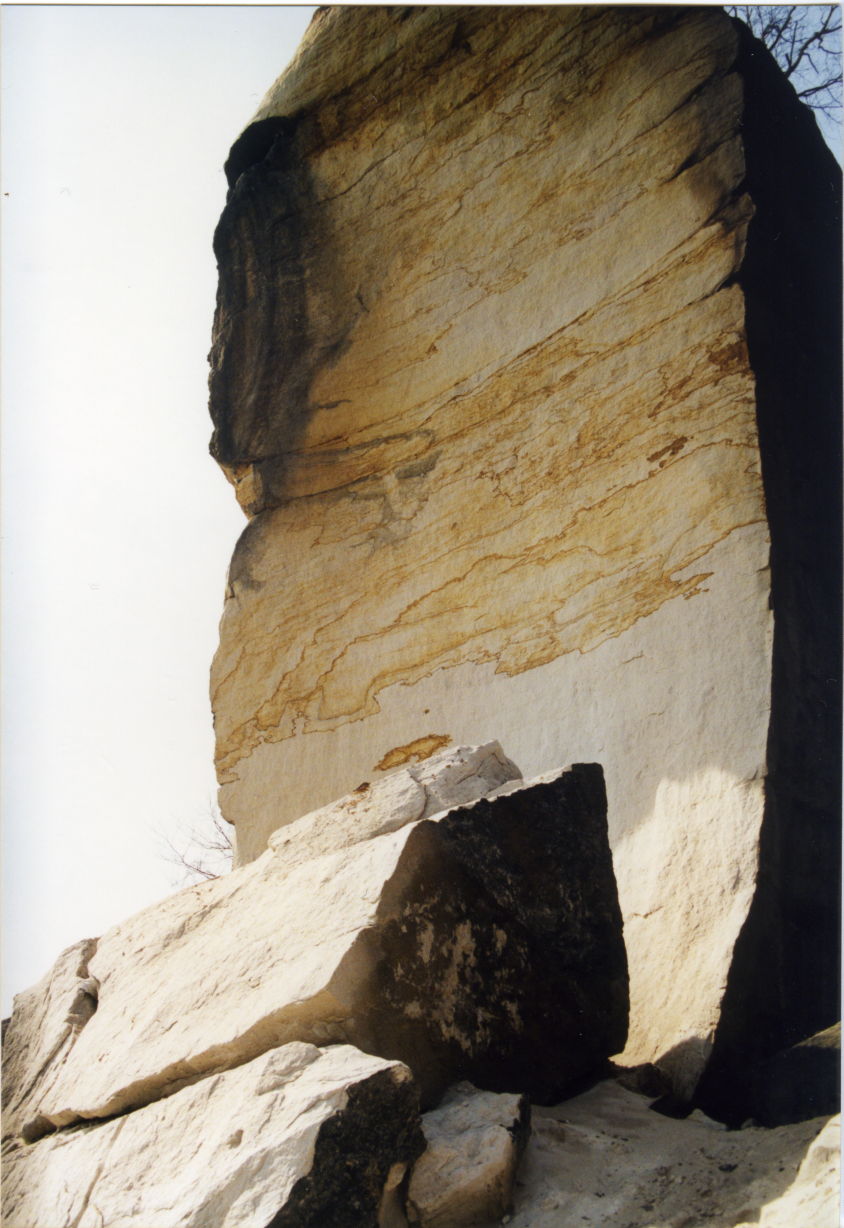
Elbe Sandstone, like here on the Wartturm where there has been a rockfall, can be permeated by a finely-divided "marbling".

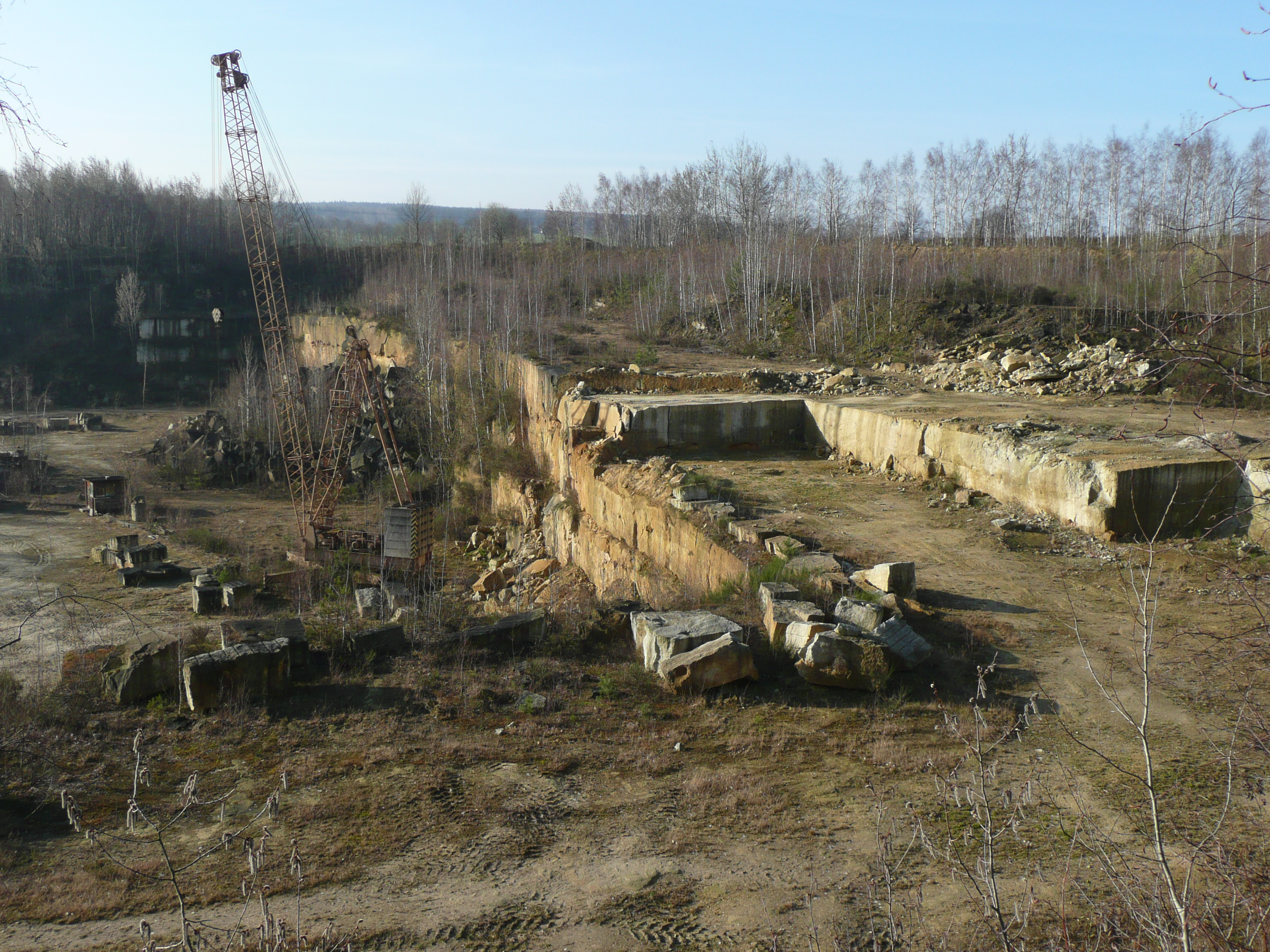
Quarry in the Lohm valley (Lohmgrund) near Cotta

Elbe Sandstone (German: Elbsandstein) describes sandstones that naturally occur in North Bohemia and those parts of Saxony within the area around Dresden. It is named after the River Elbe, which cuts through the sandstone region in a transverse valley, the Elbe Valley Zone. It reaches the surface most strikingly in the Elbe Sandstone Mountains, which are divided into the regions of Saxon Switzerland on German soil and Bohemian Switzerland on Czech territory. The term Elbe Sandstone is used in both geological and economic contexts.

== Geological term ==
In a geological sense, Elbe Sandstone includes all sandstone types that occur in the region of the Elbe Valley and were formed during the Cretaceous period. It consists mainly of quartz grains that are cemented by silica. The ratios and constituents of its accessory minerals are variable. Its deposits border on the area of the Lusatian Massif (Lusatian anticlinal zone), the Meißner Massif, the gneiss of the Eastern Ore Mountains, the Elbe Valley Slate Mountains and the territory of the Czech Republic by the northeastern foothills of the Central Bohemian Uplands and the fringe of the Eger Graben.

== Petrography of quarried Elbe sandstones ==
The bulk of the rock won in the quarries comprises sandstones with a silica cement. These are quartz sandstones, whose quartz grains have intermeshed crystal systems as a result of lithification (diagenesis) at their contact zones. Additional constituents include feldspar, glauconite and ferrous minerals of limonite ore. In the pore space of sandstones of the Cotta type there are the fine-grained minerals of illite, kaolinite and quartz. The kaolinite comes from the chemical weathering of the feldspar (kaolinization). The SiO_{2} thus released contributes considerably to the mutual coalescence of the grains of sand. The pore spaces in sandstones of the Posta type for the most part contain no fillings.

Sandstone from Reinhardtsdorf is an ashlar of the Cotta type with several properties of the Posta type.
In the past sandstone was won in a few quarries, now closed, that had a carbonate content. These sandstones came from deposits close to the surface and were only of low economic value.

The most important properties of these types of ashlar are derived from the presence or absence of fine-grained constituents.

== Stratigraphy ==
Hardened sand sediments of marine origin from the Upper Cretaceous form a sequence of several strata up to 400 metres thick. They have been quarried for centuries and used as ashlars. The deepest-lying, stratigraphically oldest layer is described as Mittelquader ("Middle Ashlar") or Cotta Sandstone, was formed in the Lower Turonian and is mainly used as natural stone for stone carving.

Above that lies Oberquader ("Upper Ashlar") from the Middle Turonian, which is also known as Reinhardtsdorf Sandstone. It forms the main bulk of Elbe sandstone, but has only limited use. Similar to it, but of better quality, is Grillenburg Sandstone, that does not occur in Saxon Switzerland, but at a place of this name in the Tharandt Forest near Dresden, and, like Hetzdorf Sandstone, is one of the Niederschöna layers. Due to their formation within the Elbe Valley Chalk they are also counted as Elbe sandstones, though. These sandstones are no longer quarried.

The uppermost, most recent layer is called Überquader ("Over Ashlar") or Posta Sandstone and occurs, like the similar Wehlen Sandstone, only on the eastern bank of the Elbe. This variety from the Upper Turonian has a high strength and is used as a building stone, especially in a load-bearing role. It was used inter alia in the construction of the Church of Our Lady in Dresden. Similar to it are the sandstones from the Paulsdorf, Höckendorf and Dippoldiswald Heaths, not far from Dippoldiswalde near Dresden.

== Gallery ==
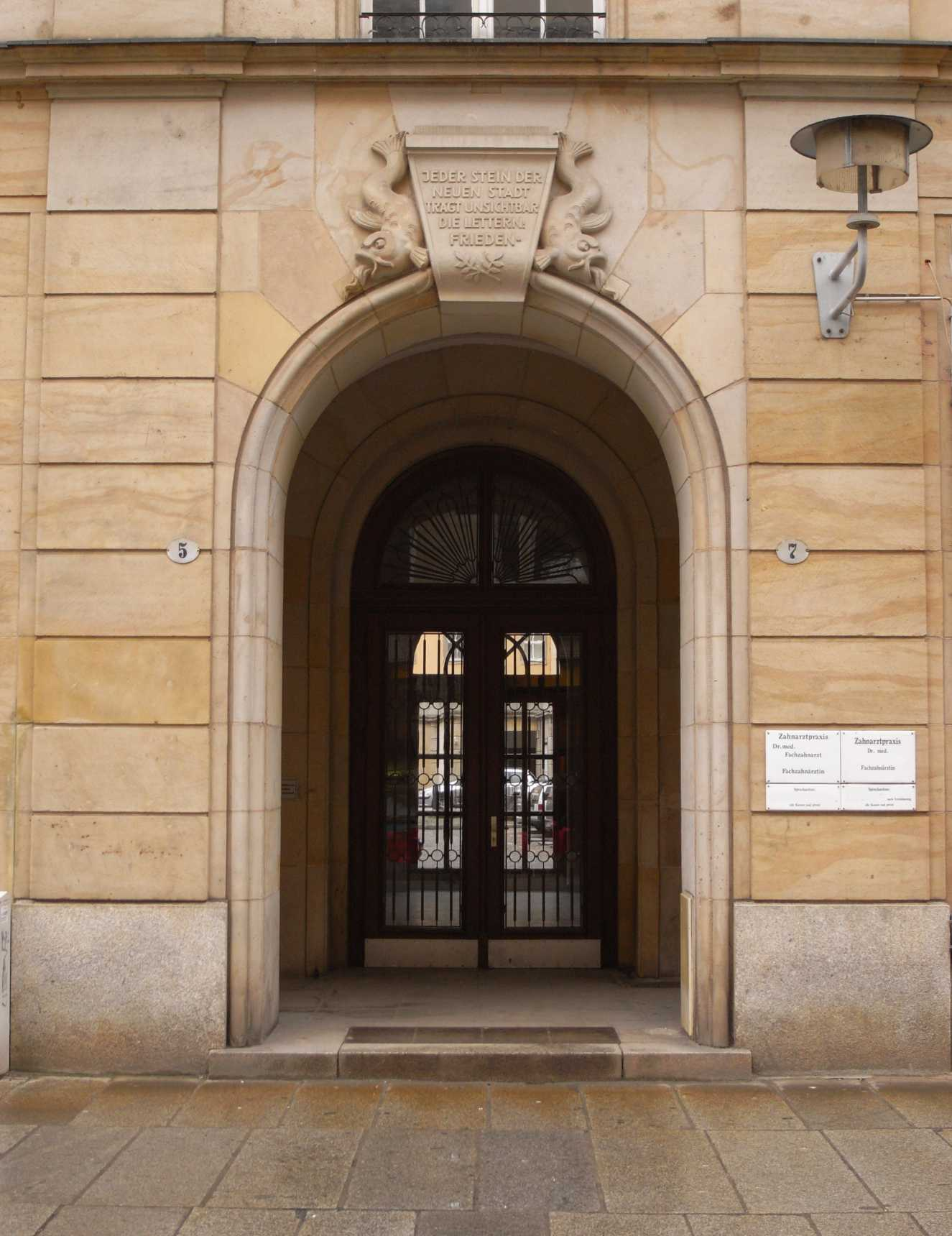
Portal in Dresden's Altstadt (Weiße Gasse), sandstone type: Posta

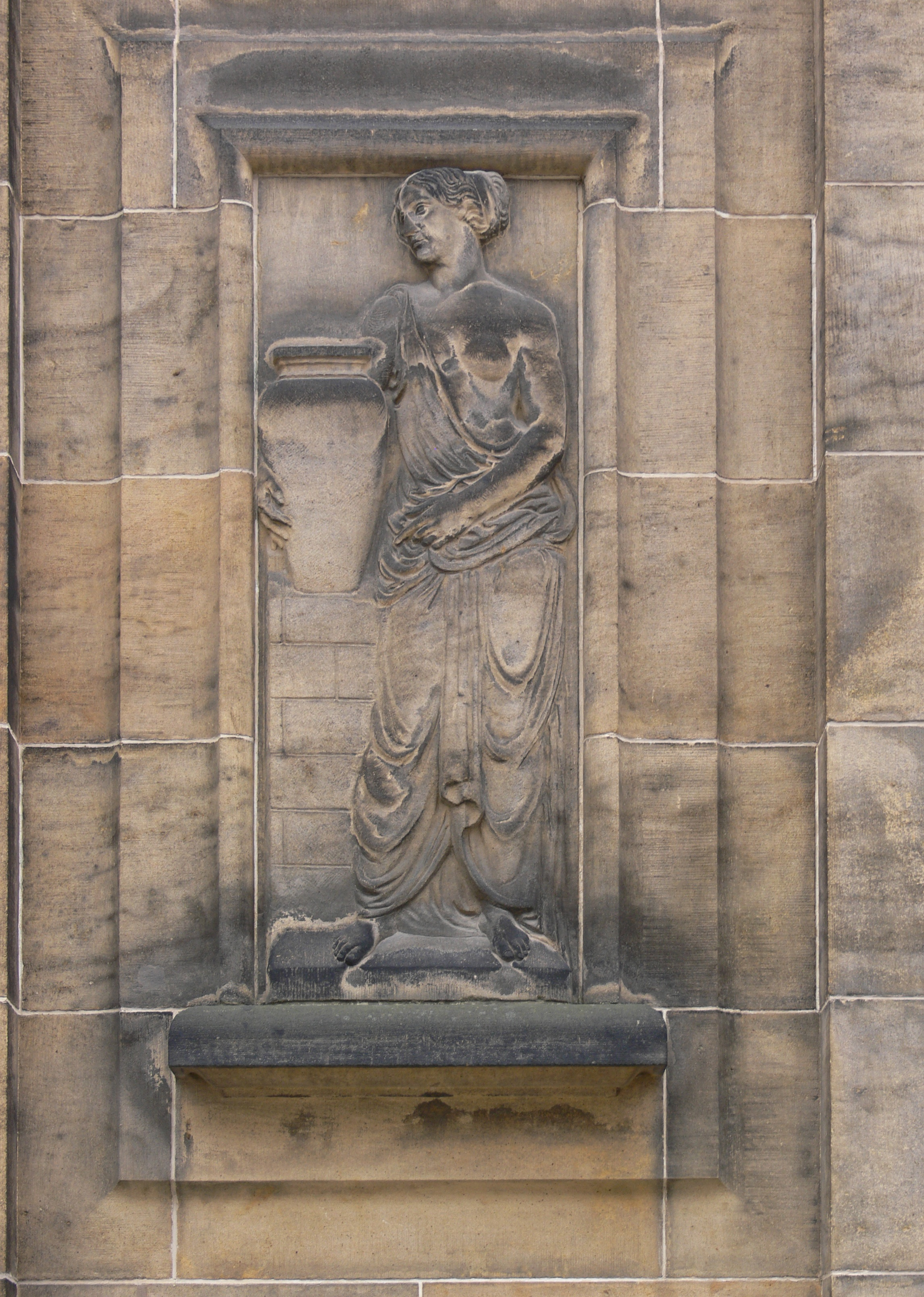
Bas-relief on St. James' in Chemnitz, sandstone type: Posta

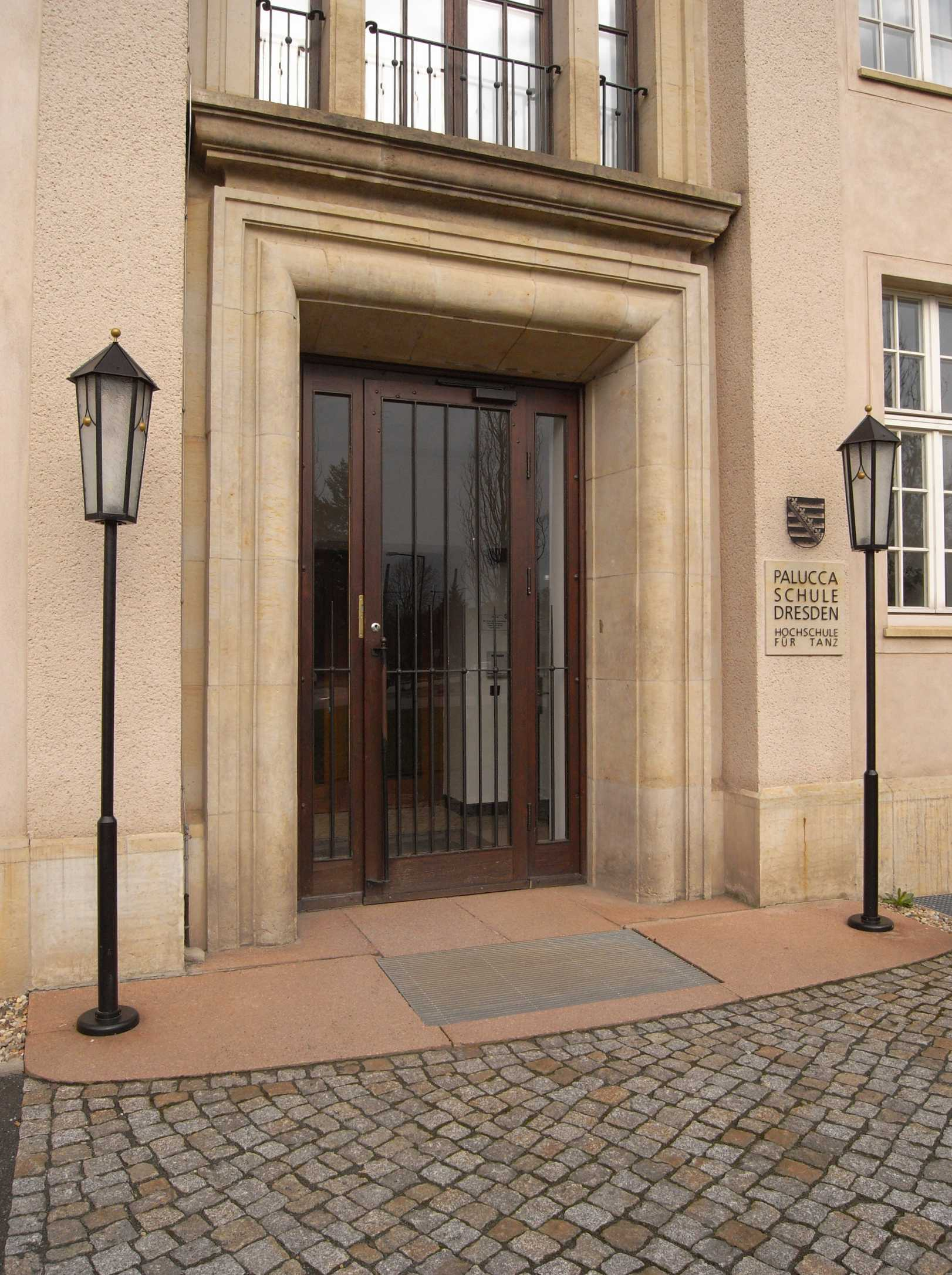
Main entrance of the Palucca School of Dance, Dresden, door frames in sandstone of type: Cotta

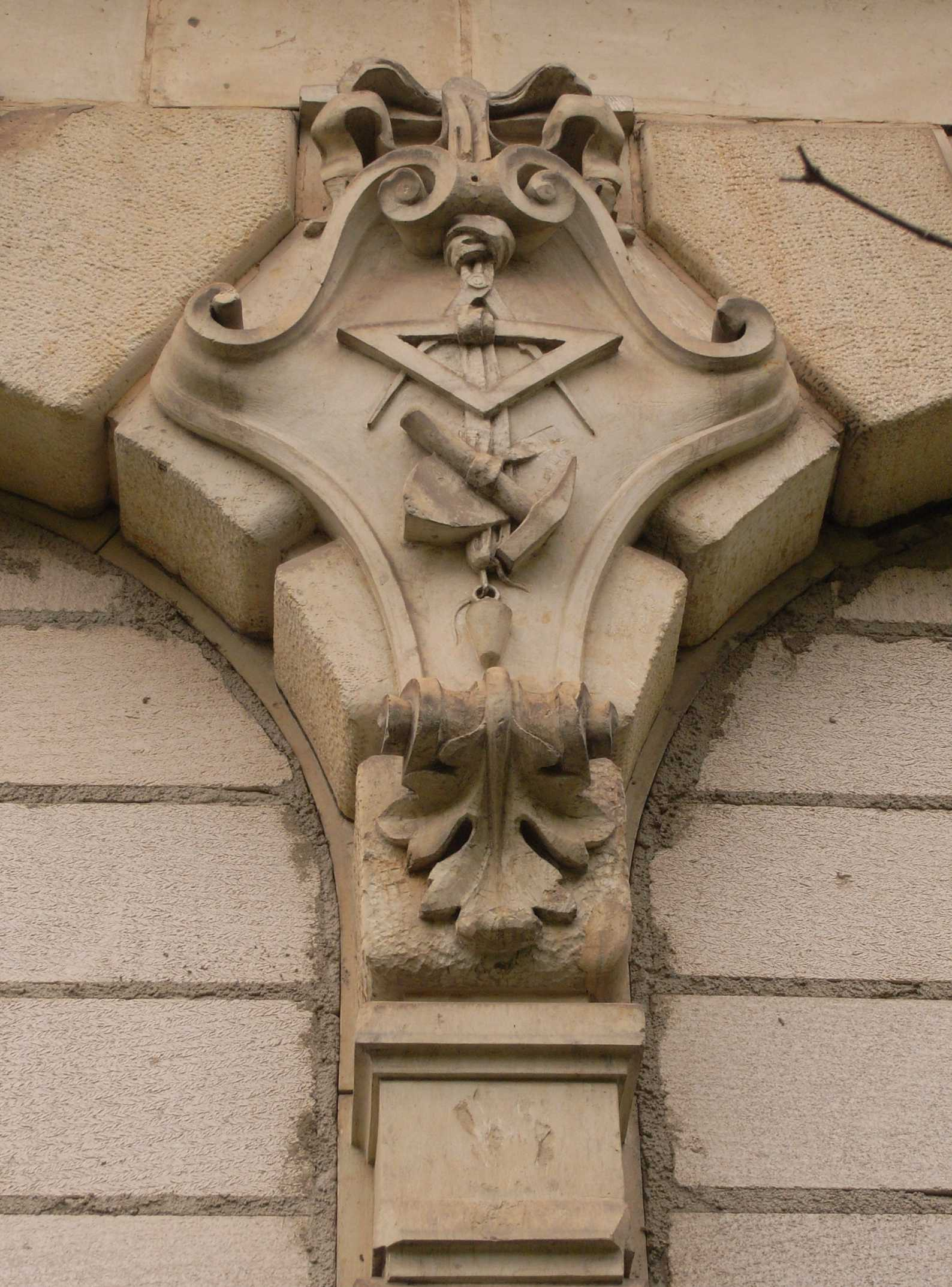
Decoration in Chemnitz, sandstone type: Cotta

== Transport ==
For one of the main quarrying sites, the quarry in the Lohmgrund south of Pirna, the Pirna–Großcotta railway was built. Many of the quarries in the Elbe valley between Pirna and Děčín were able to ship their products either on the Elbe or on the Dresden–Děčín railway.

== See also ==
- List of sandstones
