= Reinhardtsdorf Sandstone =

Type of sandstone from Germany

Coordinates: 50°53′51″N 14°10′15″E

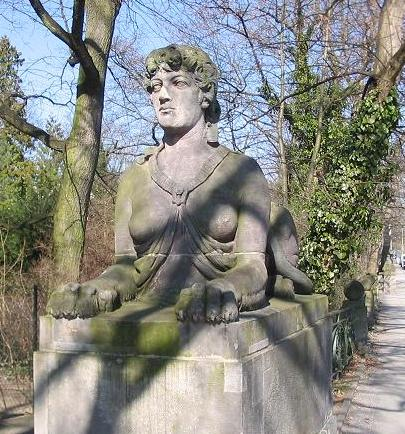
Guardian on the Bismarck bridge in Halensee near Berlin

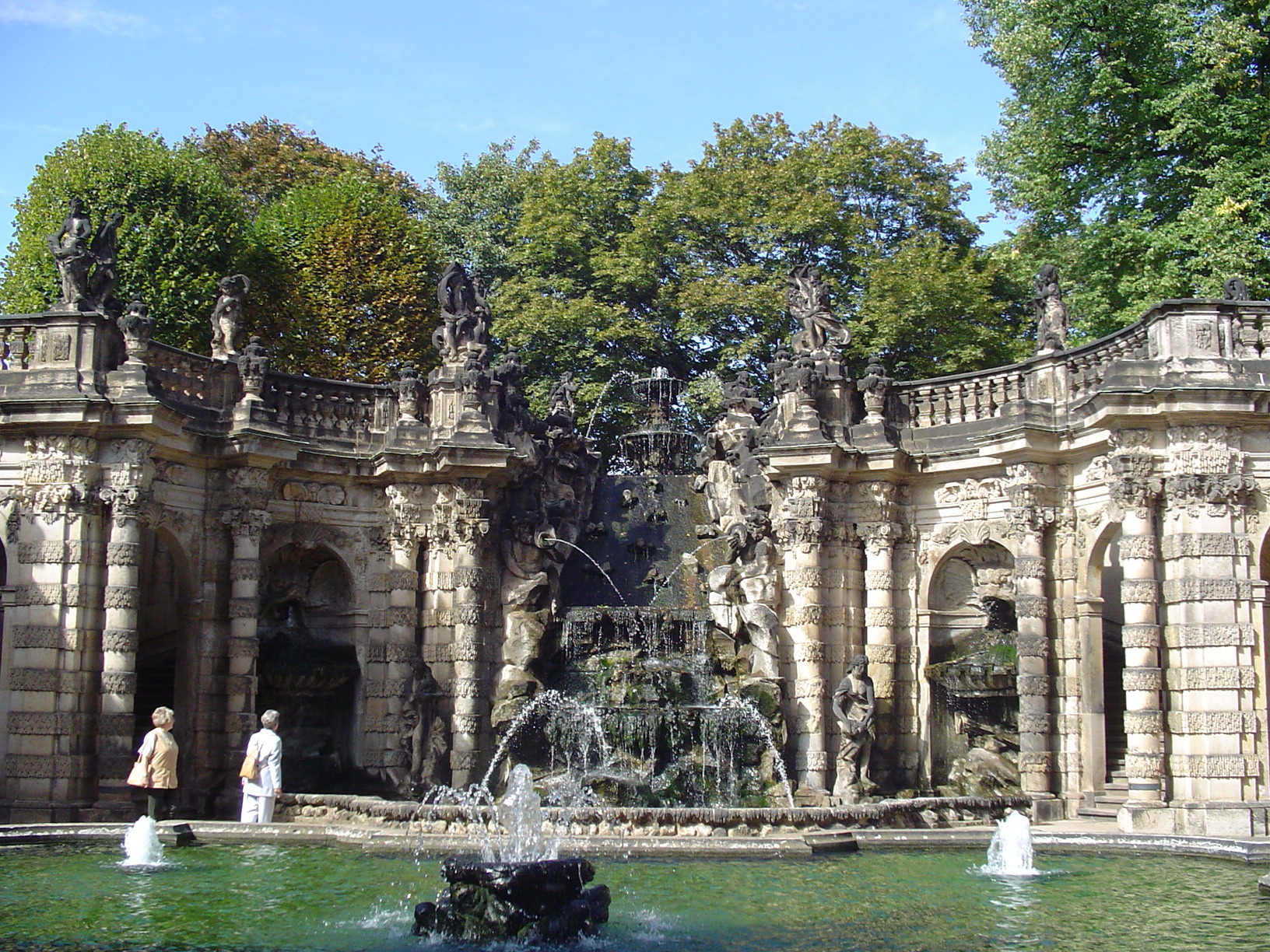
Fountain by the Nymph Pool in Dresden's Zwinger Palace

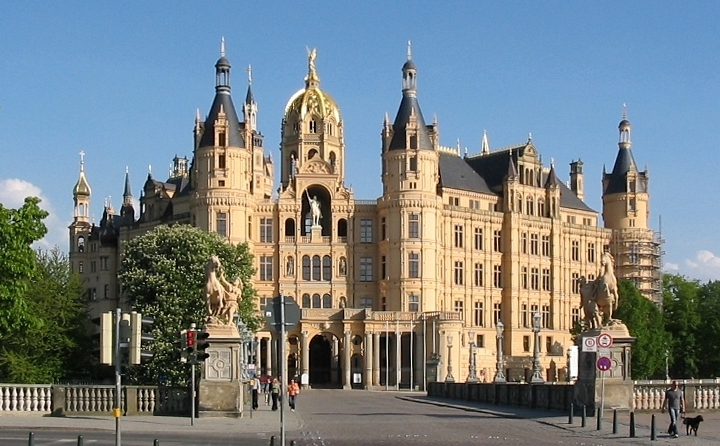
Schwerin Castle

Reinhardtsdorf Sandstone (German: Reinhardtsdorfer Sandstein, also Oberquader or Hauptsandstein) is quarried in the vicinity of Reinhardtsdorf near Pirna in the district of Sächsische Schweiz-Osterzgebirge in the German Free State of Saxony. It is the so-called main sandstone of the Elbe sandstones, and was formed in the Middle Turonian. In 2008 there was one quarry that won this particular sandstone.

== See also ==
- List of sandstones
- Cotta Sandstone
- Posta Sandstone
- Wehlen Sandstone

== Sources ==
- W. Dienemann und O. Burre: Die nutzbaren Gesteine Deutschlands und ihre Lagerstätten mit Ausnahme der Kohlen, Erze und Salze, Enke-Verlag, Stuttgart 1929.
- Siegfried Grunert: Der Elbsandstein: Vorkommen, Verwendung, Eigenschaften. In: Geologica Saxonica Journal of Central European Geology 52/53 (2007), p. 143-204 (Digitalisat)
