= Podhorní Újezd a Vojice =

- Municipality
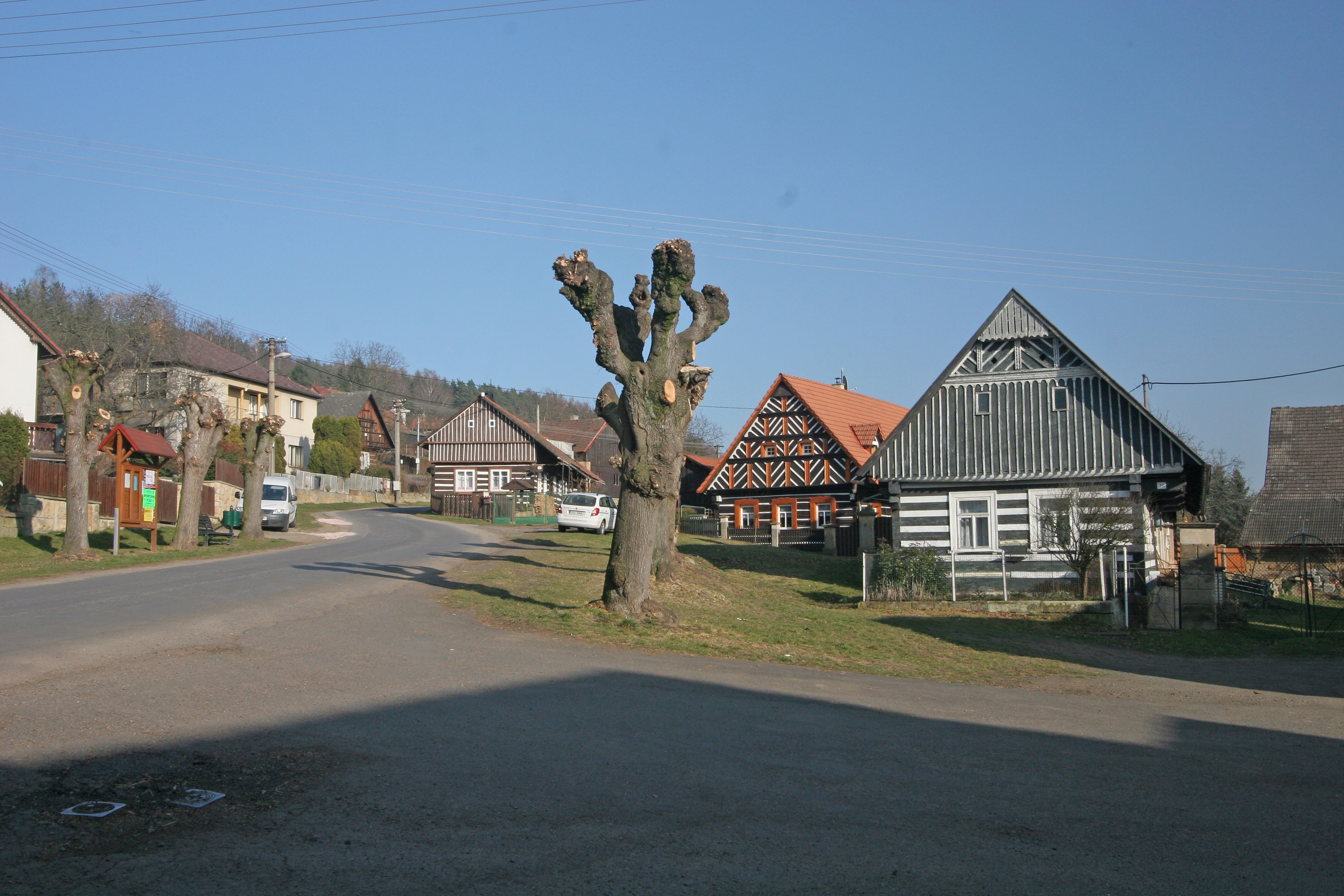
- Folk architecture in Vojice

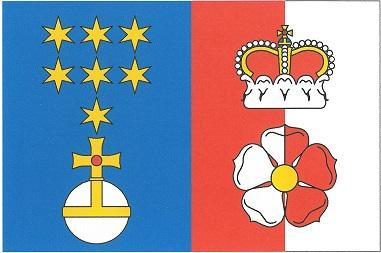
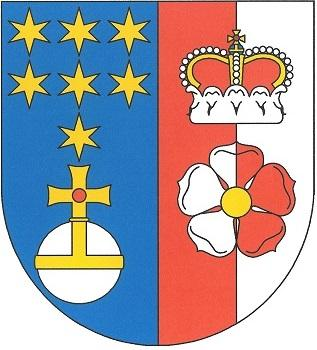
- Flag Coat of arms

- Location in the Czech Republic
- Coordinates: 50°23′20″N 15°31′16″E
- Country: Czech Republic
- Region: Hradec Králové
- District: Jičín
- First mentioned: 1357

Area
  - Total: 6.89 km^{2} (2.66 sq mi)
- Elevation: 294 m (965 ft)

Population (2026-01-01)
  - Total: 640
  - Density: 93/km^{2} (240/sq mi)
- Time zone: UTC+1 (CET)
  - Summer (DST): UTC+2 (CEST)
- Postal codes: 507 54, 508 01
- Website: www.podhorniujezd.cz

Podhorní Újezd a Vojice is a municipality in Jičín District in the Hradec Králové Region of the Czech Republic. It has about 600 inhabitants.

== Administrative division ==
Podhorní Újezd a Vojice consists of two municipal parts (in brackets population according to the 2021 census):

- Podhorní Újezd (259)
- Vojice (344)

== Demographics ==
Historical population
Year	Pop.	±%
1869	1,228	—
1880	1,332	+8.5%
1890	1,386	+4.1%
1900	1,277	−7.9%
1910	1,303	+2.0%
1921	1,156	−11.3%
1930	1,114	−3.6%
1950	726	−34.8%
1961	728	+0.3%
1970	657	−9.8%
1980	621	−5.5%
1991	585	−5.8%
2001	589	+0.7%
2011	599	+1.7%
2021	603	+0.7%
Source: Censuses
