= Cotta Sandstone =

Type of sandstone found in Germany

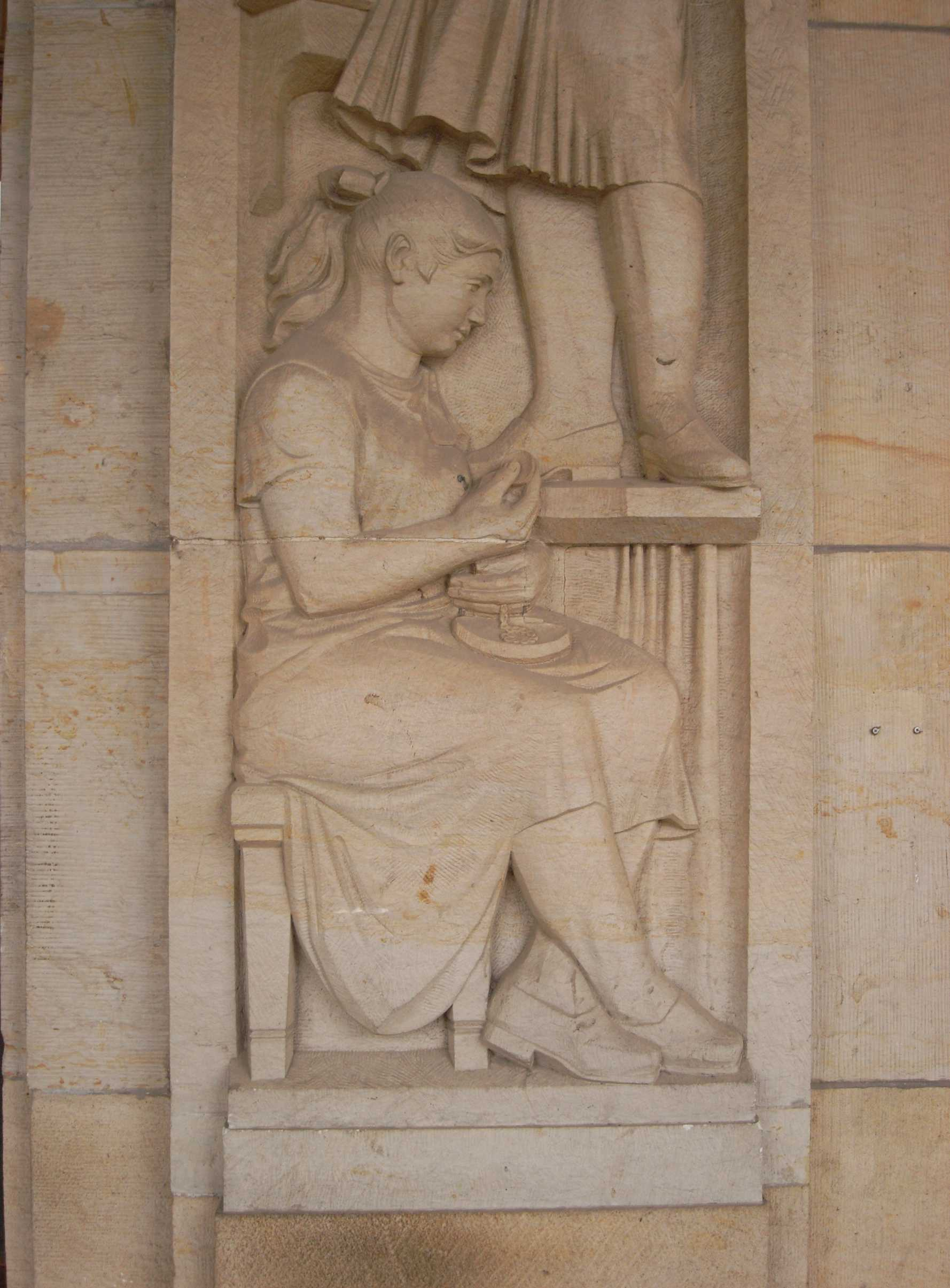
Stone sculpture relief on the Altmarkt- west side in Dresden, sandstone type: Cotta

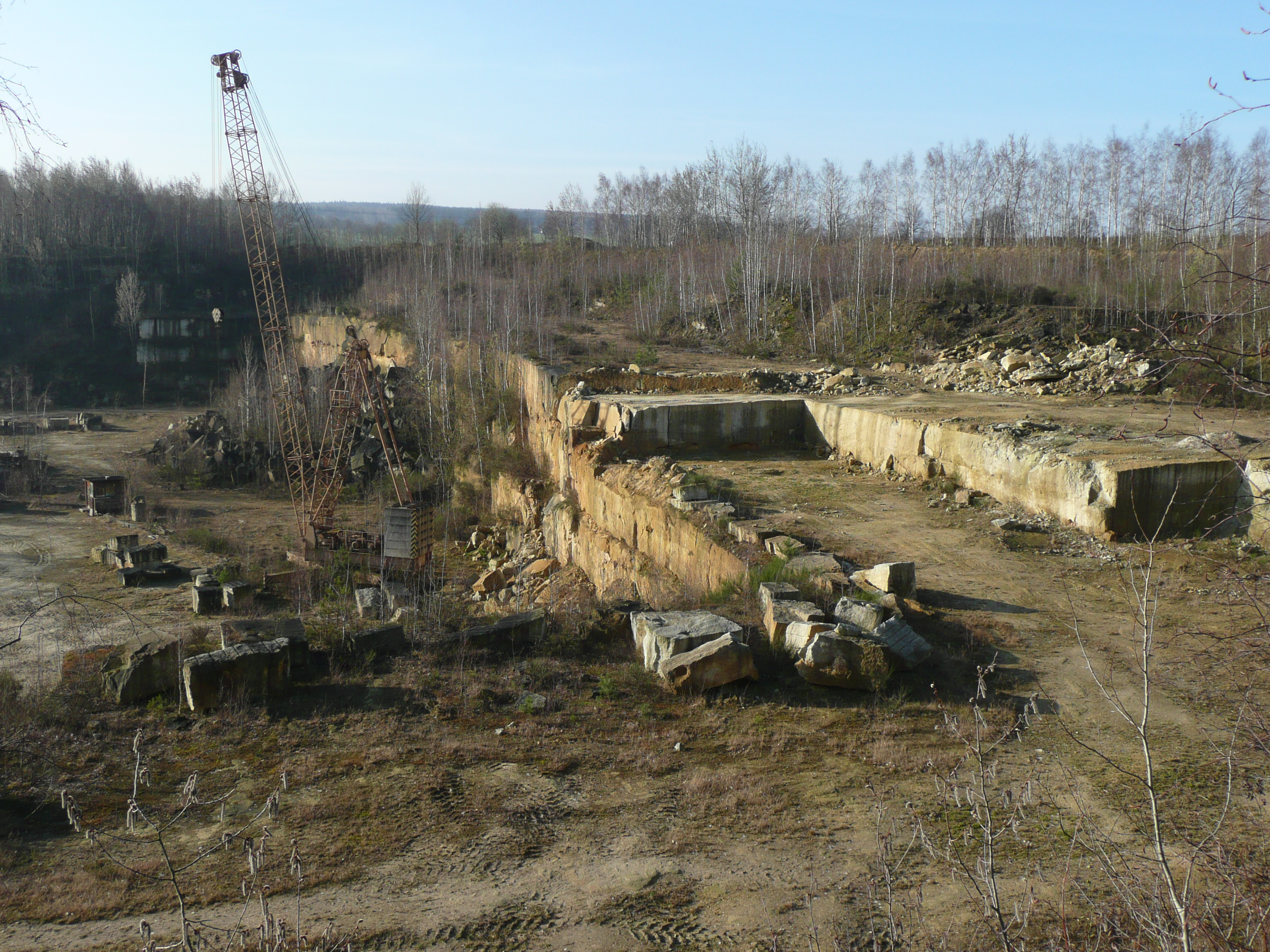
Cotta Sandstone quarry in the Lohmgrund near Cotta

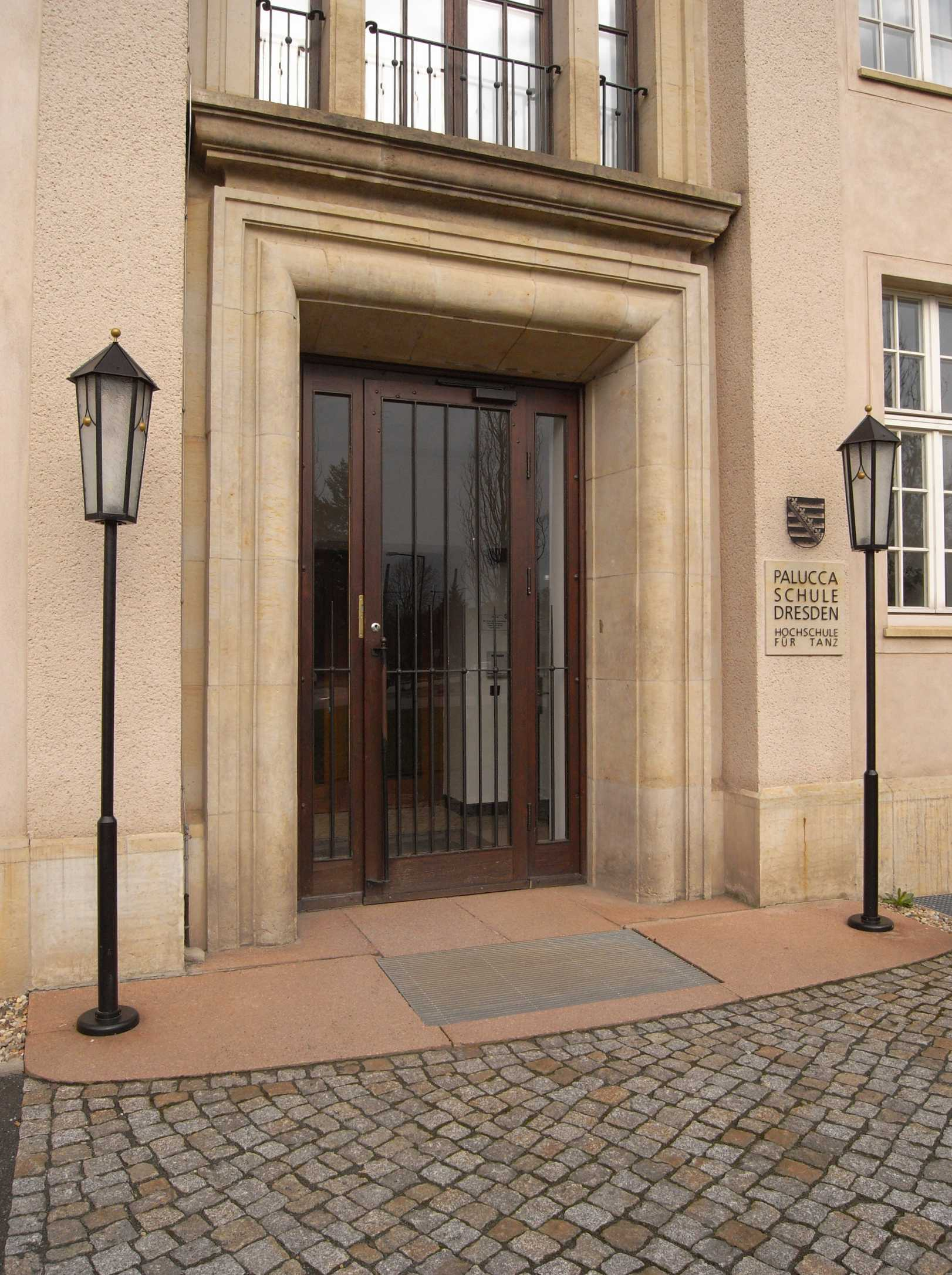
Main entrance of the Palucca School of Dance, Dresden, Door frames in sandstone of type: Cotta

Cotta Sandstone (German: Cottaer Sandstein, also called Mittelquader) is found in the Elbe Valley and in its numerous tributary valleys. Its main deposit lies in the west of the Elbe Sandstone Mountains, where it runs up to the Bohemian border, ending south of Pirna. It is named after the village of Cotta in the borough of Dohma, an area where the stone is quarried.

== Formation and properties ==
Cotta Sandstone was formed in the Cretaceous, in the Lower Turonian age. It is one of the Elbe sandstones and its colours range from whitish to grey and yellowish grey. In the south of the area Cotta Sandstone is medium-grained, whilst, in the north it is fine-grained. Around the village of Cotta itself the grain size is evenly sized at 0.1 to 0.22 millimetres and only very rarely as large as 0.3 millimetres. The rock contains the smallest elements of mica minerals (glauconite), decomposed feldspar and carbon elements. The carbon particles are arranged in clearly recognisable veins. They occasionally resemble marble textures.

The technical value of this natural stone varies considerably, because the quartz grains of Cotta Sandstone are frequently siliceously bonded, but it has many unevenly divided deposits of the phyllosilicates, illite and kaolinite.

== Extraction ==
The stone is quarried in Dohma (Groß-Cotta), Bad Gottleuba-Berggießhübel (in the villages of Gottleuba and Berggießhübel), Langhennersdorf, Rottwerndorf, at Neundorf and Lohmgrund south of Pirna, in Gersdorf and Bahretal (Ottendorf), and in the Krippenbach valley. The quarrying of Elbe sandstones is made technically easier because of the separation of the beds with alternating outcrops and fissures, because the fissures are vertical and the beds run roughly at right angles to them. As a result, it is possible to cut rectangular blocks of unfinished stone. The thickness of the quarry-able sandstone beds varies from a ½ to 3 metres. The thickness of the deposits of Cotta Sandstone ranges between 50 and 80 metres.

== Use ==
=== General use ===
Formerly the sandstone quarried near Langhennersdorf, Berggießhübel and Gersdorf, which was larger-grained, was cut not only for use as building or sculpting stone, but also for millstones. Today (2008) Cotta Sandstone is used for solid window and door frames, sculpture work and high-profile stonemasonry. It is especially used in restoration, but also in new structures. Its most important use is for sculptures.

== Gallery ==
Art-historic use of Cotta Stone

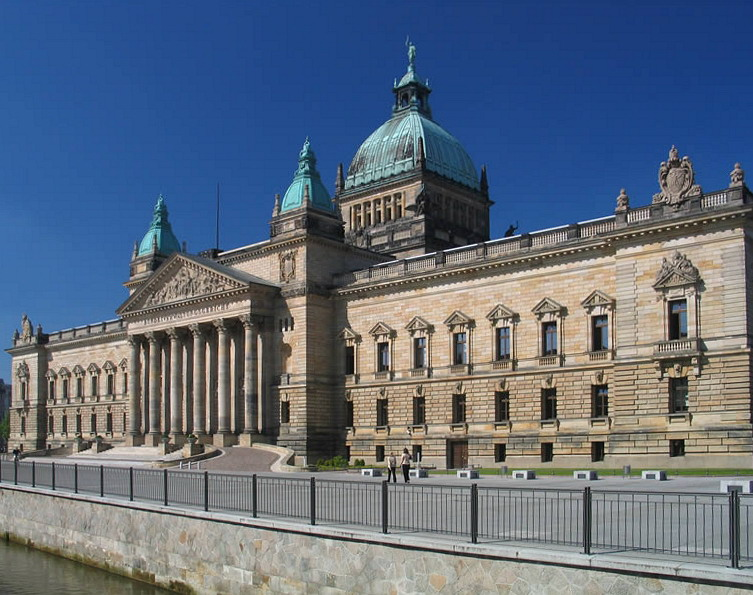
Reich Court building in Leipzig

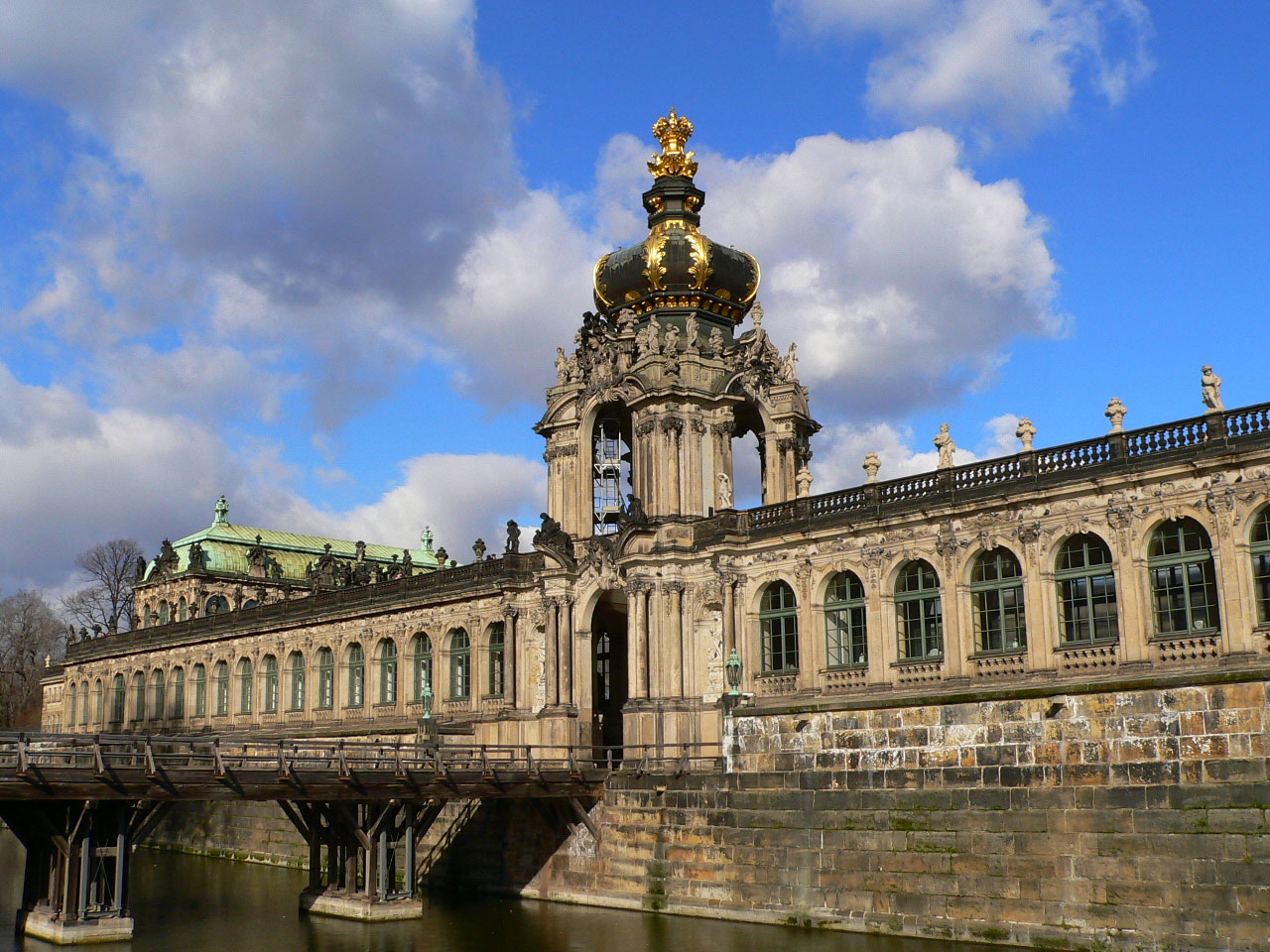
Dresdner Zwinger

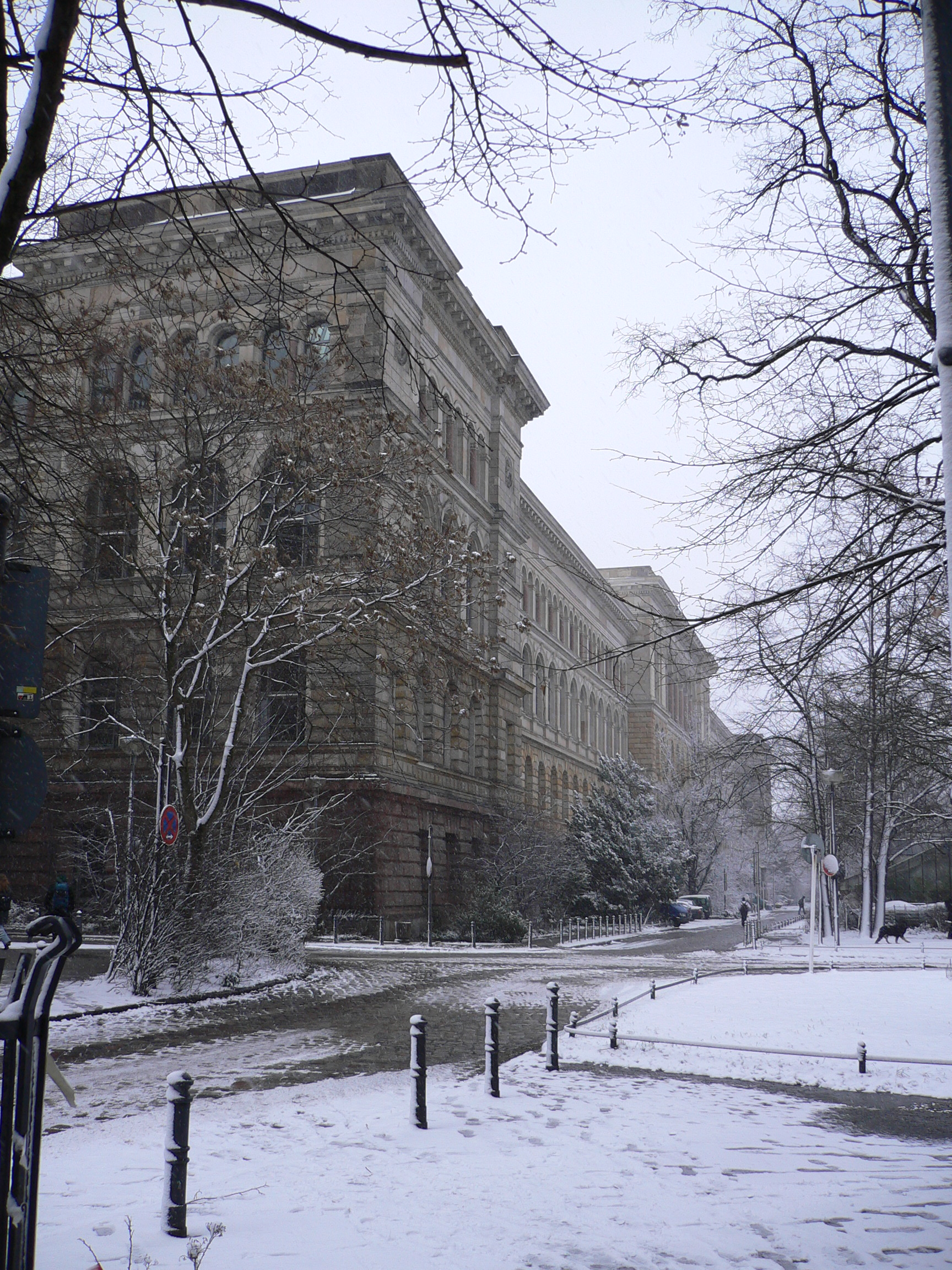
TU Berlin

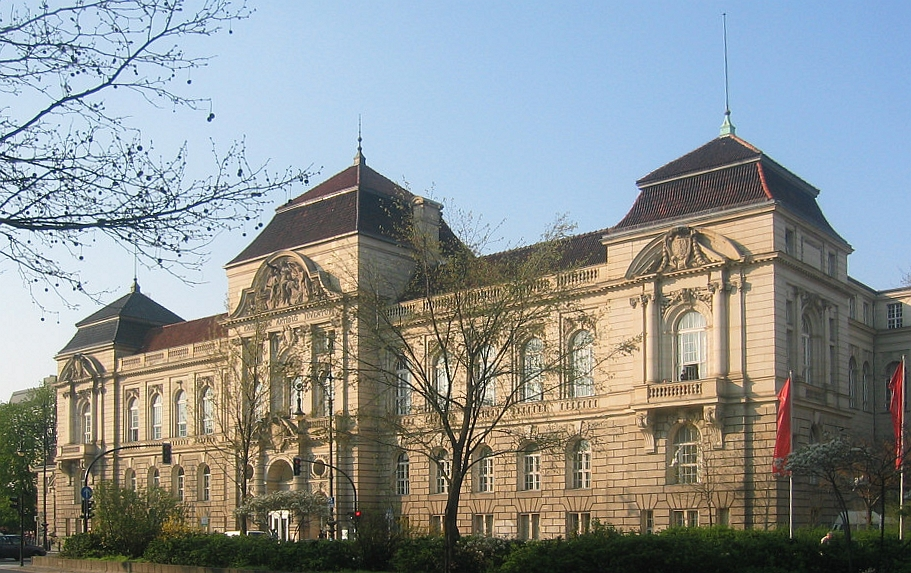
University of Arts, Berlin, Fasanenstraße

== See also ==
- List of sandstones
- Posta Sandstone
- Reinhardtsdorf Sandstone
- Wehlen Sandstone

== Sources ==
- W. Dienemann und O. Burre: Die nutzbaren Gesteine Deutschlands und ihre Lagerstätten mit Ausnahme der Kohlen, Erze und Salze, Enke-Verlag, Stuttgart 1929.
- Siegfried Grunert: Der Elbsandstein: Vorkommen, Verwendung, Eigenschaften. In: Geologica Saxonica Journal of Central European Geology 52/53 (2007), p. 143-204 (Digitalisat)
