= Posta Sandstone =

Type of sandstone found in Germany

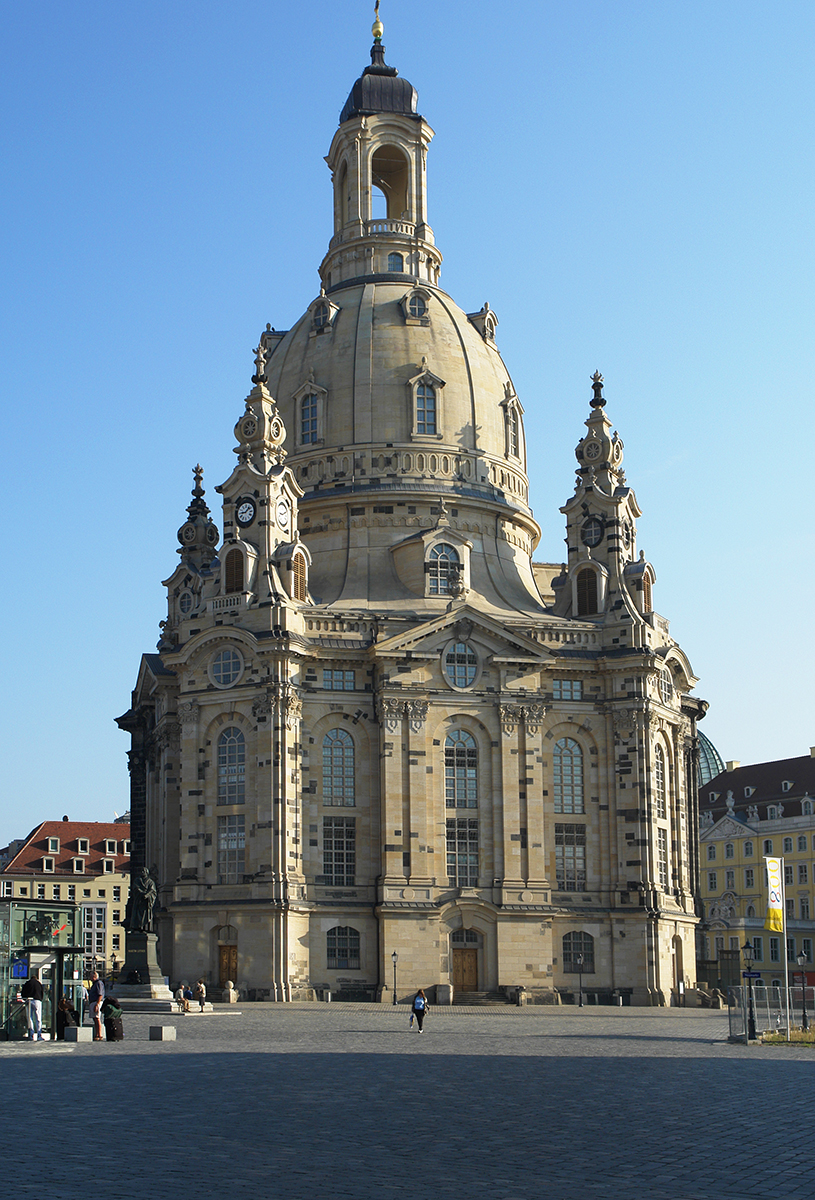
Church of Our Lady, Dresden, made of Posta Sandstone

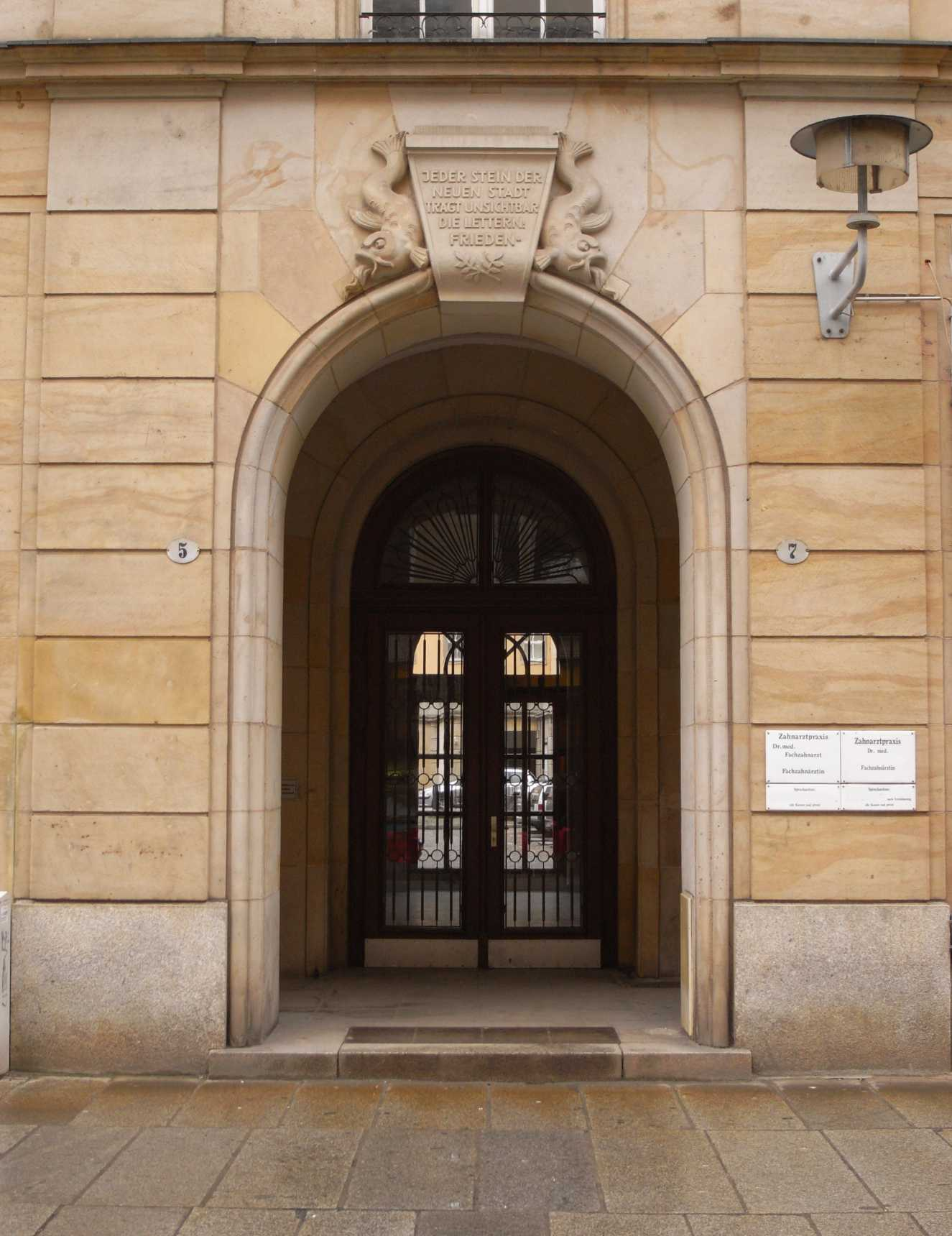
Posta Sandstone in Dresden's Altstadt (Weiße Gasse), plinth and paving stones of Lusatian Granodiorite

Posta Sandstone (German: Postaer Sandstein), also called Wehlen Sandstone (Wehlener Sandstein), only occurs on the eastern banks of the River Elbe at Alte Poste, near Herrenleithe, Wehlen, Zeichen and Posta. The thickness of the deposit is between 30 and 50 metres. It is also known as Überquader ("Over Ashlar") and has the smallest deposit of all the Elbe sandstones. In 2008 it was being quarried in the areas around the village of Lohmen and in Wehlen.

== Quarrying and use ==
In 2008, Posta Sandstone was being won in two quarries in the Wesenitz valley and it was being used for solid window and door frames, façade slabs, sculptor's blocks and high-profile masonry work. It is used especially in restoration work and sometimes also in new structures. The following is a selection of the structures built in Posta Sandstone:

- Berlin:
  - Ground floor of Technische Universität Berlin in Charlottenburg
- Dresden:
  - Old Town (Altmarkt) (rebuilding after the Second World War)
  - Bismarck towers
  - Dresden Bank buildings
  - Anne's Church
  - Eckberg Castle
  - Dresden central station
  - Cosel Palace
  - Church of Our Lady
  - Zwinger Palace, brown studio
  - Albrechtsberg Palace
- Hamburg:
  - Villa Offen
- Magdeburg:
  - Alte Wache
- Senftenberg:
  - War memorials for the dead of World War I
Art-historic use of Posta Stone

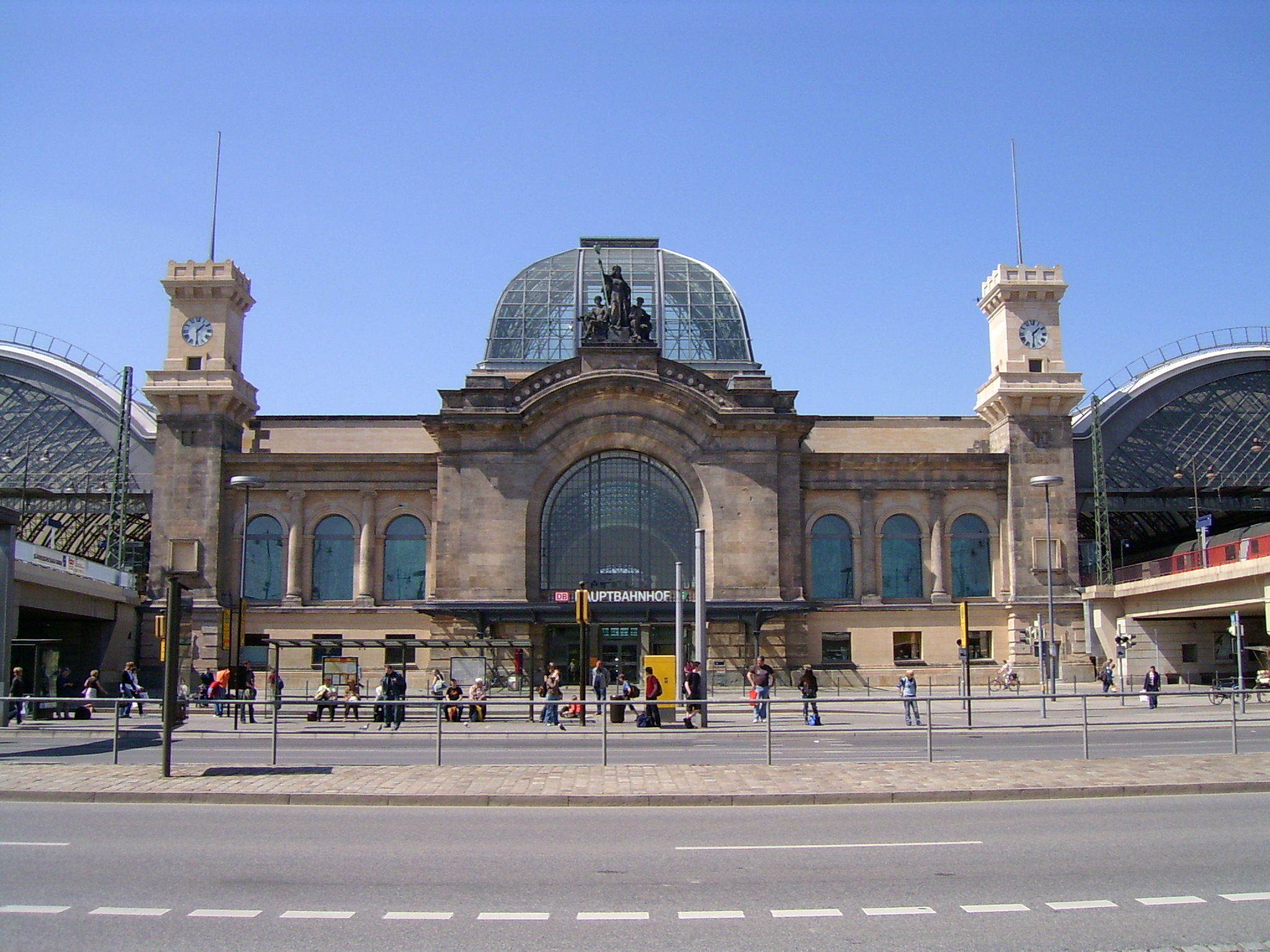
Dresden central station

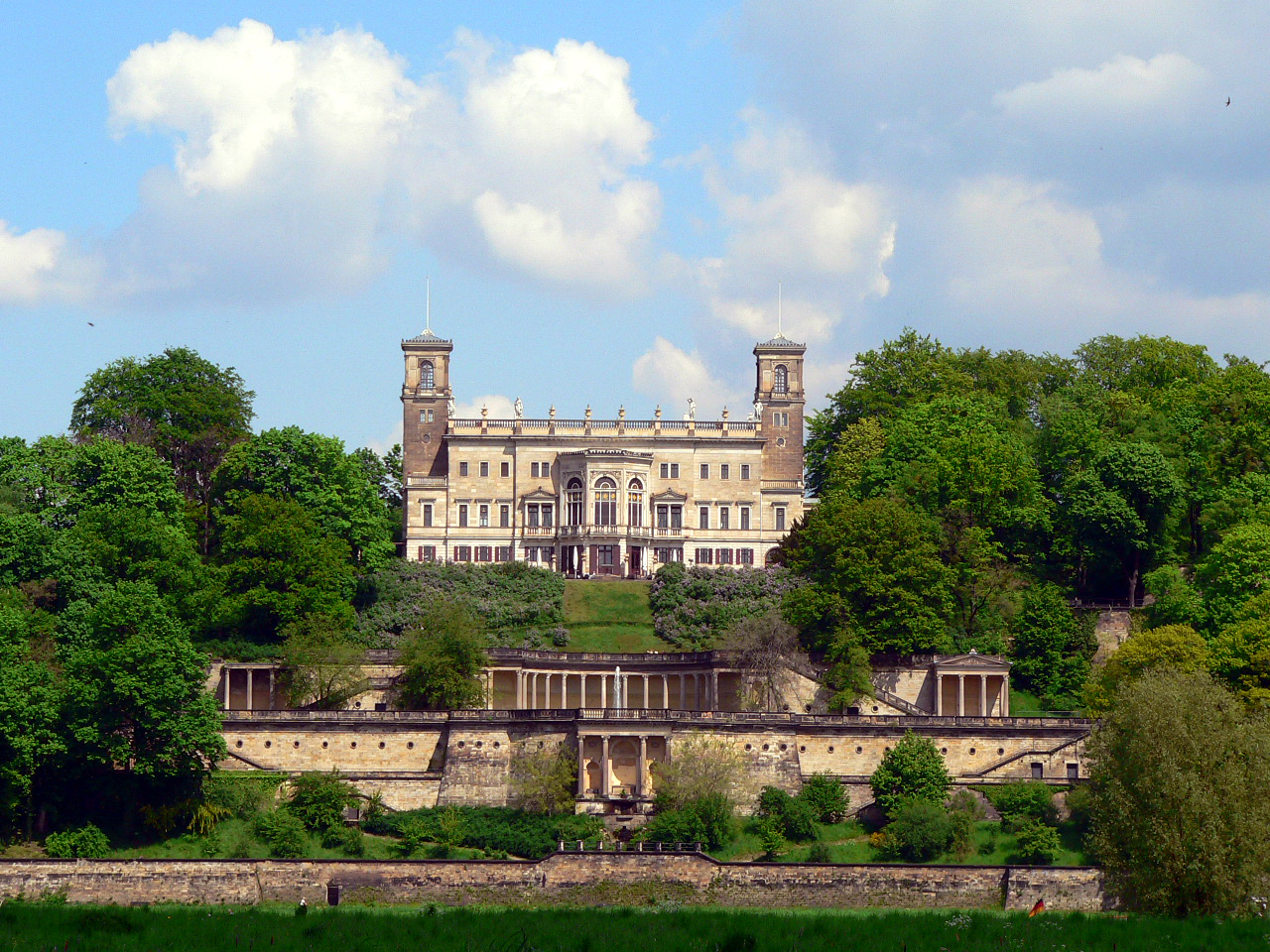
Albrechtsberg Castle, Dresden

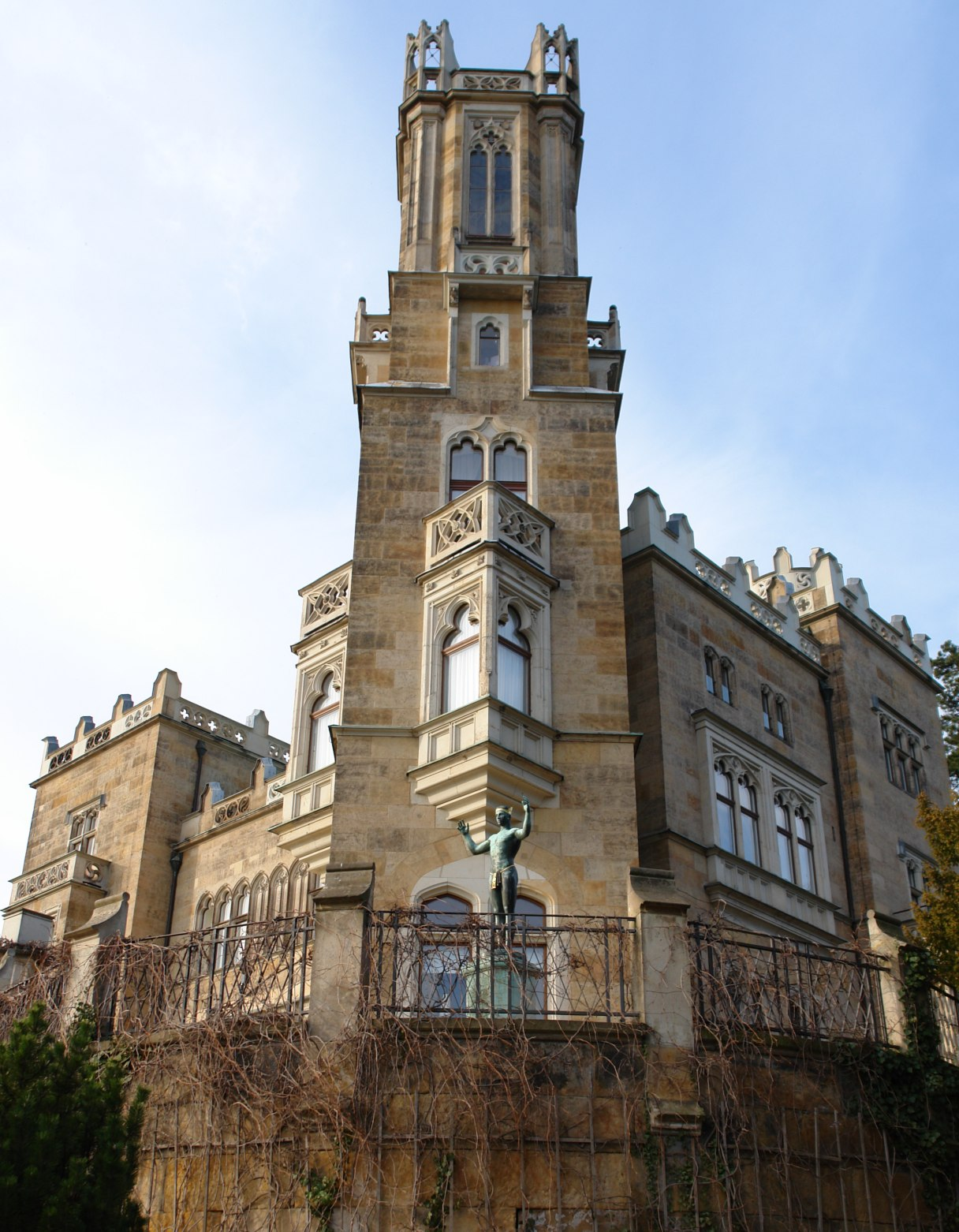
Eckstein Castle, Dresden

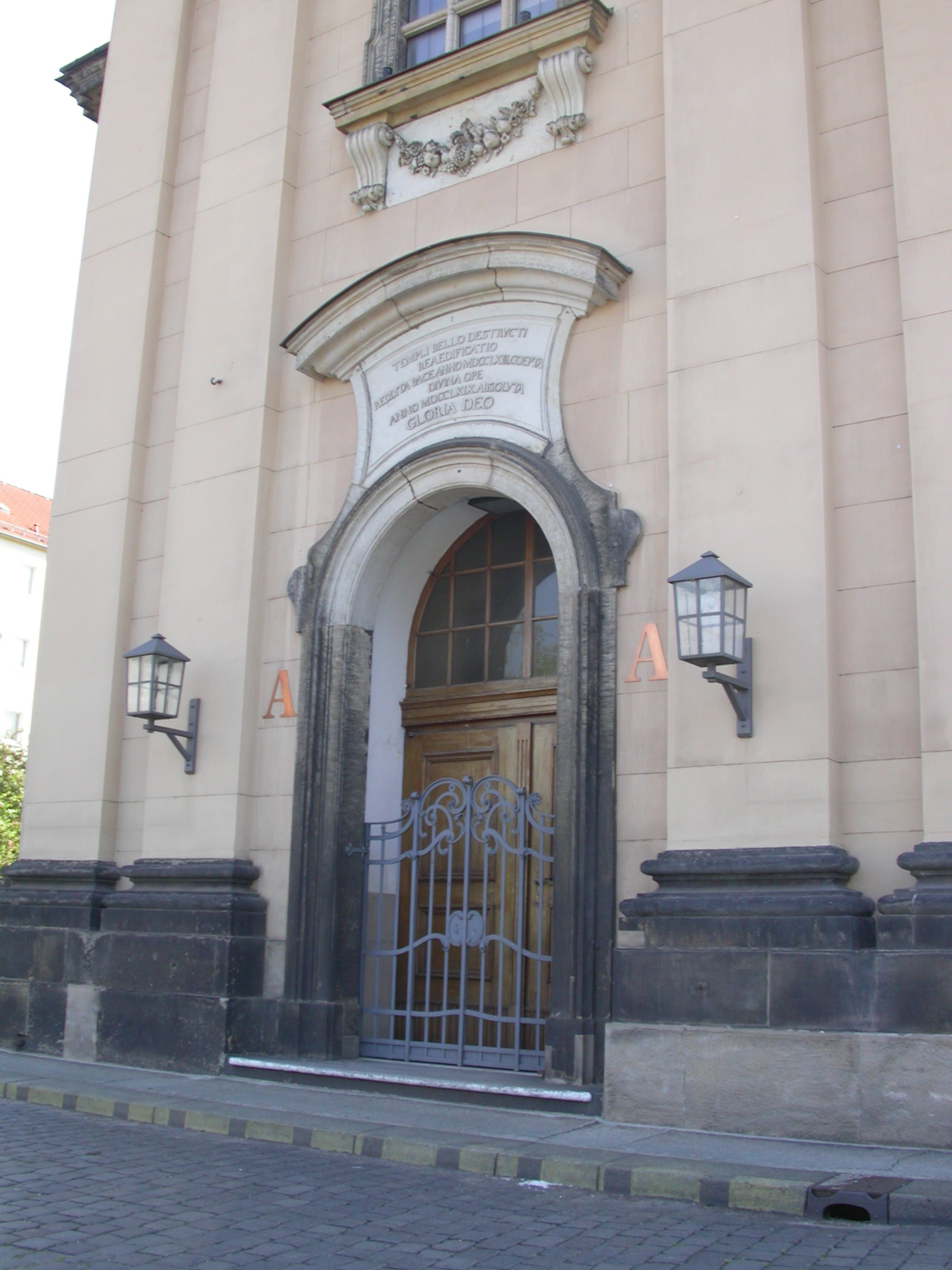
Entrance to Anne's Church, Dresden

== See also ==
- List of sandstones
- Cotta Sandstone
- Reinhardtsdorf Sandstone
- Wehlen Sandstone

== Sources ==
- W. Dienemann und O. Burre: Die nutzbaren Gesteine Deutschlands und ihre Lagerstätten mit Ausnahme der Kohlen, Erze und Salze, Enke-Verlag, Stuttgart 1929, p. 304ff
- Siegfried Grunert: Der Elbsandstein: Vorkommen, Verwendung, Eigenschaften. In: Geologica Saxonica Journal of Central European Geology 52/53 (2007), p. 143-204 (Digitalisat)
