= Kulmer Steig =

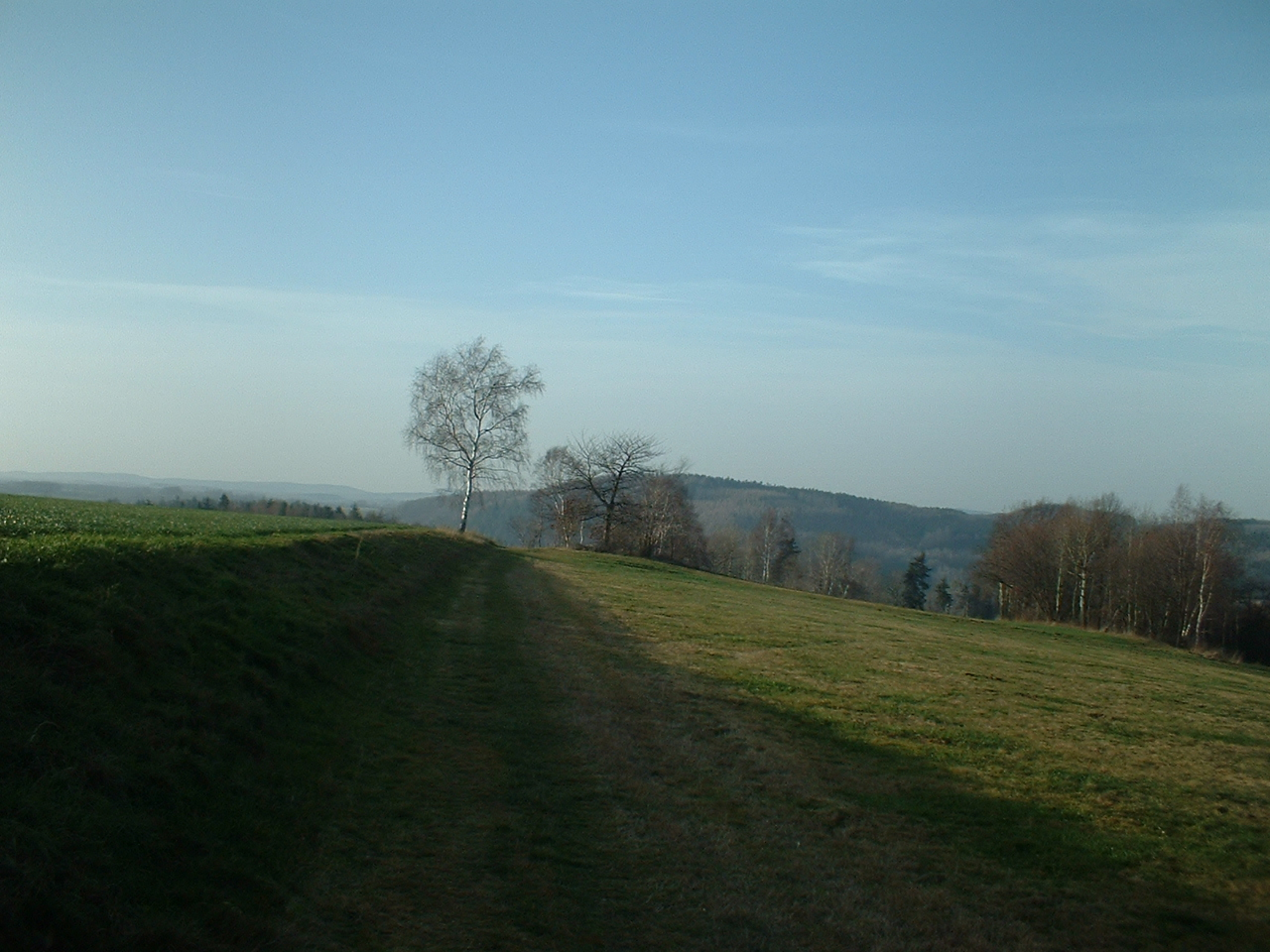
The Kulmer Steig near Bad Gottleuba

The Kulmer Steig (Czech: Chlumecká stezka) is a synonym for the transport links from the Elbe valley over the eastern part of the Eastern Ore Mountains to Bohemian Chlumec u Chabařovic (German: Kulm), hence the name which means "Kulm Trail". It is an ancient road system of partly derelict and unmetalled historic transport routes. These historic long-distance routes have been uncovered today thanks to archaeological discoveries. The routes all head south from the Elbe valley between Dresden and Pirna and cross the Eastern Ore Mountains over mountain passes on the Saxon side between Fürstenwalde in the west and Oelsen in the east. The lowest crossings are located near Mohelnice from where they continue via Habartice and the Geiersberg as well as Krasný Les and further on over the Nollendorf Pass to Chlumec. The Kulmer Steig was an especially good transport route because the road cut a passage through untamed wilderness and 30 kilometres could be covered in a day.

In places it overlaps with the Old Kings Way (Alter Königsweg or Via Regia) from Cologne to Kraków and Berlin to Prague and the Salt Road (Salzstraße) from Halle to Prague.

== Route ==
From a cursory examination of the geography one may wonder why the direct route from Dresden to Bohemia running south through the Ore Mountains was not preferred, or even a route along the banks of the Elbe.

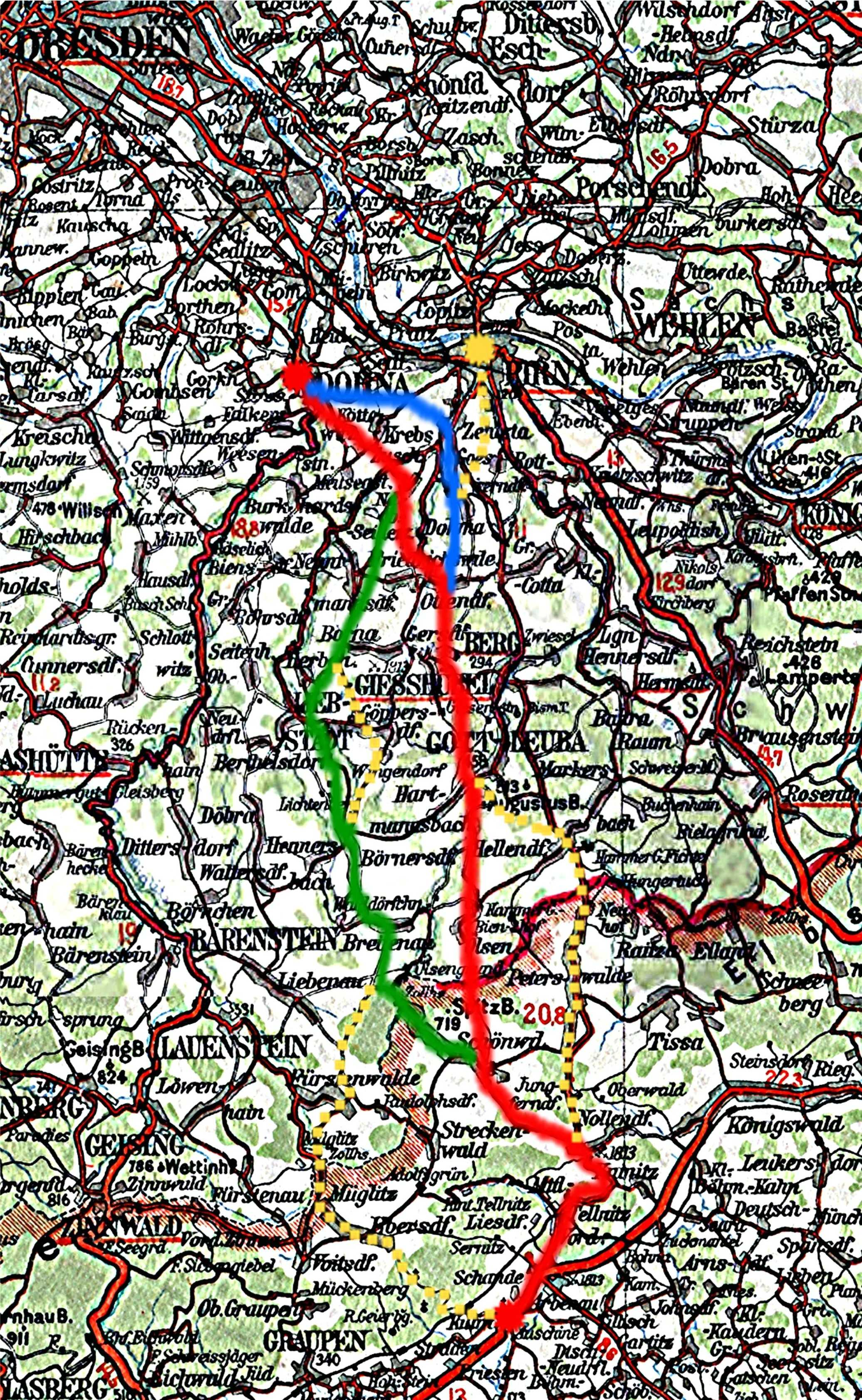
Ancient road system of the Kulmer Steig: main route (red), eastern route (blue), western route (green), branches (yellow)

Both routes had major disadvantages. The one from Dresden running south over the Freital Heights (Freitaler Höhen) crosses the Ore Mountains near Zinnwald/Cínovec at a height of at least 850 metres above sea level (at Cínovec). The ascents and the descent on the Bohemian side are very steep in places and the climatic conditions, especially in winter, are rather severe, as users of the B 170 federal road still experience today in the Altenberg/Zinnwald area each winter. The riverbank route close to the Elbe, by contrast, runs through a canyon-like ravine in Bohemian Switzerland which, taking into account security considerations, was viewed as rather unsafe by travelling merchants, because the sparsely populated region offered little protection. The castles in Saxon and Bohemian Switzerland, especially after the impoverishment of their noble owners in the 15th century, also tended to favour robber baronies rather than protection of the trading routes.

The use of the eastern part of the East Ore Mountains, despite being something of a detour, only had moderate gradients and more favourable weather conditions. The crest itself was only about 700 m above sea level at the Nakléřov Pass.

Dohna formed an outstandingly well protected entrance into the Mohelnice valley with its castles on the Robisch and the Reichsburg on the Schlossberg opposite and enabled a very safe passage and crossing of the lower Eastern Ore Mountains. From here there were several different route options:

- Eastern route: Zehista – Dohma – Ottendorf – Gersdorf – Gottleuba – Oelsen – Krásný Les – Nakléřov – Chlumec
- Main route: Köttewitz – Meusegast – Niederseidewitz – Ottendorf – Gersdorf – Gottleuba – Oelsen – Krásný Les – Nakléřov – Chlumec
- Western route: Köttewitz – Meusegast – Niederseidewitz – Nentmannsdorf – Herbergen – Liebstadt – Börnersdorf – Breitenau – Krásný Les – Nakléřov – Chlumec

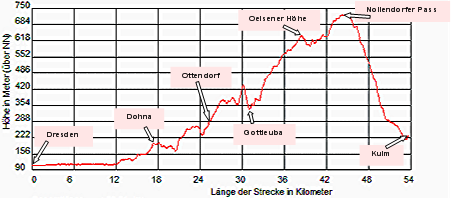
Section through the Kulmer Steig (main route)

Pirna as well, with its ford over the Elbe, offered a good entry point into this mountain range crossing, especially in the Late Middle Ages following the Dohna Feud, when Dohna lost its position to Pirna. However, this approach probably did not go via Zehista, but ran somewhat to the east via the plateau at Kohlberg and then reached Dohma before following the eastern route thereafter.

In addition to these major arteries, there was a multitude of branch routes, e. g.

- from Breitenau via Fürstenwalde, Müglitz and Ebersdorf to Chlumec,
- from Herbergen via Göppersdorf to Börnersdorf or
- from Gottleuba via Hellendorf and Petrovice to Nakléřov.

These transport corridors were upgraded with the arrival of more modern modes of transport. For example, the Old and New Dresden to Teplitz Post Road. But even the present-day roads use these corridors, for example the A 17 motorway.

== Chronology ==
The location of some of the highways outlined above can be worked out even for prehistoric times. This is evinced, inter alia, by archaeological finds (pottery, coins, even from Roman times, tools, weapons) from the Bronze (ca. 1800-750 BC) and Iron Age (750 BC - early AD). Even a few finds from the Neolithic (Stone Age ca 4500-1800 BC) show statistically significant associations with the above-described routes of the Kulmer Steig.

In the Middle Ages, the route served as a trading and military road. According to tradition, the Kulmer Steig was used as early as 805 and 856 by armies advancing into Bohemia. The first records of such use, however, date to 1040, when Margrave Eckhard II of Meissen with the Saxon army and a force under Archbishop Bardo of Mainz advanced into Bohemia and intervened in the dispute between Henry III and Bretislaus I The eastward expansion of Henry I may also have followed this route, especially since he also credited with the establishment of Dohna Castle in 930 (other sources identify Otto I as founding it around 960, perhaps this is a misunderstanding with regard to the castle on the Robisch and the Reichsburg opposite on the Schlossberg). It is recorded that Henry I founded Meissen Castle in 929 and in the same year moved on to Bohemia. Other armies were moved down this route by Wiprecht of Groitzsch in 1107 and Emperor Lothair III in 1126.

These transport routes also played an important role in the great wars of the Middle Ages. Armies in the Thirty Years' War, the Seven Years' War and during the wars of liberation from Napoleonic occupation, particularly around the year 1813, used these routes for crossing the Ore Mountains and regularly brought death, misery and devastation to the region.

With the introduction of road tolls in the 14th century and also the construction of post roads in the 18th century and modern roads since the early 19th century, the old road system described above, with its sunken roads shaped by centuries of heavy carts, disappeared.

In the later Middle Ages, these trade routes increasingly concentrated on the post roads (e.g. the Old and New Dresden to Teplitz Post Road) with their surveys and designations made by Adam Friedrich Zürner in 1712/13 on behalf of the Saxon Elector August the Strong.

The modern road network emerged in the 19th and 20th century. It is based, as mentioned above, on the described routes of the Kulmer Steig (e.g. Staatstraße 173 from Pirna to the border crossing at Bahratal; Kreisstraße 8760 from Pirna to Herbergen; Kreisstraße 8770 from Dohna via Köttewitz into the Seidewitz valley, Staatstraße 176 from Pirna through the Seidewitz valley to Liebstadt and on to Börnersdorf and Breitenau, and, of course, the A 17 autobahn, which runs parallel to the Old Dresden to Teplitz Post Road, etc.).

== See also ==
- Steig

== Sources ==
- Simon, Klaus und Hauswald, Knut: Der Kulmer Steig vor dem Mittelalter. Zu den ältesten sächsisch-böhmischen Verkehrswegen über das Osterzgebirge. In: Arbeits- und Forschungsberichte zur sächsischen Bodendenkmalpflege. Hrsg.: Landesamt für Archäologie Sachsen mit Landesmuseum für Vorgeschichte, Dresden. Bd. 37/1995, Theis, Stuttgart, S. 9–98 (früher im Deutschen Verlag der Wissenschaften, Berlin. Aufnahme nach Bd. 35/1992) ISBN 3-8062-1180-9, ISSN 0402-7817
- M. Ruttkowski: Altstraßen im Erzgebirge; Archäologische Denkmalinventarisation Böhmische Steige. in: Arbeits- und Forschungsberichte zur sächsischen Bodendenkmalpflege, Band 44, 2002 ISBN 3-910008-52-6
