= Saxon milepost =

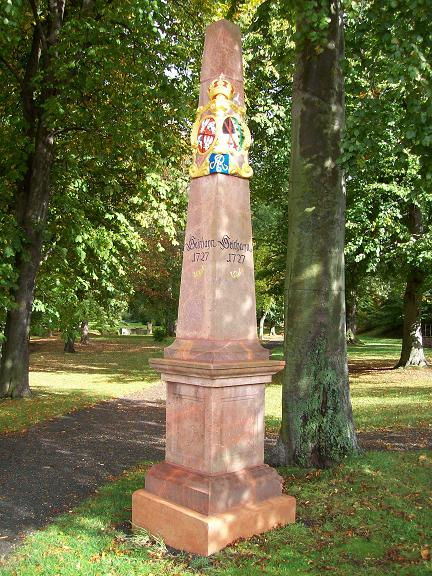
One of the two postal mileposts in Geithain, in front of the Lower Gate (Untertor) in the municipal park

A Saxon milepost (German: kursächsische Postmeilensäule, colloquially sächsische Postmeilensäule or Postsäule) was a milepost in the former Electorate of Saxony that gave distances expressed as journey times to the nearest eighth of an hour. With one hour being the equivalent of one league, this corresponds to a distance of about 566 m. The design of the mileposts varied according to the distance at which they were placed. They were hewn from natural stone into the shape of an obelisk, an ancient herma or a stele. Their prototype was the Roman milepost. From its German name römische Meilensäule the rather inaccurate German description of Säule (lit.: "column") was derived. The Saxon head postal director (Oberpostdirektor), Paul Vermehren, brought about their inception based on official distance surveys, whose results were given in leagues on the post mileposts. A league in Saxony at that time (1722 to 1840) was meant to be an hour's journey, equivalent to half a mile or 4.531 kilometres.

Saxon postal mileposts were set up during the reign of August the Strong and his successor along all important postal and trading routes and in almost all towns in the Electorate of Saxony to indicate the official distances. This was intended to be the basis for the creation of a unified calculation of postal charges. Because the territory of the Electorate of Saxony was larger than that of the present-day German state of Saxony, these mileposts are nowadays also found in the states of Thuringia, Brandenburg and Saxony-Anhalt, as well as in Poland.

The locations and images of surviving or replaced Saxon mileposts may be seen in the Gallery of Saxon postal mileposts.

== Forerunners ==
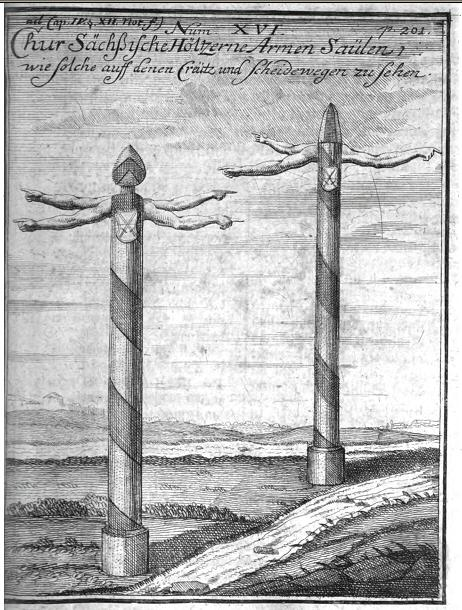
Wooden Saxon mileposts ("Chur-Sächßische Hölzerne Armen Säulen")

In 1695, the head of the Saxon post office, Oberpostmeister Ludwig Wilhelm, proposed a systematic survey of the road from Leipzig to Dresden with wooden, roadside posts at regular intervals. This prompted prince elector Augustus the Strong, on 18 June 1695, to order "that certain mileposts are to be erected". He charged the Kondukteur (building supervisor) Heinrich Niedhart with this task. The Electoral Saxon forestry superintendents were instructed to provide the wood, and the administrators of the electoral Saxon districts were to ensure that the posts were erected.

Furthermore, before 1700 wooden fingerposts with distance markings (so-called Arm(en)säulen or "arm columns") were commonplace on the roads of Saxony. These consisted of a wooden post, at the upper end of which were direction indicators in the shape of human arms and hands. Because the wood rotted rapidly as a result of its constant exposure to moisture, many of these fingerposts collapsed a few years after they had been erected and became unusable.

The establishment of postal mileposts in electoral Saxony was not an isolated phenomenon. Similar posts or stones with distances marked on them were erected along the roads in a number of countries.

== State survey by Zürner ==
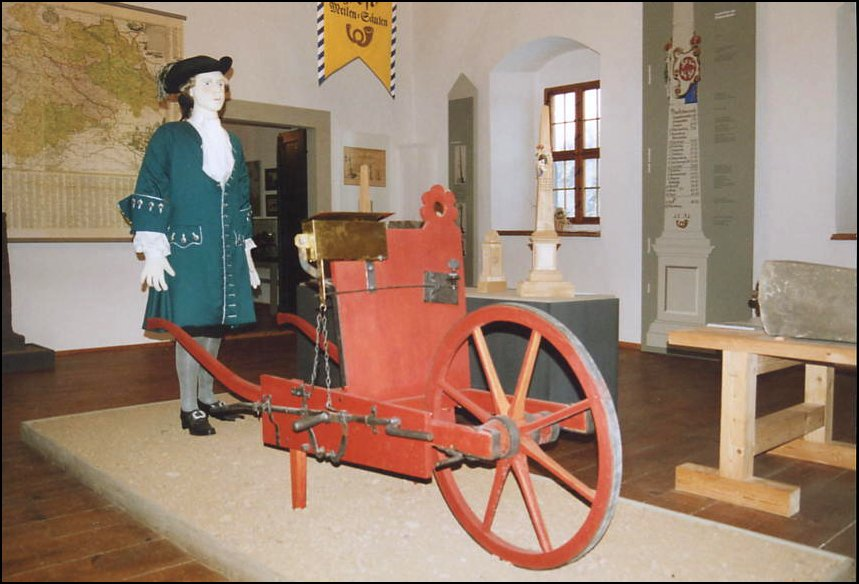
Working replica of a surveying cart (Messkarre) for road surveying in the Eastern Ore Mountain Museum at Lauenstein Castle

The basis for the introduction of Saxon mileposts was the cartographic work of the pastor, Adam Friedrich Zürner, from Skassa. Zürner had prepared a map of Großenhain, which attracted the attention of Augustus the Strong. After further cartographic work, the prince elector gave him the task on 12 April 1713 of: "recording districts, including the lordships, manor estates, towns, villages and the like, on geographic maps" (original: "Aemter samt denen darinnen befindlichen Herrschaften, Rittergütern, Städten, Dörfern und dergleichen mehr in mappas geographicas bringen"). This entailed the topographic survey of Electoral Saxony. In addition to the heartland, it covered the electoral Saxon parts of the counties of Henneberg and Mansfeld, the Schönburg estates, the estates of the Albertine branches of Saxe-Merseburg, Saxe-Weissenfels and Saxe-Zeitz as well as the two Lusatias.

The resulting cartographic material remained largely secret for several decades for military reasons. The prince elector only had an improved postal map published which was the result of an extension to the contract that followed a few weeks later. This "Chur-Sächsische Post-Charte", first published in 1718, and its subsequent editions, remained in use until the 19th century.

Because the distances stated at that time were frequently based on imprecise estimates, Zürner had to survey the distances afresh or verify existing data. To achieve that he designed a survey vehicle in the shape of an electoral Saxon baggage coach. Each revolution of the rear wheel of the coach with a circumference of one Dresden rod (Dresdner Rute), i.e. 4.531 metres, was transmitted to a mechanical counter in the coach by means of a chain. Zürner's assistants used a measuring cart in the shape of a wheelbarrow for those tracks unsuitable for a coach, which likewise measured the distances by the turning of a wheel and which was carried as the so-called "fifth wheel on the wagon" (fünftes Rad am Wagen) in a case on the surveying coach. Both methods enabled a very accurate survey of roads.

Known locations of postal mileposts on a map of the Kingdom of Saxony before the Vienna Congress, whose area of interest coincided largely with that of Electoral Saxony in 1814/15

Another problem was the lack of standard units of measurement. At that time there were miles (Meilen) of various length even within the Electorate. To achieve standardization, the Electoral Saxon post mile was therefore introduced on 17 March 1722, whereby 1 mile = 2 leagues = 2,000 Dresden rods = 9.062 kilometres. To indicate distances on the mileposts, Zürner used the league (Wegstunde), which equalled a half mile.

The survey journeys usually began in Leipzig or Dresden, the counter being set to zero at the posthouse in each city. As a result, a Leipzig or a Dresden distance is quoted. During such a journey, the assistant to the surveyor had to drive a numbered wooden stake into the ground every quarter of a mile and dig a hole next to it. The excavated material was then used to help fix the wooden post securely. The landowner was responsible for looking after the survey stake.

In several cases the surveys were also conducted outside the territory of the electorate. Anywhere Saxon land was interrupted by other territories, roads used by the Saxon post office were surveyed, with the permission of the territorial owner.

Surveying was especially difficult in Upper Lusatia because landowners of the estates of the realm there tried to impede Zürner's activity. Zürner was able to begin surveying Upper and Lower Lusatia only on 29 June 1723. The survey work on the most important roads in the state was completed by 1733.

== Erection of the columns ==
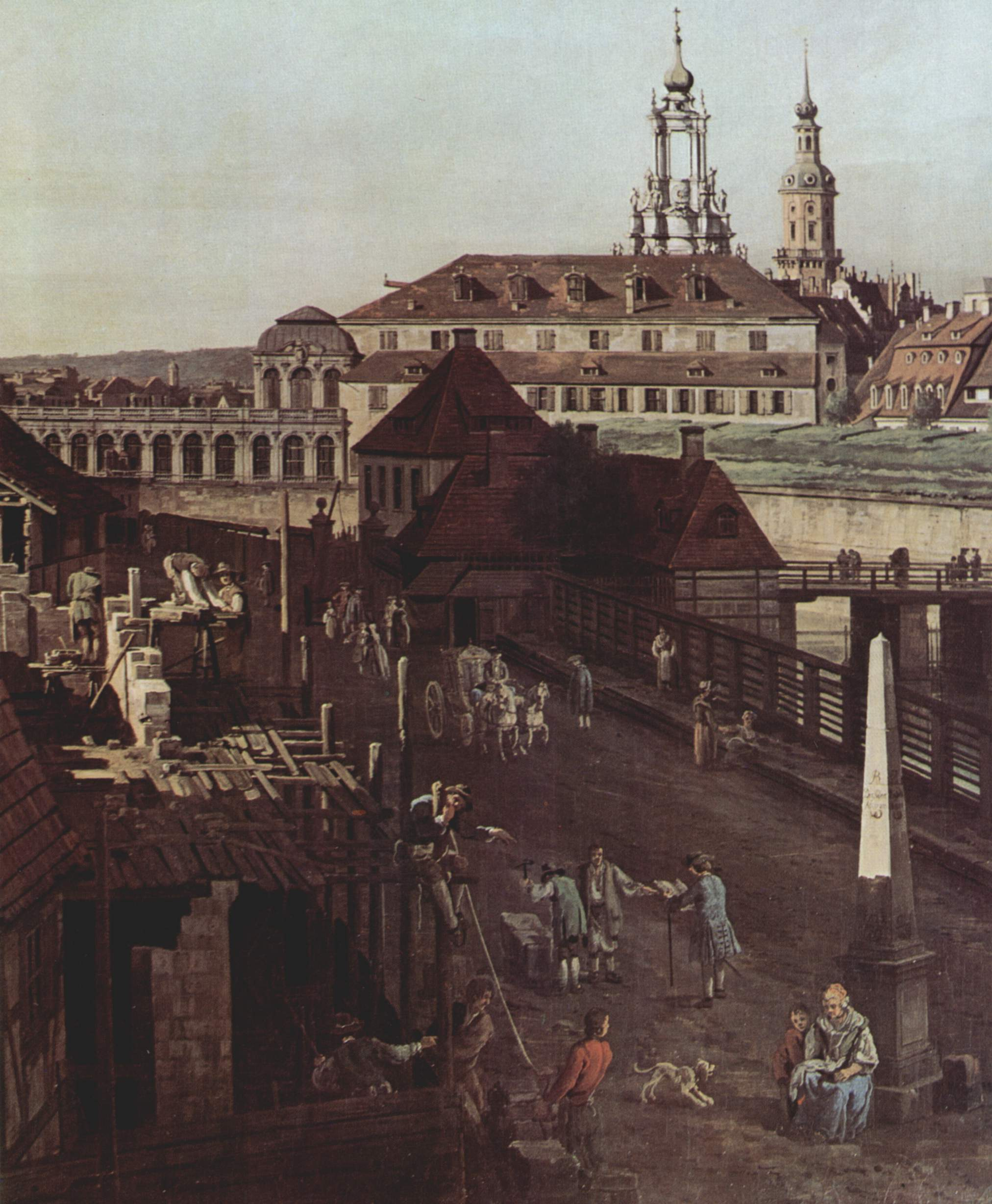
Bernardo Bellotto: view of Dresden (detail); the moats and bridge between the Wilschem Gate and the template post milepost (without coat of arms) by Matthäus Daniel Pöppelmann, ca. 1750

On 19 September 1721, an Electoral order was issued to the districts (Ämter) of Dresden, Meißen and Großenhain, to erect stone columns as mileposts. On 1 November 1721, this order was extended to the entire state. On the same day the state authorities in charge issued the general ordinance for the "Establishment of Stone Postal Columns" (Setzung der steinernen Post-Säulen) and the instruction that the costs of erecting them were to be borne by the landowner of the locations affected. For Upper Lusatia, a separate instruction followed on 24 November 1721.

Zürner, who had been tasked by Augustus the Strong on 14 December 1721, worked out himself the details of which mileposts were to be erected. Zürner set forth that a large distance column (Distanzsäule) was to be erected immediately in front of the gates of a town. Similarly there were to be quarter-mile, half-mile and whole-mile stones at the corresponding intervals. In the Saxon part of the County of Henneberg cast iron posts were erected instead of the usual stone columns, and in the County of Mansfeld there were no mileposts at all.

Originally about 300 distance mileposts and around 1,200 other roadside mileposts were erected. About 200 of them have at least partly survived or have been faithfully reconstructed. Replicas were increasingly made after 1990.

Today the Saxon section of the Old Dresden to Teplitz Post Road is considered the historic transport link with the most surviving postal mileposts.

The material used for the mileposts in Saxony varies widely. They were usually made from the prevailing building stone of the local area, which is also reflected in the building materials used in Saxony's architecture in general. Elbe sandstone from several quarries in Saxon Switzerland and the area of the Tharandt Forest was used for most of the stones. Other frequently used materials were Rochlitz porphyry in Central Saxony and Lusatian granite in eastern Saxony. In the Chemnitz area, Hilbersdorf porphyritic tuff quarried at Hilbersdorf and Flöha was used as a milepost material In the upper Ore Mountains and the Vogtland mileposts were made of local granite, for example, Wiesenbad Granite, granite of the Greifensteine area, Schwarzenberg Granite, Kirchberg Granite or Bad Brambach Granite of the "Fichtel Mountains type". The different weathering properties of these diverse types of stone proves to be a challenge for the conservation of these monuments in many cases. This is also the reason why numerous mileposts no longer exist.

== Opposition ==
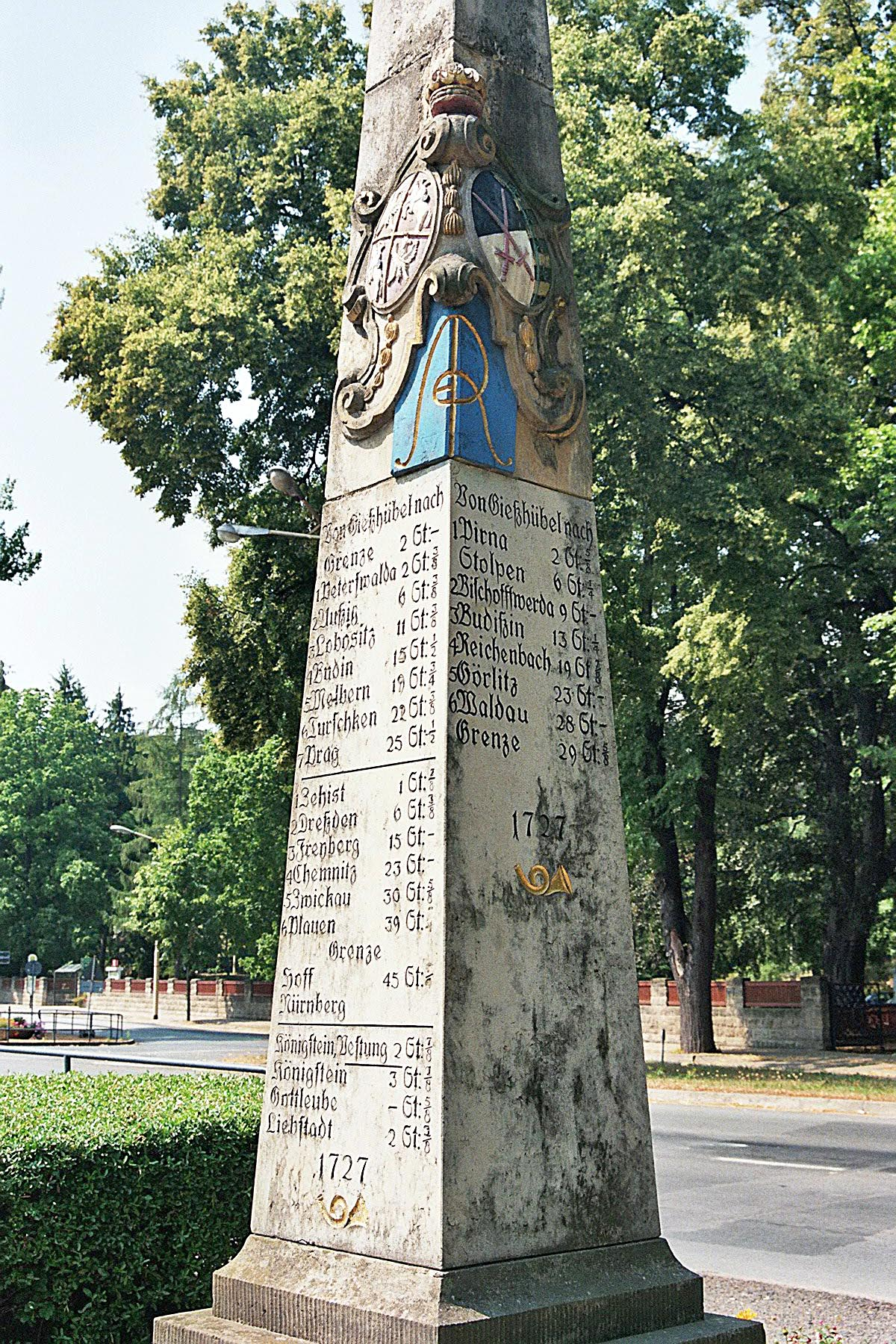
Coat of arms and inscription block of the distance milespost in Berggießhübel

Both the costs and the responsibility for erecting the mileposts had to be borne by the authorities of the respective towns and villages. As a result, the measures did not gain universal approval throughout the land. Because the means of the towns varied considerably depending on their size and industrial structure, the financial impact on them was very variable. Regardless of their size, they often had a similar number of town gates and therefore a comparable number of milestone columns to put up. Frequently there were three to five gates. In 1722, the Saxon Landtag asked the prince elector to cancel the expensive project that had invoked the opposition of many town councils and landowners. Many towns tried to ignore the edict or delay its implementation.

In order to enforce the implementation of his instructions, the elector had resort to harsh measures and threatened negligence, tardiness or damage to the mileposts with disciplinary action in an order of 24 July 1722; and in another edict of 7 September 1724, fines of 20 talers were imposed against every official guilty of missing deadlines and in each individual case of neglect. Especially on the roads of Central Saxony, in the towns of Colditz, Grimma, Oschatz, Rochlitz and Waldheim, as well as the routes from these towns to Leipzig and thence Zeitz the gaps were particularly noticeable and were, in a decree of 7 September, subject to public reprimand by the prince elector.

In the course of this dispute, many places strove to erect one milepost column only. Zürner knew the location of many small towns and villages very precisely. During the course of his project, he proceeded to support the towns in their requests and advocated the elector's consent. In many cases their requests were granted. On the national roads, therefore, only wooden mileposts were erected or existing ones repaired. After 1727 the practice of erecting one column per town was carried out in many cases.

As the order dated 19 September 1721 incorporated a comprehensive memorandum of 24 items and was accompanied by a list of the benefits of the regulation, it appears that problems had been anticipated from the outset. For example, as advantages of the national survey, the memorandum called pointed out that the payment of "delivery men, relay services, postal items and other goods" would be verifiable and the prices could no longer be fixed arbitrarily, that there would be fewer complaints from travellers about high fees that had hitherto taken up the time of courts and higher authorities, and that journey times and delivery times would be precisely defined by the survey. Another argument was that the roads would be more easily recognisable in the winter and at night.

Opposition to the postal mileposts was especially strong in Upper Lusatia. In 1723, the town councils of Bautzen and Görlitz refused to entertain Zürner in this matter. Not until 31 March 1724 did the estates of Upper Lusatia declare themselves ready to carry out the instructions.

Because mileposts were occasionally damaged or even knocked down, an order was issued in 1724 that such crimes would be punished by imprisonment and other "hard and exemplary punishments".

Due to persistent opposition the Saxon Landtage was finally able to issue a decree on 12 April 1728 that - contrary to the Elector's wishes - the mileposts need only be erected on main and postal roads.

== Design ==
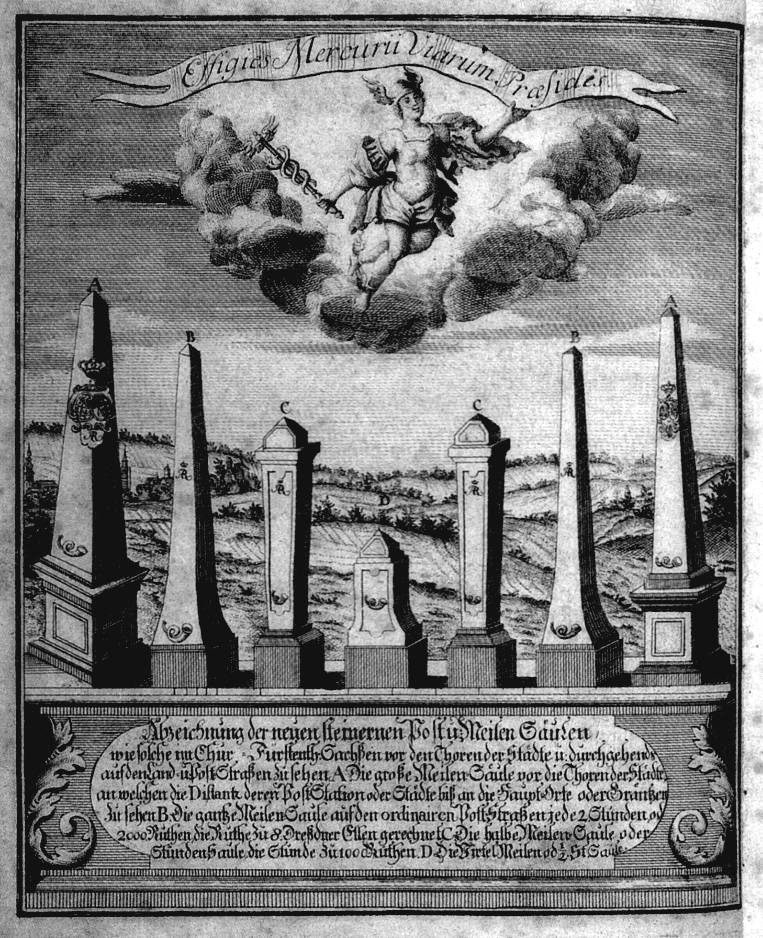
View of the types of milepost, 1747

To what extent Augustus the Strong was personally involved in the development of the designs for the mileposts is not clear. Their final appearance, which was based on baroque and classical prototypes, was linked to the senior state architect (Oberlandesbaumeister), Matthäus Daniel Pöppelmann.

=== Distance mileposts ===
The large distance mileposts (Distanzsäule) comprised seven elements. The pedestal was formed by the plinth, dado and cornice (or cap). The column consists of the base (Zwischenplatte or Schaftfuß), the shaft, a block sowing the coat of arms (Wappenstück), and the finial (Aufsatz or Spitze). The columns have an average height of 8 ells (4.53 metres) and rest on a pedestal half an ell high. The individual elements were held together by means of iron pegs cast in lead. On the shaft of the column the names of the destinations were inscribed at Zürner's direction in a Fraktur font and based on the distance tables that had been worked out for each town. Several routes crossed state borders, and this was indicated by the letters gr (for Grenze or "border") or a horizontal line. Part of the inscription on all columns was a post horn on all four sides, which was the emblem of the state's postal sovereignty. The arms of the Electorate of Saxony with a gilded crown and the Polish royal crown with the royal Polish-Lithuanian coat of arms were shown on the superstructure.

The mileposts originally erected in front of the town gates usually had the distances marked on two sides and the names of the destination towns on the other two sides. Later columns, erected in the market squares, had the distances marked on all four sides.

=== Full mile stone ===
The full mile stone (Ganzmeilensäule) was to mark every full mile along the post road. It is about 3.75 metres high and resembles the large distance milepost in shape. They are however more slender and have no section showing the coat of arms. The information was inscribed on two sides so that travellers in both directions could read them. On the road side was the so-called serial number (Reihennummer) with which all roadside columns and mileposts were numbered in sequence. Because a number was assigned every quarter of a mile, each full-milepost had a serial number divisible by four.

=== Half mile stone ===
The half mile stone (Halbmeilensäule), also called the league post (Stundensäule) because the league corresponded to half a mile, had a lower pedestal surmounted by a shaft that tapered from top to bottom. A roof-shaped, chamfered finial formed the uppermost element. Its total height is about 3 metres. It bore the same inscriptions as the full mile stone. The herm-like design of this column is a reason why only a few stones of this type have survived until today. The serial number is even, but not divisible by four.

=== Quarter mile stone ===
The quarter mile stone (Viertelmeilenstein) rests on a low pedestal and consists of a rectangular column or stele. Its total height is about 1.7 metres. There are no inscriptions on these mileposts other than the monogram "AR", a post horn symbol, the year of manufacture and, on the narrow side facing the road, the serial number which was an odd number.

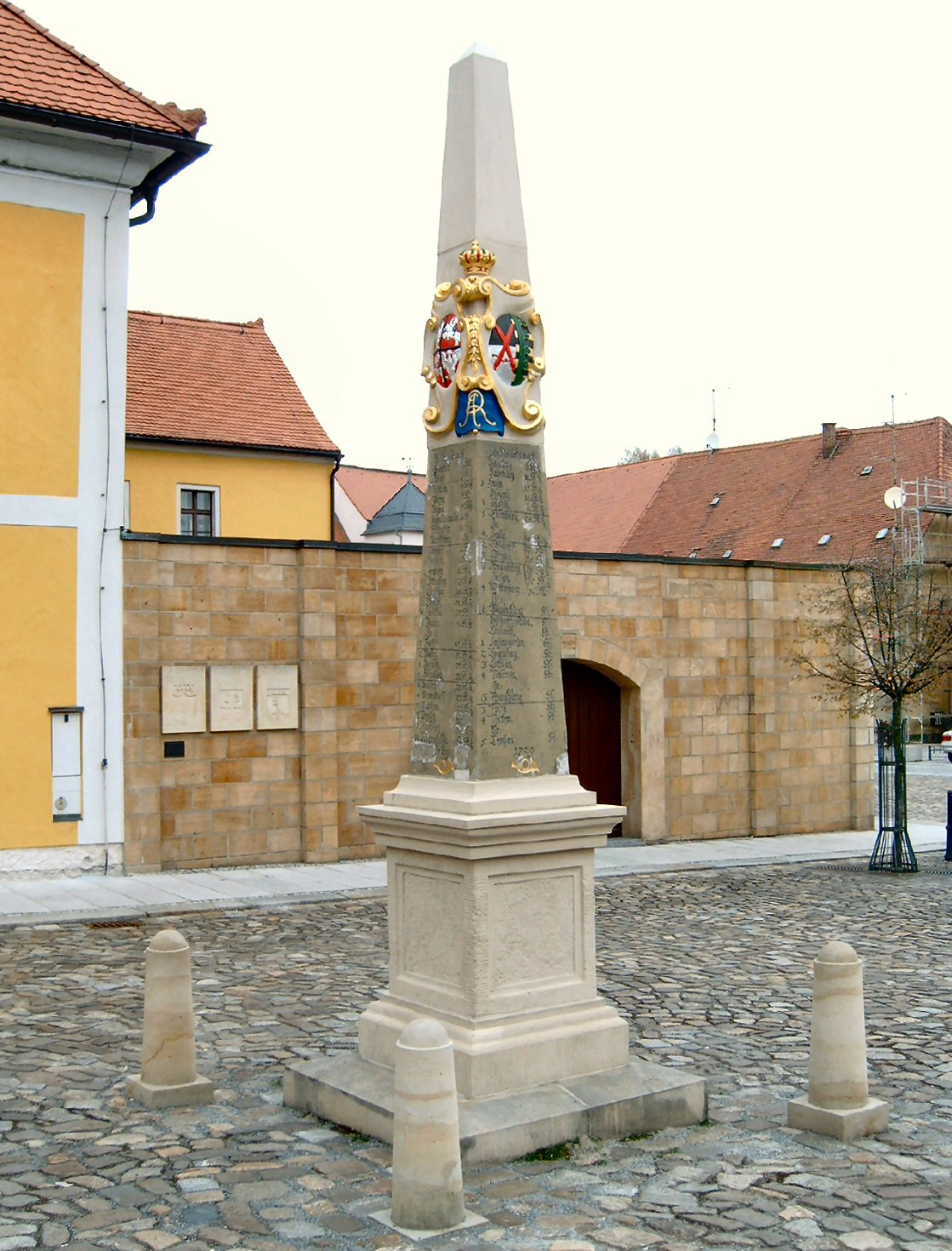
Distance milepost on the market square at Neustadt in Sachsen

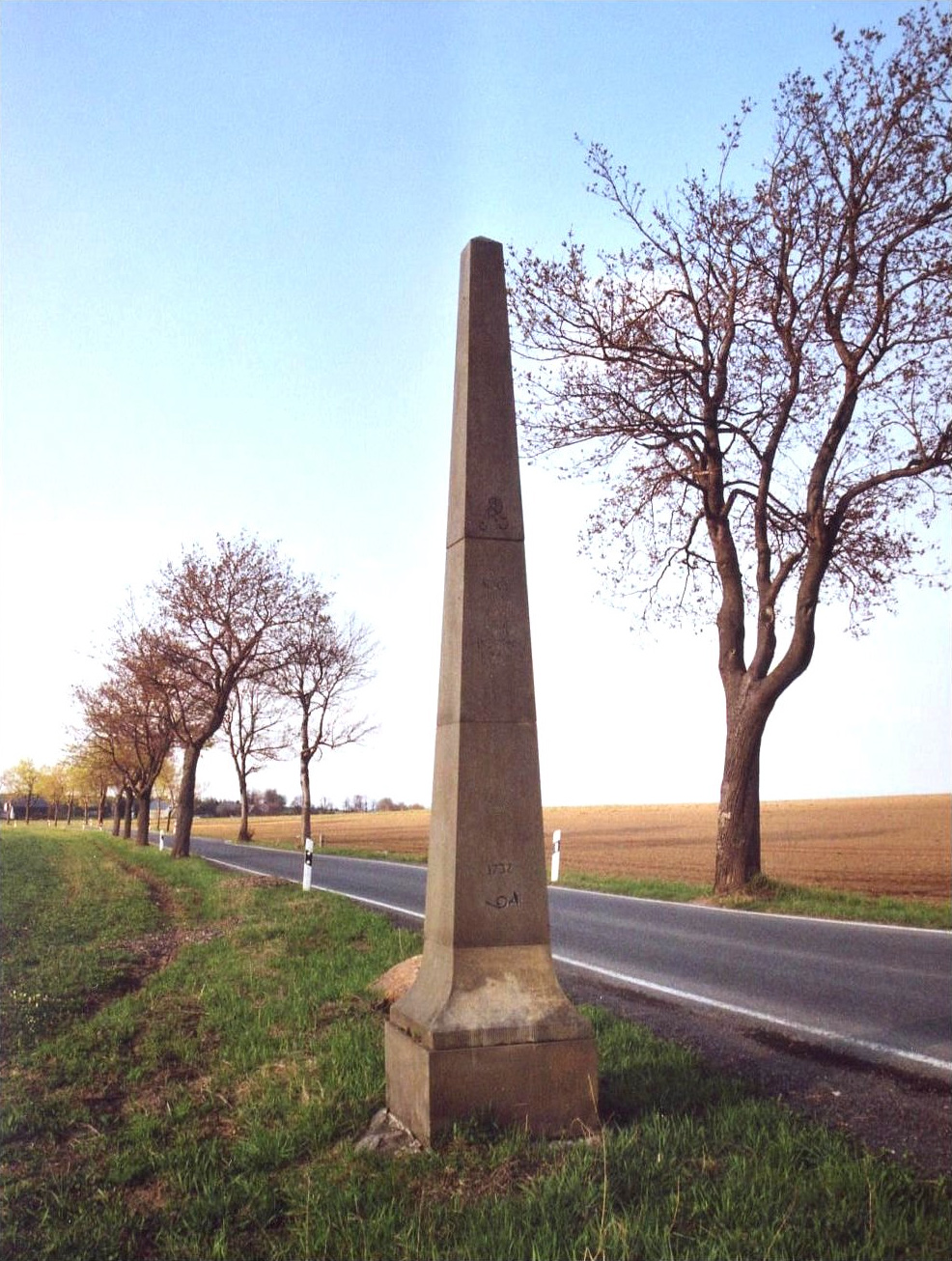
Full-mile post on the Old Dresden to Teplitz Post Road near Breitenau

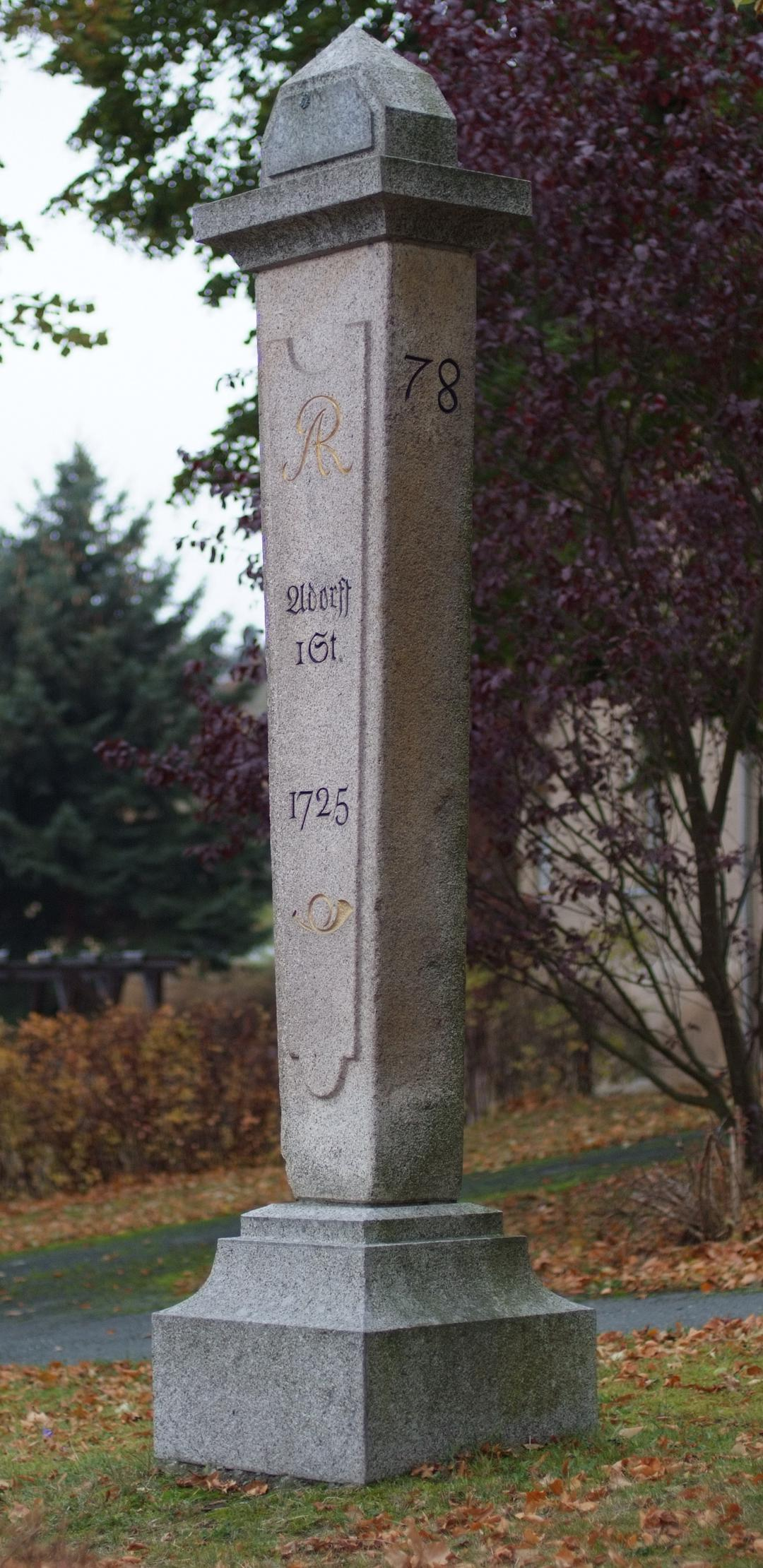
Half-mile post in Markneukirchen

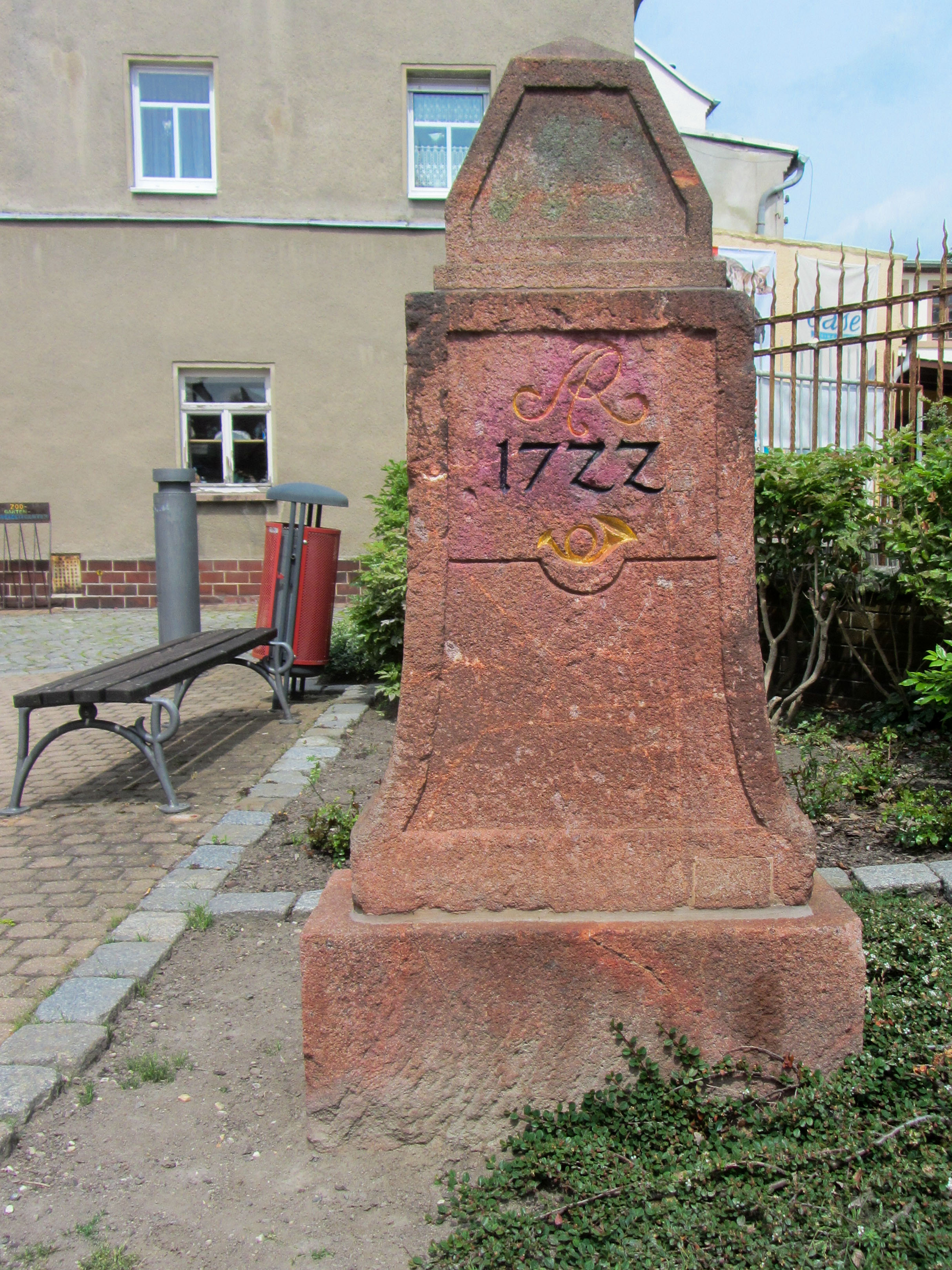
Quarter-milestone in Bad Lausick

== Successors ==
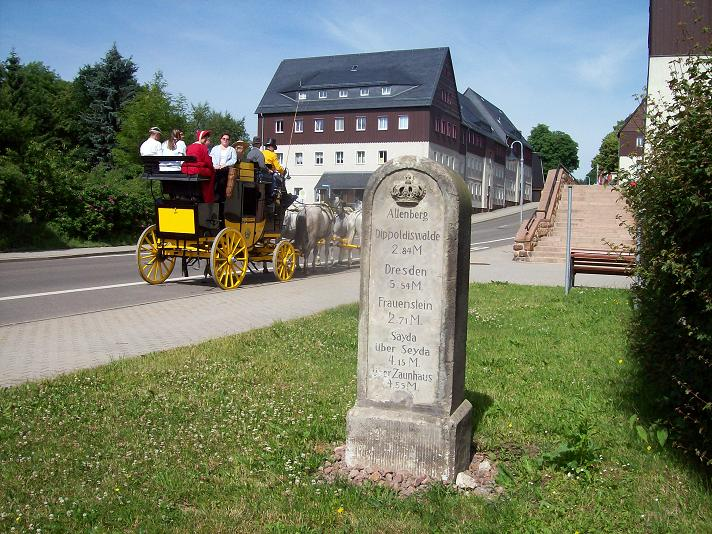
Royal Saxon station stone in Altenberg

Preparations for the introduction of the metric system in the Kingdom of Saxony were made as part of the work of the Standardization Commission (Normalaichungscommission), led by Albert Christian Weinlig and Julius Ambrosius Hülße. These two men envisaged a transition phase from the old units. Almost simultaneously, similar efforts were being made at the level of the German Confederation. A new survey was carried out in 1858, and between 1859 and 1865 a new system of milestones – the Royal Saxon milestones were made in the shape of station milestones (Stationssteine), full mile, half mile, junction (Abzweig-) and border crossing stones (Grenzübergangssteine), noting that, from 1840, 1 mile = 7.5 km. Upon the full introduction of the metric system around 1900, some of these were converted to kilometer, chaussee, boundary (Flurgrenz) and roadkeeper stones (Straßenwärtersteine).
