= Bohemian track =

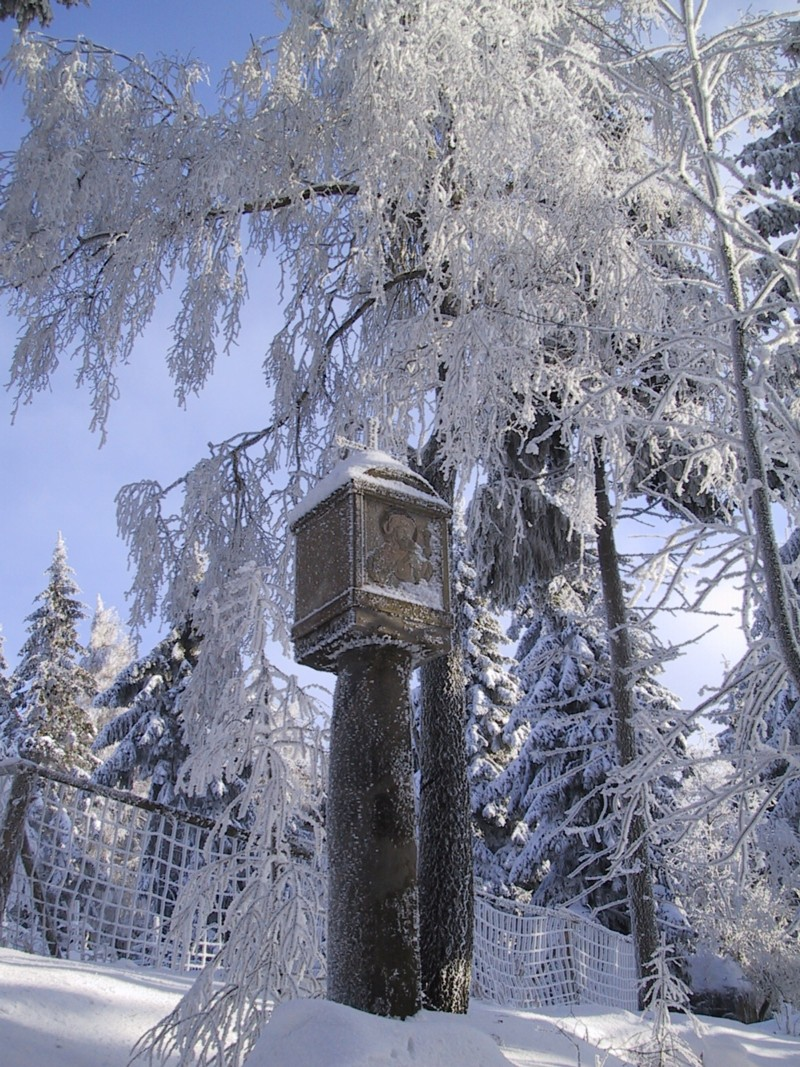
On the Old Prague Road (Alte Prager Straße) in the Lusatian Mountains

A Bohemian track (German: Böhmischer Steig, Czech: Česká stezka) or Bohemian way (Böhmweg) refers to various communication routes over the ridges of the Vogtland, the Ore Mountains, the Elbe Sandstone Mountains and the Lusatian Mountains, which linked the region of the March of Meissen and Upper Lusatia with Bohemia from the late 11th century. In 1118 there is the first indirect reference to the existence of such a link in a document in which there is mention of a customs post in the vicinity of the present-day town of Zwickau.

The first direct reference is in 1143 when a document records a semita bohemica that ran from Altenburg via Waldenburg and Zschopau to Bohemia. Another reference appears in 1185. In the description of the border of the territory of Altzella Abbey we read: " ... ab illo per antiquam Boemie semitam ...". This was a route that went from Waldheim via Sayda and the saddle near Deutscheinsiedel to Most (now Brüx). Colloquially many of these Bohemian trails were also called salt roads. One example ran from Leipzig past present-day Neuhausen and over the Deutscheinsiedler Saddle towards Prague.

== See also ==
- Ore Mountain passes
- Salt trade

== Literature ==
- Andreas Gerth (2008), Der Böhmische Steig, Auf den Spuren eines alten Handelsweges von Bautzen nach Prag; eine Wanderung der besonderen Art. (in German), Oberlausitzer Verlag Frank Nürnberger, ISBN 978-3-933827-87-6
