= Ore Mountain passes =

Crossings and passages over the Ore Mountains

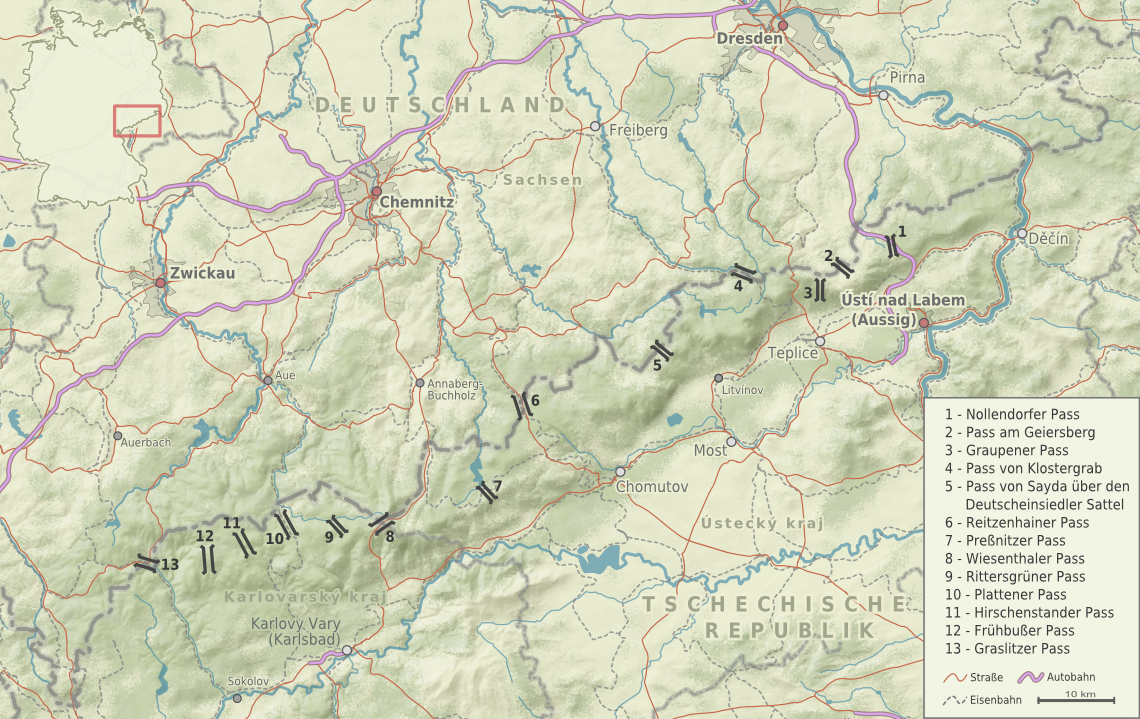
Historic passes over the Ore Mountains

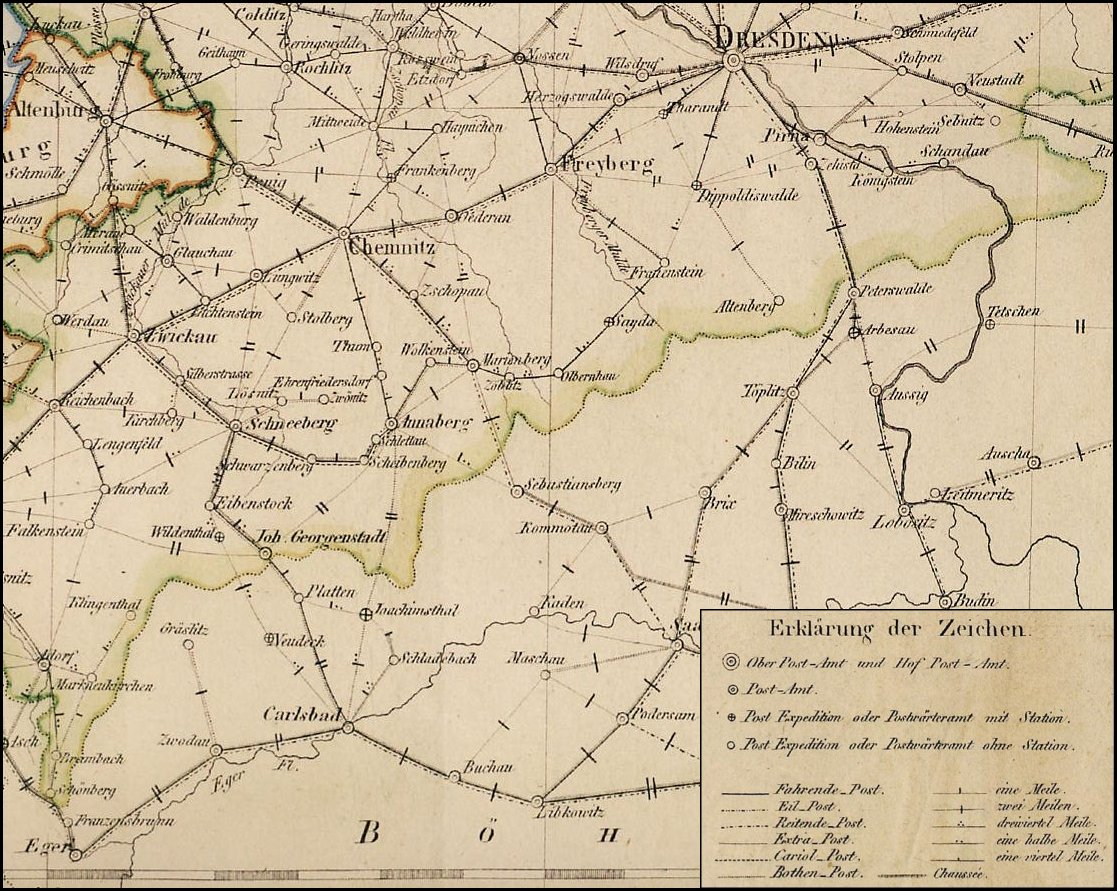
Post roads over the Ore Mountains (1825)

The Ore Mountain passes (German: Erzgebirgspässe) are crossings and passages over the crest of the Ore Mountains in Central Europe, over which tracks, roads, railway lines and pipelines run from the Free State of Saxony in the Federal Republic of Germany to Bohemia in the Czech Republic and vice versa.

== Upper Ore Mountains from a transport perspective ==
The shape of the terrain and the climate are the most important physical-geographic conditions that exert an influence on the course and the design of routes across the Ore Mountains, even today. Geomorphologically, the mountains form a fault block, sharply uplifted in the south and sloping gradually away to the north. The appearance of the mountains in the Saxon part is characterised less by their absolute height, but by deep and sometimes winding valleys that have cut notches up to 200 metres deep into the terrain. The area between the valleys comprises gently rolling plateaus that from an early time enabled favourable transportation routes to be developed, often with gentle inclines. In fact such communications only became a problem where one of the deep valleys had to be crossed. Significantly less easy to negotiate, however, is the steep descent to the south towards Bohemia, where the Ore Mountains drop up to 700 metres in less than 10 kilometres. Even today, the upgraded transit roads in this section have gradients of over 10%.

The Ore Mountain crest itself forms a series of plateaus and individual peaks, interrupted by saddles. From the Vogtland the ridge climbs to about 1,000 metres in height and then falls to about 900 metres near Johanngeorgenstadt (Platten Pass). The ridge rises again to the Fichtelberg/Klínovec (Keilberg) summits that are over 1,200 metres high. Between the two mountains, the crest sinks down to the Wiesenthal Pass at 1,080 metres. By Deutscheinsiedler Saddle, the lowest crossing over the mountains, the ridgeline drops by 750 metres to the Reitzenhain Pass (820 m). To the north-east the crest reaches 900 metres again at the Kahleberg before descending to about 500 metres to the Elbe Sandstone Mountains.

Due to the lack of a water gap through the mountains, the mountain passes are relatively high. Thus, the middle ridge of the Ore Mountains is about 880 metres high and the average saddle height is only slightly lower at 810 metres. Because the fault block is uplifted on one side along the Eger trough and the border diverges away from the ridge line, the Ore Mountains reach their greatest height on the Bohemian side. Thus most of the passes are already in Bohemia. They reach an average altitude of 700–900 m above sea level. The highest pass, at 1,083 m above sea level, is the Wiesenthal Pass. The lowest-lying is the Nollendorf Pass at 680 m.

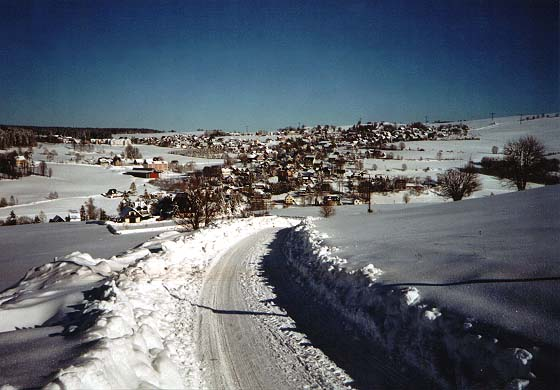
Winter road conditions in the Upper Ore Mountains near Breitenbrunn

On the upper slopes of the Ore Mountains the climate may quite clearly be described as harsh. For that reason, the Upper Ore Mountains was also referred to in the past as Saxon Siberia. The annual rainfall on the high ridges is up to over 1,100 millimetres, with the majority falling as snow. The annual average temperatures reach values of only 3 to 5 °C. At Oberwiesenthal, located 922 m above sea level, there are on average only about 140 frost-free days a year. These winter temperatures and snowfalls during the winter months, especially on the mountain passes, lead to traffic problems, congestion and closures, even today. According to reports by historians in the past, winters in previous centuries in the upper Ore Mountain regions must have been even harder than today. Prolonged periods of frost and continuous snow cover, metre-high snowdrifts and snow storms often made roads and passes impassable for weeks. Reports by the State Post Office on the road to the mining town of Sayda on the Deutscheinsiedler Saddle dated February 1855, state that "... because of the immense masses of snow, progress [is] almost impossible, just as impossible are the conditions during snowfalls". Post had to be transported by sledge and messengers, because "two horses side by side cannot not wade through the piles of snow".

Mention should also be made of the danger of flooding during the snow melts in summer and thunderstorms. Floods have occurred repeatedly in the past, most recently in August 2002, when considerable destruction was caused to access roads in the valleys to the Ore Mountain passes.

== Nakléřov Pass ==
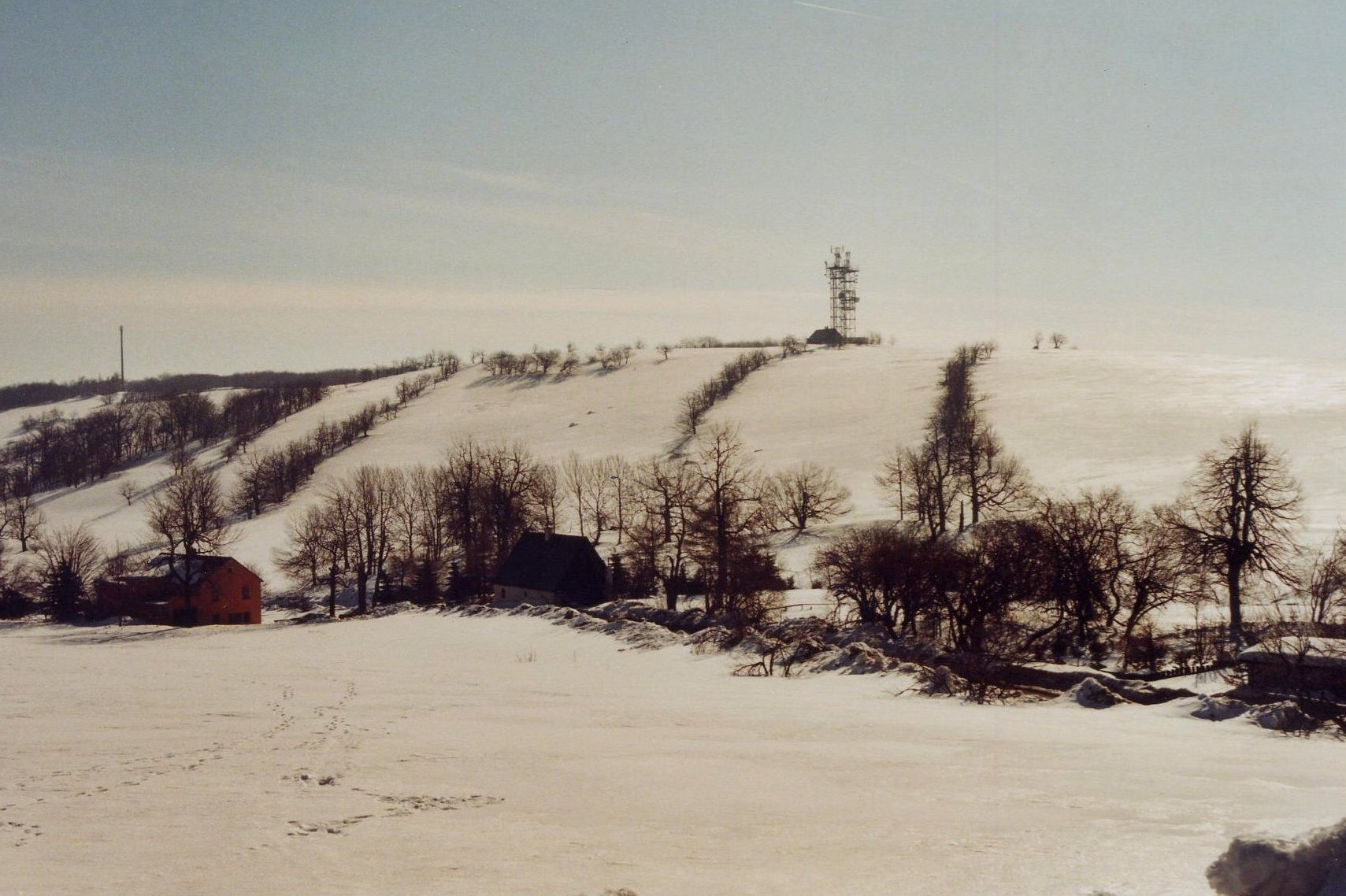
On the Nollendorf Höhe mountain

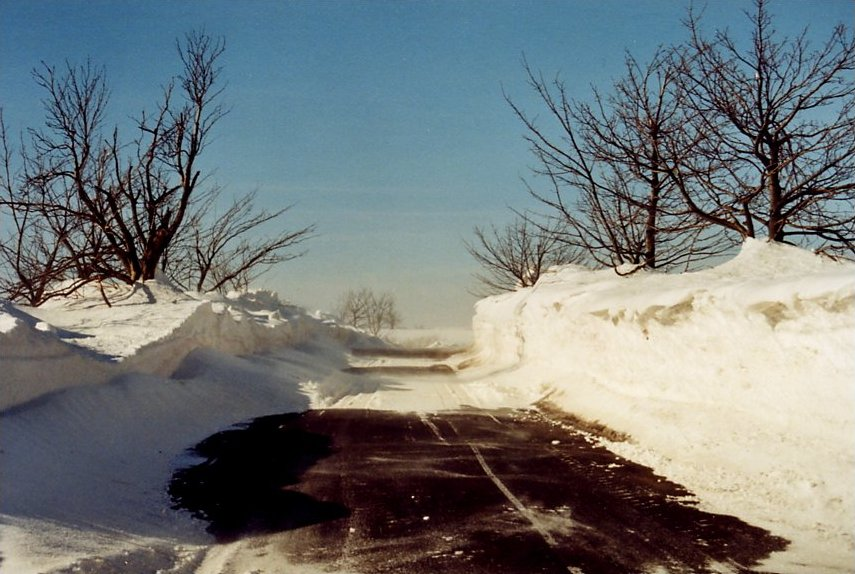
Winter at the Nollendorf Pass

One route variation of the Kulmer Steig ran over the Nakléřov Pass in the eastern Ore Mountains. The old road crossed the Saxon-Bohemian border from Fürstenwalde in the west to Oelsen in the east and ran down the steep escarpment of the Ore Mountains into the Bohemian Chlumec u Chabařovic and on into the interior of the Kingdom of Bohemia.

The Kulmer Steig was reportedly being used in the 13th century. The pass became known as a result of the War of the Sixth Coalition and the Battle of Kulm and Nollendorf on 29 and 30 August 1813. In Berlin-Schöneberg, Nollendorfplatz and Nollendorfstraße are named after the small Ore Mountain village of Nakléřov (Nollendorf), of which nothing is left today of the church town that according to legend Napoleon watched the battle from. From 1913 to just after 1950 a 21 metre high observation tower stood on the Nakléřovská výšina, which bore the name Kaiserwarte and, after 1919, Carl Weis Warte.

The Nakléřov Pass has in recent history been the subject of both positive and negative headlines. In 1936 the Olympic Flame crossed the pass on its way from Athens to Berlin. A monument erected on the border at Bahratal recalls this. In 1968 the Red Army used the mountain crossing in order to suppress the Prague Spring reforms by invading Czechoslovakia.

== Literature (selection) ==
- Auer Beschäftigungsinitiative e. V. (Hrsg.): Informative und unterhaltsame Betrachtungen zur Verkehrsentwicklung im Westerzgebirge. Aue 2004.
- Autorenkollektiv: Lexikon kursächsische Postmeilensäulen. Berlin 1989.
- Adolf Böhm: Die ehemaligen Erzgebirgsquerbahnen. In: Mitteilungen des Landesvereins Sächsischer Heimatschutz, Heft 1/1995. Dresden 1995. p. 18–25.
- Ingolf Gräßler: Pässe über das Erzgebirge. Paßwege und Paßstraßen zwischen Freiberger und Zwickauer Mulde im Mittelalter. In: Rainer Aurig/Steffen Herzog/Simone Lässig (Hrsg.): Landesgeschichte in Sachsen. Tradition und Innovation. Dresden 1997, p. 97–108. ISBN 3-89534-210-6.
- Johannes Hemleben: Die Pässe des Erzgebirges. Diss. Berlin 1911.
- Albrecht Kirsche: Generationen der Fernwege über das Erzgebirge. in: Sächsische Heimatblätter Heft 4/2007, p. 311-321
- Gerhardt Müller: Die ältesten Wege in unserere Heimat. In: Bezirkslehrerverein Pirna (Hrsg.): Heimat. Jugendblätter zur Heimatkunde für die Sächsische Schweiz und Osterzgebirge. 4. Jahrgang. Heft Nr. 8. p. 60–62.
- Christian Preiß: Die Alte Teplitzer Poststraße. Vom vorgeschichtlichen Steig zur Autobahn des 21. Jahrhunderts. Pirna 2004 (Eigenverlag).
- Manfred Ruttkowski: Altstraßen im Erzgebirge. Archäologische Denkmalinventarisation Böhmische Steige. In: Arbeits- und Forschungsberichte zur sächsischen Bodendenkmalpflege 44, 2002, ISSN 0402-7817, p. 264-297.
- Sächsisches Institut für Straßenbau (Hrsg.): Die historische Entwicklung des Straßennetzes in Sachsen. Rochlitz 1997.
- Paul Schmidt: Die Straßen des Freistaates Sachsen, geographisch betrachtet. Diss. Borna/Leipzig 1935.
- Heinrich Schurtz: Die Pässe des Erzgebirges. Leipzig 1891.
- Hans Siegert: Die Pässe des Erzgebirges. In: Kalender für das Erzgebirge und das übrige Sachsen, 1920. p. 21–26.
- Arthur Speck: Die historisch-geographische Entwicklung des sächsischen Straßennetzes. Leipzig 1953.
- Tomáš Velímský/Eva Černá: Výsledky rekognoskace středověké cesty z Mostu do Freiburgu. In: Archaeologia historica 15, p. 477–487.
- H. Wiechel: Die ältesten Wege Sachsens. Sitzungsberichte der Naturwissenschaftlichen Gesellschaft Isis. Dresden 1901. (Digitalisat)
- R. Wißuwa: Die Entwicklung der Altstraßen im Gebiet des heutigen Bezirkes Karl-Marx-Stadt von der Mitte des 10. Jahrhunderts bis Mitte des 14. Jahrhunderts. Ein Beitrag zur Rekonstruktion des Altstraßennetzes auf archäologischer Grundlage. Dissertation (A)1987

== See also ==
- List of highest paved roads in Europe
- List of mountain passes
- Bohemian track
