= Jakob Ullmann =

German composer and university professor (born 1958)

Jakob Ullmann (born 12 July 1958 in Freiberg, East Germany) is a German composer and university professor. He is the son of theologian and politician Wolfgang Ullmann.

After refusing to undergo military service in East Germany, Ullmann worked as groundskeeper, boilerman and house painter from 1978 until 1982 in Dresden. From 1979 until 1982 he studied church music in Saxony. Being denied official enrollment in Berlin's Academy of Fine Arts, he studied composition privately with Friedrich Goldmann.

Since the early 1980s he has been working as a freelance composer and author of self-published writings, as well as teaching classes at different universities on New Music, mediaeval music, history of Byzantine music as well as music philosophy. His first major presentation in concert was in East Berlin in 1986, receiving positive reviews as well as a first official publishing deal for his string quartet's score in print. In 1988 a work by Ullmann saw its first performance in West Germany when Gruppe Neue Musik Hanns Eisler guested at the Donaueschingen Festival.

== Links ==
- www.jakob-ullmann.com – official website
- musikrat.de – biography and project description at German Music Council (in German)
- Profile at Hochschule für Musik Basel
- Interview by Georg-Friedrich Kühn (in German)
- Gisela Nauck: Der Komponist Jakob Ullmann - ein Portrait - Feature from: Neue Zeitschrift für Musik, 1/ 2002 (in German)
- Jakob Ullmann at Edition RZ
