= Wolfgang Ullmann =

German journalist, theologian, and politician (1929–2004)

- Ullmann in 1990

Member of the European Parliament for Germany
- In office 19 July 1994 – 20 July 1999

Member of the Bundestag
- In office 3 October 1990 – 16 October 1994
- Constituency: Saxony

Personal details
- Born: 18 August 1929 Bad Gottleuba-Berggießhübel, Saxony, Germany
- Died: 30 July 2004 (aged 74) Ore Mountains
- Party: The Greens
- Other political affiliations: Alliance 90 (1990–1993); Green Group (1994–1999)

Wolfgang Ullmann (18 August 1929 – 30 July 2004) was a German journalist, theologian, and politician.

== Life ==
Wolfgang Ullmann was born in Bad Gottleuba near Dresden. From 1948 to 1954 he studied Protestant theology and also philosophy, first in Berlin and then at the University of Göttingen.

Following graduation he returned to East Germany in 1954 and became minister in Colmnitz, Saxony. In 1963 he was appointed lecturer in Church History at Naumburg.

From 1978, he was lecturer in Church History at the training centre of the Eastern Region of the then divided Evangelical Church in Berlin-Brandenburg in East Berlin.

Protected by the Protestant Church in East Germany, opposition movements against the regime in the GDR formed and in 1987 Wolfgang Ullman became a member of one of these group, the "Initiative for the Refusal of Practice and Principle of the Demarcation".

After German reunification in 1990 he was a member of parliament (Bundestag) and from 1994 to 1998 a member of the European Parliament for Alliance 90/The Greens.

He was married since 1956 and had three children including the composer Jakob Ullmann. He died during a holiday in the Ore Mountains.

== Writings ==
- Wolfgang Ullmann: The psychological Trinitätslehre August in as a theological condition of the medieval ethics. Goettingen, Theol. F., Diss. v. 11. Nov. 1954
- Friedrich de Boor, Wolfgang Ullmann (Hrsg.): Sources: Selected texts from D. History christl. Church. Berlin, Evang. Verl. - Institute, 1980
- Wolfgang Ullmann: Preparatory school of the democracy: Church and round table. Berlin, Berlin: Evang. Verl. - Anst., 1990, ISBN 3-374-01356-2
- Wolfgang Ullmann: Democracy - now or never: Perspectives of the justice. Munich, Kyrill and Method Verl., 1990, ISBN 3-927527-24-6
- Bernhard Maleck, Wolfgang Ullmann: I will not be silent: Discussions with Wolfgang Ullmann, Berlin, Dietz, 1991, ISBN 3-320-01753-5
- Bernhard Maleck, Wolfgang Ullmann: Condition and parliament. A contribution to the condition discussion, Berlin, Dietz, 1992, ISBN 3-320-01775-6
- Wolfgang Ullmann: Future clearing-up. A stocktaking after the end of the utopias. Berlin, context Verl., 1995, ISBN 3-931337-10-3
- Wolfgang Ullmann: Patience, loves Dimut!: Brussels letter. Leipzig, forum Verl., 1998, ISBN 3-931801-04-7
