= Gottleuba Dam =

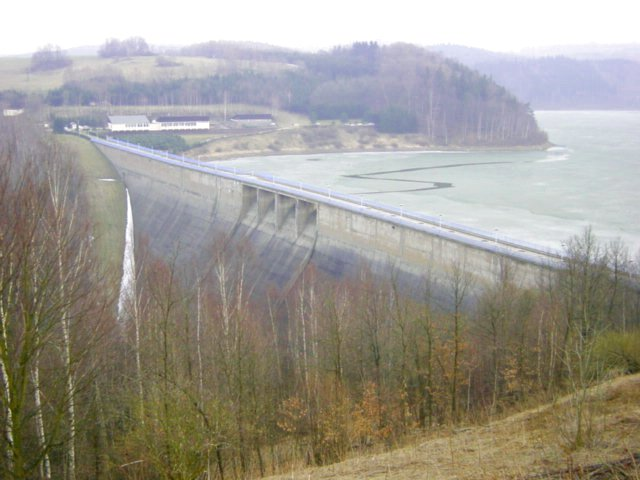

- Location within Germany
- Country: Germany
- Location: Sächsische Schweiz-Osterzgebirge, Saxony
- Coordinates: 50°50′04″N 13°55′51″E
- Construction began: 1965
- Opening date: 1976

Dam and spillways
- Impounds: Gottleuba
- Height: 53.2 m (174.5 ft)
- Length: 327 m (1,073 ft)
- Width (crest): 7 m (23 ft)
- Dam volume: 270,000 m^{3} (9,500,000 ft^{3})
- Spillway capacity: 176 m^{3}/s (6,215 cu ft/s)

Reservoir
- Total capacity: 14.02 hm^{3} (11,370 acre⋅ft)
- Catchment area: 35.3 km^{2} (13.6 sq mi)
- Surface area: 660,000 m^{2} (7,104,181 ft^{2})

Power Station
- Type: Conventional
- Installed capacity: 53 KW

The Gottleuba Dam is the second highest dam in Saxony, Germany. It serves as a reservoir for water supply for the town Pirna and provides flood protection, but energy production is small. The dam was built between 1965 and 1974. It is located at the northern foot of the Ore Mountains, southwest of Bad Gottleuba. It dams up the Gottleuba river.

Above the concrete dam is a lookout point. The dam is not accessible to the public. Bathing and leisure sports in the lake are not allowed, since it is for drinking water. Entry around the lake is allowed.

== See also ==
- Reservoirs and dams in Germany
