= Gottleuba =

River in Germany

Gottleuba / Rybný potok
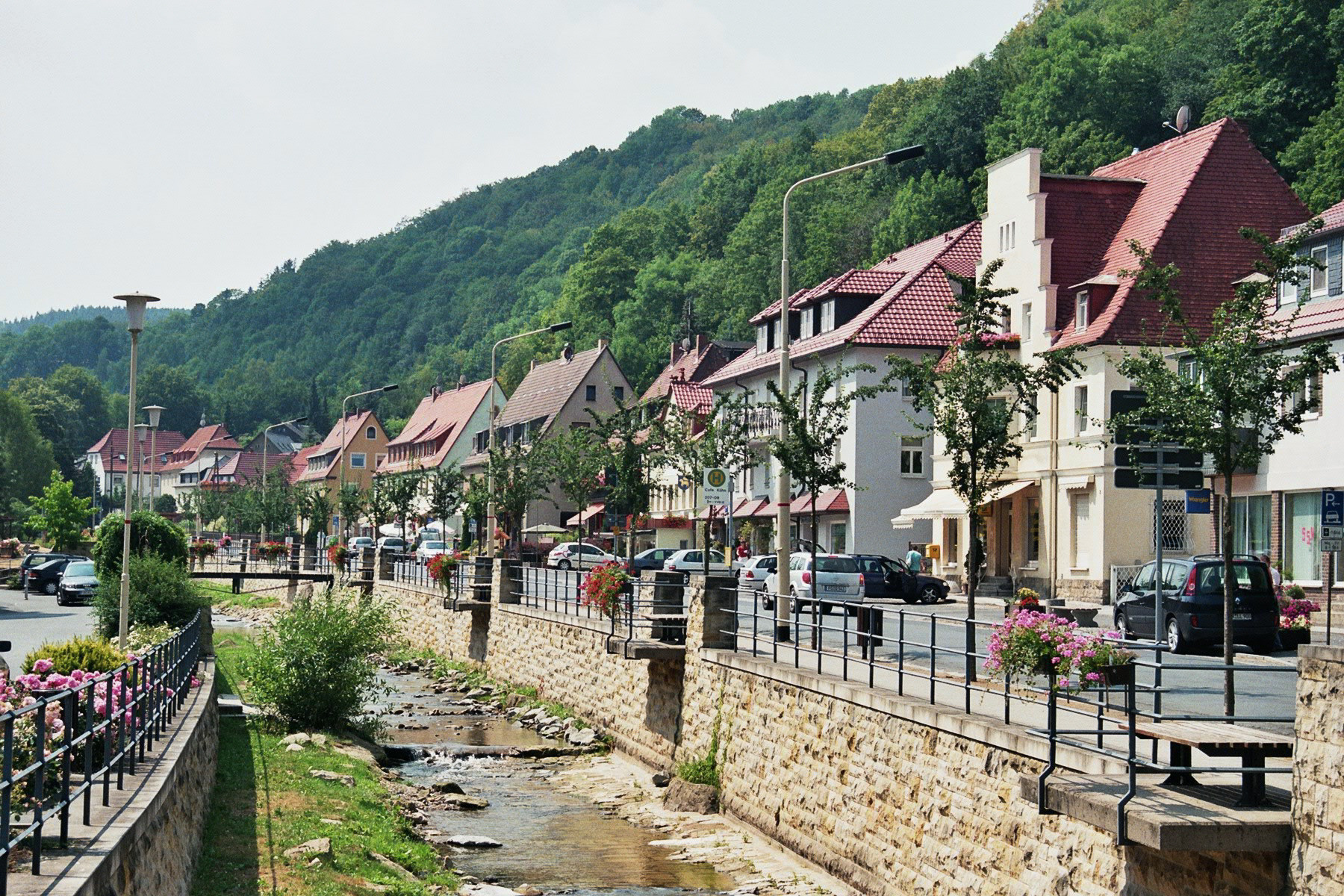
- The Gottleuba in Berggießhübel

Location
- Countries: Germany; Czech Republic
- State (DE): Saxony
- Region (CZ): Ústí nad Labem

Physical characteristics
- Source
  - location: Krásný Les
- Mouth
  - location: Elbe
  - coordinates: 50.9633°N 13.9205°E
- Length: 34 km (21 mi)

Basin features
- Progression: Elbe→ North Sea
- Tributaries
  - right: Bahra

The Gottleuba (German pronunciation: [ˈɡɔtlɔʏba]; Czech: Rybný potok) is a small river in the Czech Republic and in Saxony, Germany. It is a left tributary of the Elbe.

The Gottleuba's source is in the eastern part of the Ore Mountains in Krásný Les within the municipality of Petrovice. After a few km, it crosses the Czech–German border and flows the rest of its 34 km (21 mi) in Saxony. It passes the Gottleuba Dam and the town Bad Gottleuba-Berggießhübel, and flows into the Elbe in Pirna. In July 1927, there was a flash flood in the river due to heavy rain.

== See also ==
- List of rivers of Saxony
- List of rivers of the Czech Republic
