= Dresden to Teplitz Post Road =

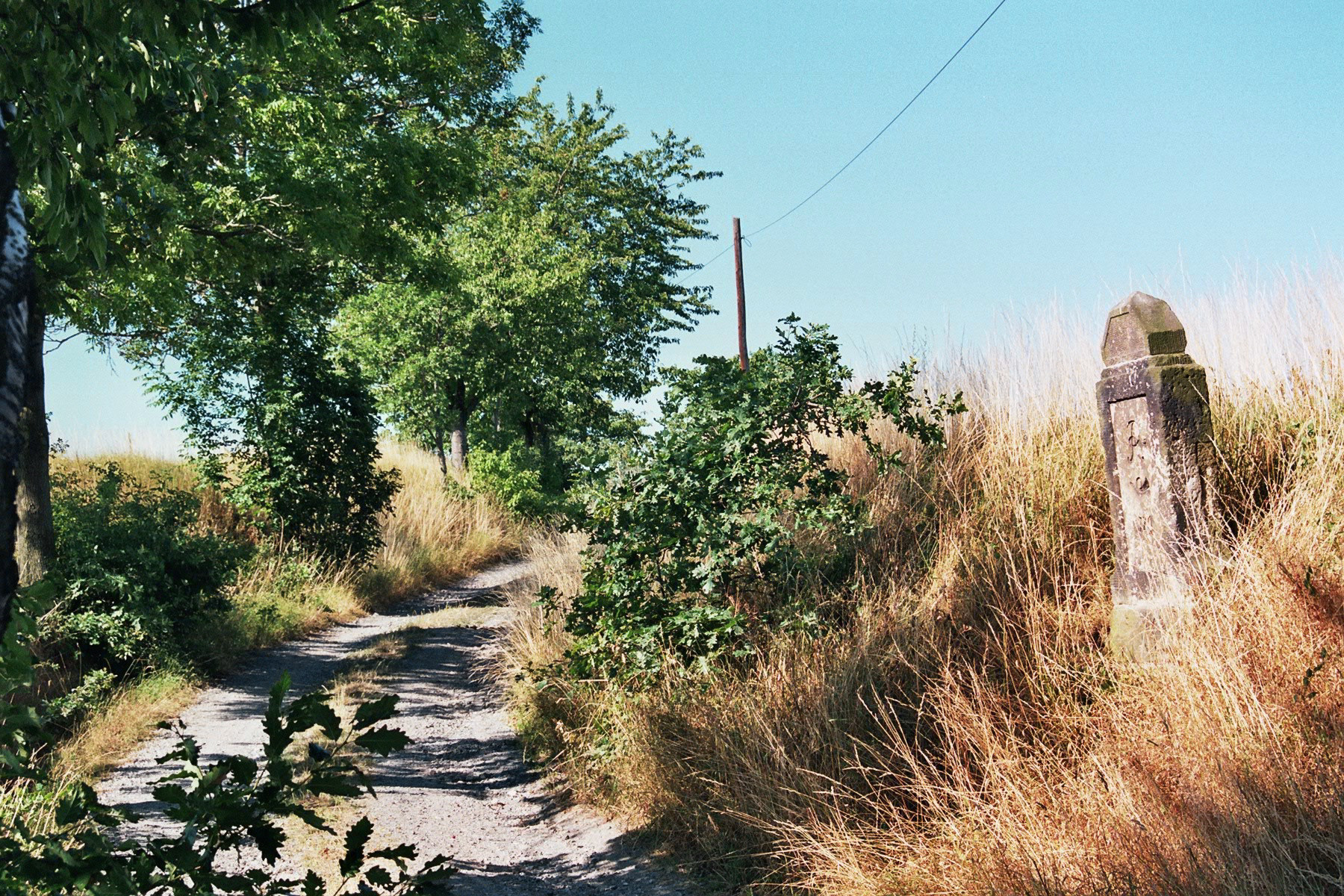
Section of the Old Dresden to Teplitz Post Road near Niederseidewitz

The Old and New Dresden to Teplitz Post Roads (German: Alte und Neue Dresden-Teplitzer Poststraße) are passes over the Ore Mountains and form part of the well-known ancient road system known as the Kulmer Steig, which ran from the Elbe Valley near Dresden over the Eastern Ore Mountains to Teplitz (now Teplice), Bohemia. Today the Saxon section of the Old Dresden to Teplitz Post Road is the best preserved of these historic transport links, complete with old Electorate of Saxony postal milestones.

== Sources ==
- Jörg Brückner/Balder Preuß: Zur Fortsetzung der Alten Dresden-Teplitzer Poststraße jenseits der kursächsischen Landesgrenze. – In: Erzgebirgische Heimatblätter (1995), H. 5, S. 6–11.
- Jörg Brückner/Balder Preuß: Die Dresden-Teplitzer Poststraße. Zum Verlauf des südl. Teiles; dargest. an den Ergebnissen der Vermessungsfahrt von Adam Friedrich Zürner im August 1716 durch Nordböhmen. – In: Sächsische Heimatblätter 42 (1996), H. 5, S. 308–311.
- Siegfried Lange: Eine Fahrt über die Alte Dresden-Teplitzer Poststraße. in: Sächsische Heimatblätter. Heft 6/1971. S. 278–281.
- Christian Preiß: Die Alte Teplitzer Poststraße. Vom vorgeschichtlichen Steig zur Autobahn des 21. Jahrhunderts. Pirna 2004 (Eigenverlag)
- Verkehrsmuseum Dresden (Hrsg.): Entlang der Alten Dresden-Teplitzer Poststraße von Dohna zur Landesgrenze. Exkursionsführer des Verkehrsmuseums Nr. 3. Dresden 1998. (Faltblatt)
