= Bad Gottleuba-Berggießhübel =

Spa town in Saxony, Germany

- Town
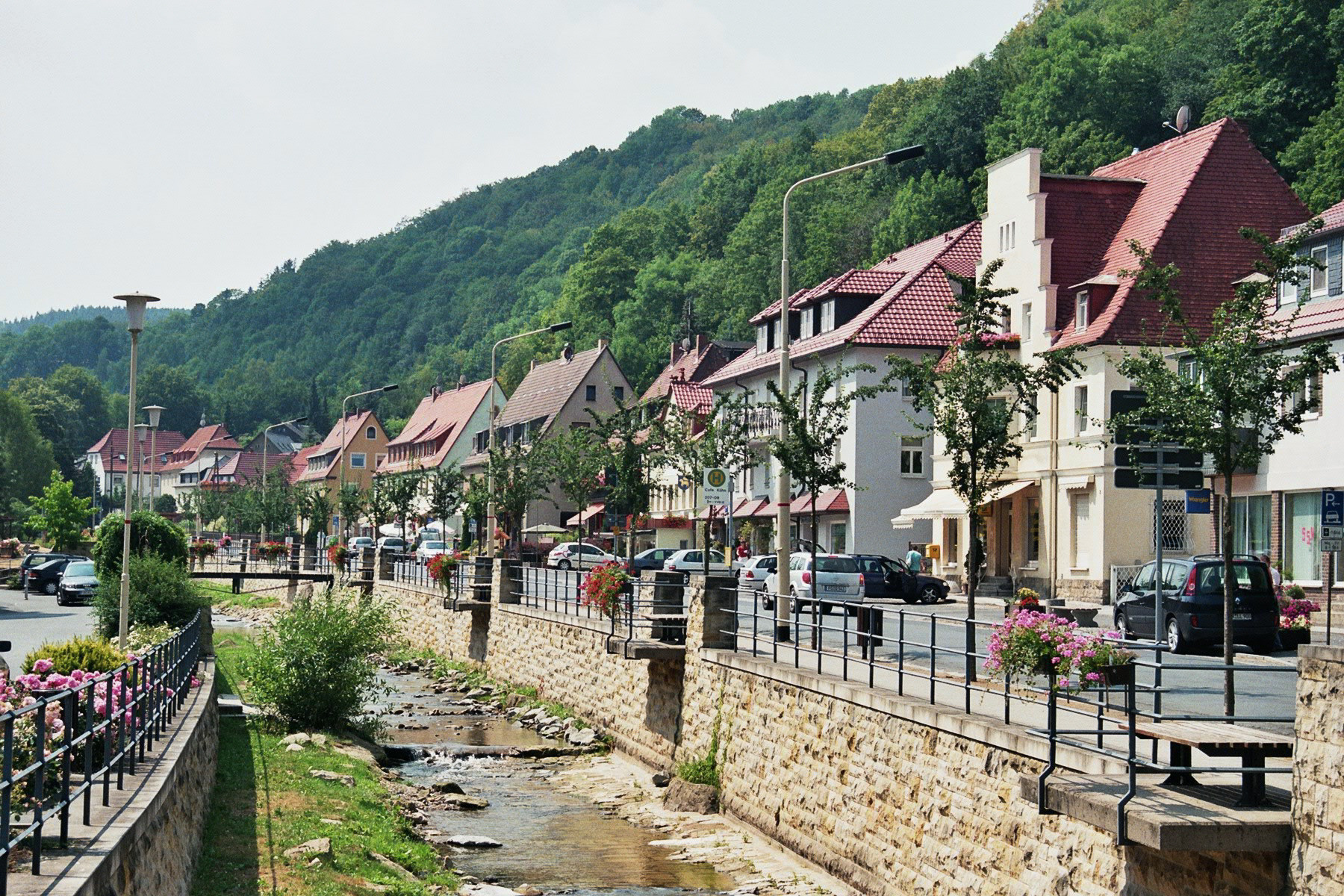
- Main street in Berggießhübel

- Coat of arms

- Location of Bad Gottleuba-Berggießhübel within Sächsische Schweiz-Osterzgebirge district
- Interactive map of Bad Gottleuba-Berggießhübel
- Location within Germany Location within Saxony
- Coordinates: 50°51′30″N 13°57′0″E
- Country: Germany
- State: Saxony
- District: Sächsische Schweiz-Osterzgebirge
- Subdivisions: 12

Government
  - Mayor (2021–28): Thomas Peters (CDU)

Area
  - Total: 88.72 km^{2} (34.25 sq mi)
- Elevation: 211–644 m (692–2,113 ft)

Population (2025-12-31)
  - Total: 5,315
  - Density: 59.91/km^{2} (155.2/sq mi)
- Time zone: UTC+01:00 (CET)
  - Summer (DST): UTC+02:00 (CEST)
- Postal codes: 01816, 01819, 01825
- Dialling codes: 035023, 035025, 035032, 035054
- Vehicle registration: PIR
- Website: www.stadt-badgottleuba-berggiesshuebel.de

Bad Gottleuba-Berggießhübel (German pronunciation: [baːt ˈɡɔtlɔʏba ˈbɛʁkɡiːsˌhyːbl̩]) is a spa town in the district Sächsische Schweiz-Osterzgebirge in Saxony, in eastern Germany. The municipality borders the Czech Republic in the south. The municipality was formed on 1 January 1999 by the merger of the former municipalities Bad Gottleuba, Berggießhübel, Langenhennersdorf, and Bahratal. Surrounded by forests and near a water dam, Bad Gottleuba-Berggießhübel has several facilities including a spa health park, a plant garden, and a heated open air pool.

== Geography ==
The following villages are part of the municipality: Oelsen in the southeast, Markersbach and Hellendorf in the southeast, Hartmannsbach, Breitenau, Börnersdorf, and Hennersbach in the southwest, Bad Gottleuba and Berggießhübel in the central part, and Zwiesel, Bahra, and Langenhennersdorf in the north. The municipality extends up to the foothills of the eastern Ore Mountains and into the Saxon Switzerland. The united spa town is located between the rivers Gottleuba and Bahra. The main settlements Bad Gottleuba and Berggießhübel are on the river Gottleuba.

Distances from Berggießhübel which is more or less in the centre of the combined spa town:

- 25–35 km from Dresden
- 7–11 km from Pirna
- 200 km from Berlin
- 135 km from Prague

Since 2005 the town has been easily accessible via the A17 express motorway Dresden–Prague.

== History ==
In 1459, the boundaries were fixed between Bohemia and Saxony by a contract between the Bohemian king and Frederick II and Duke William III of Saxony, and the area of the current municipality came to Saxony. In 1813, during the Napoleonic Wars, the area suffered damages from battles between the Russians and the French. In 1880, a railway line from Pirna to Berggießhübel was opened. As the Gottleuba Valley Railway it was extended to Gottleuba in 1905, and it closed in 1976. The Gottleuba Dam in the Gottleuba river was built between 1965 and 1974.

=== Oelsen ===
Oelsen is the oldest settlement of the municipality, first mentioned in 1169 as Olesnice. The name originates from the Czech olešná, meaning alder bush. It was one of the first colonised areas of the Knights Hospitaller in the Ore Mountains. In 1429, the Hussites destroyed Oelsen. It wasn't rebuilt until the end of the 15th century.

In 1517 the manor of Oelsen was acquired by the Bünau family, who held it until 1762. At the end of World War II, on 9 May 1945, surviving prisoners of a death march from the Porschdorf subcamp of the Flossenbürg concentration camp were liberated near Oelsen.

In 1996, Oelsen joined Bad Gottleuba.

=== and Hellendorf ===
Markersbach was first documented as Marquardi villa in 1363. Hellendorf was first mentioned as Heldisdorf in 1379. Its school was opened in 1837 and another in 1858. The current school was inaugurated in 1927. In 1970, the two villages were merged into the new municipality Bahratal.

=== Gottleuba ===
Coat of arms of Bad Gottleuba

Global coffee grinder producer 1868–1985

Gottleuba was first mentioned in 1363 as Gotlavia, but it probably already existed at the end of the 13th century. In 1298 Gottleuba together with Pirna became a part of Bohemia. In 1405 Pirna and Gottleuba were taken back by the Margrave of Meissen.

Already at the end of the 14th century Gottleuba was a center for mining, mainly iron, silver, and copper. The last silver mine was closed in 1889. In 1463, Gottleuba received town privileges. In the 16th century, Gottleuba developed guilds with special commercial laws (for example, holding of spring and autumn markets and grant of weekly markets). Wars, disease, large town fires in 1746 and 1865, and the flood disasters of 1552, 1897, 1927, and 1957 again brought considerable setbacks to the city.

A recuperation centre belonging to the Landesversicherungsanstalt Sachsen was built in Gottleuba in 1909. In 1936 the name was officially changed to Bad Gottleuba. Since 1991, the sanatorium which is named Gesundheitspark Bad Gottleuba has been under the charge of TRIA Immobilienanlagen und Verwaltungs-GmbH in Berlin.

=== Berggießhübel ===
Coat of arms of Berggießhübel

Berggießhübel was first mentioned as Gyßhobel in 1412. The origin of the name is disputed, one likely explanation is the mountain where ore is melted and poured. In 1548 it received town privileges. The Thirty Years' War (1618–1648) interrupted the iron works. In 1717, medicinal water was found and Berggießhübel became a spa town. The baths were damaged in the Napoleonic Wars, but in 1822 the business was rebuilt by Friedrich August Freiherr von Leyßer.

With the opening of a railway line from Pirna to Berggießhübel in 1880, the region attracted more visitors. In 1993, the MEDIAN-klinik was opened in the area of Friedrichstal.

=== Langenhennersdorf and Bahra ===
Langenhennersdorf was first mentioned as Hennici villa in 1356 and was assigned to the Margrave of Meissen in 1404. Bahra was mentioned for the first time in 1524. The name originates from the Old High German bar and para, meaning "cleared forest".

Bahra was assigned to the knightly manor (Rittersgut) of Langenhennersdorf in 1548. In 1838, a school was opened in Langenhennersdorf. In 1971, Langenhennersdorf and Bahra became a single municipality.

== Local council ==
The local council has 16 members. Since the elections in May 2014 the CDU has 11 seats and the Left has 5 seats.

== Main sights ==
- Saxon post milestone (Postmeilensäule)
- Gottleuba Dam
- Town hall of Bad Gottleuba-Berggießhübel
- Parks
- A plant garden
- Friedrichsthal Castle
- Heimatstube Museum
- Wandergebiet Labyrinth in Langenhennersdorf
- Waterfall on the Langenhennersdorf stream

== Personalities ==
- Johann Gottlob Lehmann (1719–1767), originally studied medicine, later geologist, one of the founders of stratigraphy
- Heinrich Ferdinand Mannstein (1806–1872), writer
- Fritz Rössler (1912–1987), Nazi instructor; member of the Bundestag 1949–1952, elected using a false name
- Wolfgang Ullmann (1929–2004), German theologian, church historian and politician (Alliance '90/The Greens)
- Dragan Holcer (1945–2015), Yugoslavian football player

== Famous bathers ==
- Christian Fürchtegott Gellert (1715–1769), fabulist
- Gottlieb Rabener (1714–1771), satirist
