= Bahra (river) =

River in the Czech Republic and in Germany

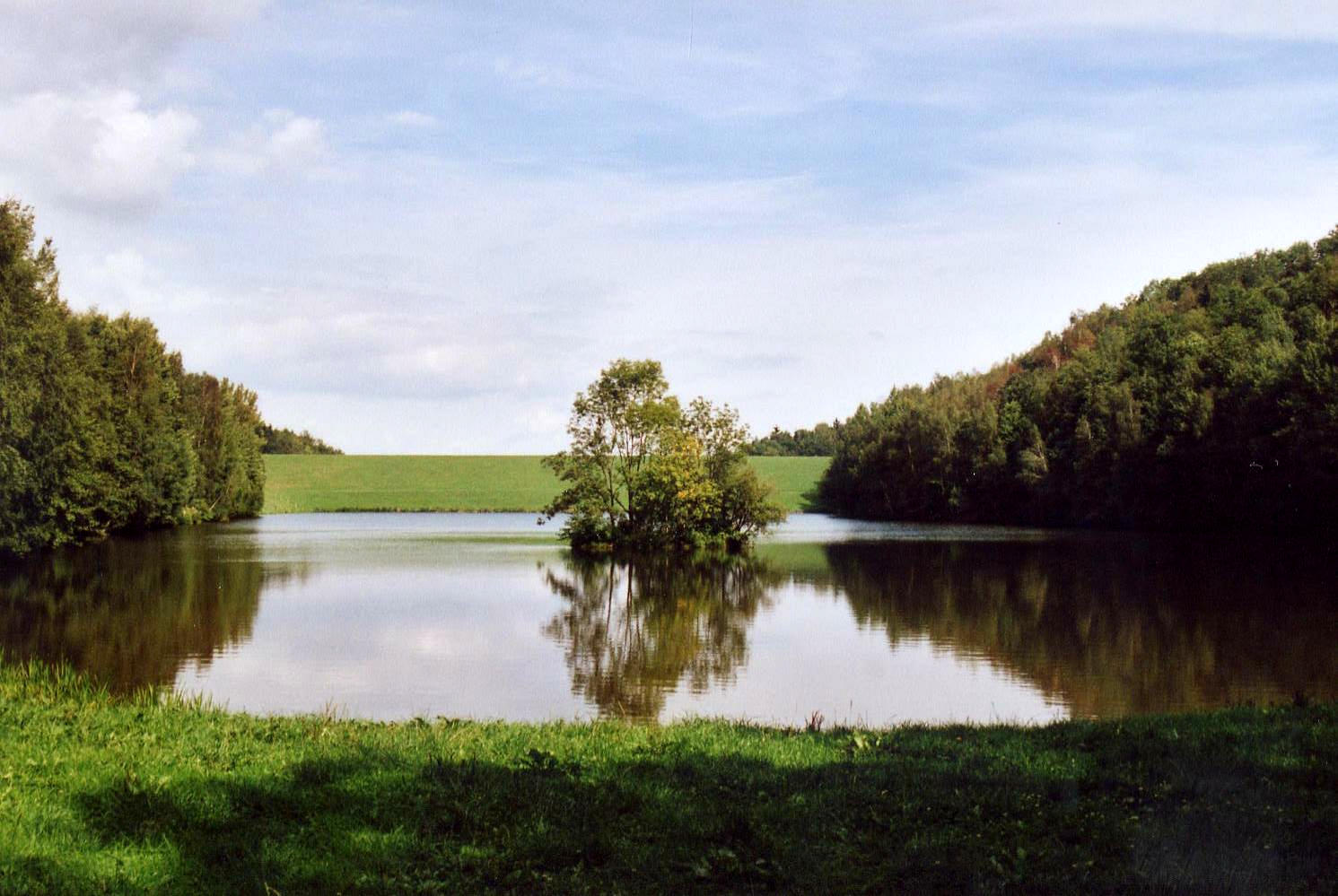

Location
- Countries: Germany and Czech Republic
- State: Saxony

Physical characteristics
- Mouth
  - location: Gottleuba
  - coordinates: 50°53′4″N 13°58′57″E
- Length: 18 km (11 mi)

Basin features
- Progression: Gottleuba→ Elbe→ North Sea

Bahra (German pronunciation: [ˈbaːʁa]) is a river of the Czech Republic and of Saxony, Germany. Its source is in the eastern Ore Mountains, on the Czech border. It flows into the Gottleuba, a tributary of the Elbe.

== See also ==
- List of rivers of Saxony
- List of rivers of the Czech Republic
