= Saxon Siberia =

Term referring to certain mountain regions in Central Europe

Saxon Siberia (German: Sächsisches Sibirien) is a term referring to the higher regions of the Western Ore Mountains and the Vogtland in Central Europe. The term was first coined in the 18th century.

== Origin of the name ==
The region was given this name because of the harsh climate experienced on the upper part of the mountain range. In 1732 an Austrian Rectification Commission described Gottesgarb, located on the Saxon-Bohemian border, as a place unfit for human habitation. The organization believes that no commercial crops can survive in this area, and even hardy weeds cannot take root. The weather in this area is very cold. And due to the heavy fog, visibility is also extremely limited, which makes first-time travelers eventually lost in the heavy snow forever.

== Description ==
Comparisons of the Ore Mountains with Siberia, due to their harsh conditions, were encountered by the priest and chronicler Georg Körner from Bockau in 1757. After reading the double-layer map of the Ore Mountain districts published by Matthias Seuttern, he was surprised by the local population and the number of towns in the Ore Mountains, which completely changed his mind. Because he believed that the Ore Mountains were a place comparable to Siberia, where there was no food and people suffered from famine. Therefore, he advises readers not to think of the Ore Mountains as an uninhabited place.

In 1775 the term "Saxon Siberia" was first explained in detail in a document entitled Mineralogical History of the Saxon Ore Mountains. It was probably authored by the Saxon genealogist, Johann Friedrich Wilhelm Toussaint von Charpentier. On page 48 it states:

"Report from the so-called Saxon Siberia. We have here on our high mountains a rather extensive region, which is so wild and harsh that it is usually called Saxon Siberia. It runs from Eybenstock over the Voigtländischen Creys to the Fichtelberg. Apart from a few otherwise very bleak places (such as Jöhstadt, Satzungen, Kuhnheyde, Neudorf, Joh. Georgenstadt, Wiesenthal etc.) where potatoes, cabbages, turnips and oats are grown (albeit the latter hardly ripens but is at least used to produce the necessary straw for cattle), not a single potato grows, let alone a kernel of corn. Everything is covered by thick, wild and dark woods, not a single furrow of farmland can be traced. In winter, which lasts for most of the year, the snow generally lies 3 ells high and does not completely disappear until Johannis, especially in the hollows where the snow is brought by the wind from the mountains and lies 10, 20, even 30 ells deep. Only Volcanus has established his workshops here. The hammer works: Ober- und Unter-Blauenthal, Neidhardtsthal, Wildenthal, Wittingthal [i.e. Wittigsthal], Schlössel-Unterwiesenthal, Carlsfeld, and their associated glassworks, Morgenroths-Rautenkranzs- and Tannenbergsthal lie partly within and partly around this wilderness. ... the local forest houses are often completely snowed in during the winter, so that their occupants must dig themselves out with shovels and cut channels to enable light to reach their windows ...

Meanwhile this bleak desert is the true homeland of our best and most precious stones, some of which are won from the rocks, like the topaz from the Schneckenstein, and some are found among the hybrid plants of the Auersberger, Steinbächer, Sauschwemmer, Knocker und Pechhöfer soap works."

When August Schumann's Lexikon of Saxony appeared at the beginning of the 19th century in large numbers, the term "Saxon Siberia" became widespread. However, later, many prominent representatives of the Ore Mountain Club described it as "completely inaccurate".

In 1908, Philipp Weigel used the term in the title of his book Das Sächsische Sibirien.

== Sources ==
- Wünschmann, Max (1910). Über das Aufkommen der völlig unzutreffenden Bezeichnung "Sächsisches Sibirien" für unser Erzgebirge und des Namens "Das Erzgebirge". In: Glückauf. 30. 1910, p. 9–10.
- Weigel, Philipp (1908). Das Sächsisches Sibirien. Sein Wirtschaftsleben. Berlin.
- Weckschmidt (1910). Noch eine Ehrenrettung unseres Erzgebirges aus alter Zeit. In: Glückauf. 30. 1910, p. 23.
- von Charpentier, Johann Friedrich Wilhelm Toussaint (unconfirmed) (1775). Mineralogische Geschichte des Sächsischen Erzgebirges), Carl Ernst Bohn, Hamburg, p. 48.
