= Deutscheinsiedel =

- Ortsteil of Deutschneudorf
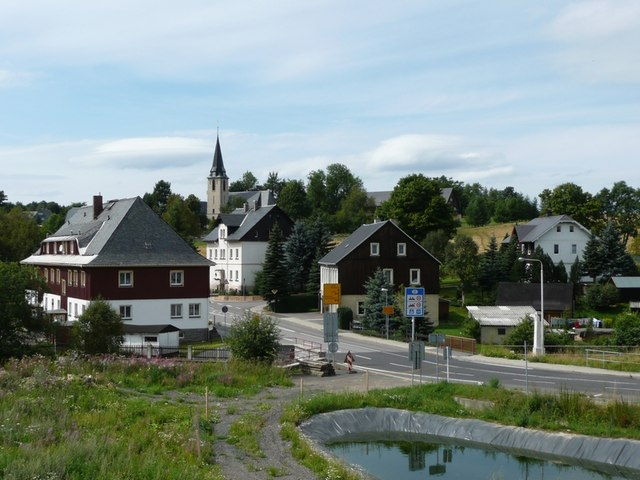
- A view of Deutscheinsiedel
- Interactive map of Deutscheinsiedel
- Location within Germany Location within Saxony
- Coordinates: 50°37′55.84″N 13°29′31.76″E
- Country: Germany
- State: Saxony
- District: Erzgebirgskreis
- Municipality: Deutschneudorf
- Time zone: UTC+01:00 (CET)
  - Summer (DST): UTC+02:00 (CEST)
- Postal codes: 09548
- Dialling codes: 037368

Deutscheinsiedel is a village in the Saxon municipality of Deutschneudorf in the district of Erzgebirgskreis in East Germany.

== Sources ==
- Um Olbernhau und Seiffen. Edition no. 1 Akademie-Verlag Berlin, Berlin 1985 (Werte unserer Heimat. Vol. 43).
- Landratsamt Mittlerer Erzgebirgskreis, Hrsg.: Zur Geschichte der Städte und Gemeinden im Mittleren Erzgebirgskreis, Eine Zeittafel (parts 1-3)
- Neue Dörfer In: Die böhmischen Exulanten in Sachsen, Christian Adolf Pescheck, Leipzig bei S. Hirzel, 1857, p. 104–107 (Digitalisat)
