= Adam Friedrich Zürner =

German cartographer and geographer

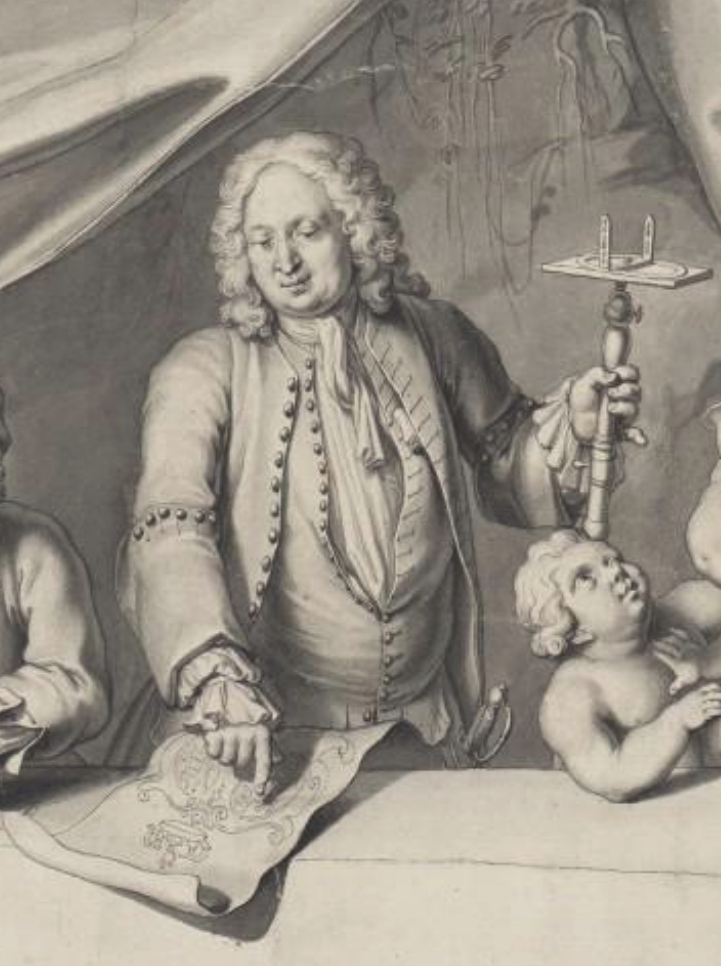
- Born: 15 August 1679; Marieney, Vogtland, Holy Roman Empire
- Died: 18 December 1742 (aged 63); Dresden, Holy Roman Empire
- Scientific career
- Fields: Geography

Adam Friedrich Zürner (15 August 1679 – 18 December 1742) was a German cartographer and geometrician. In the 18th century, he served as the royal commissioner for lands and boundaries of the Electorate of Saxony. He produced more than 900 maps.

== Biography ==
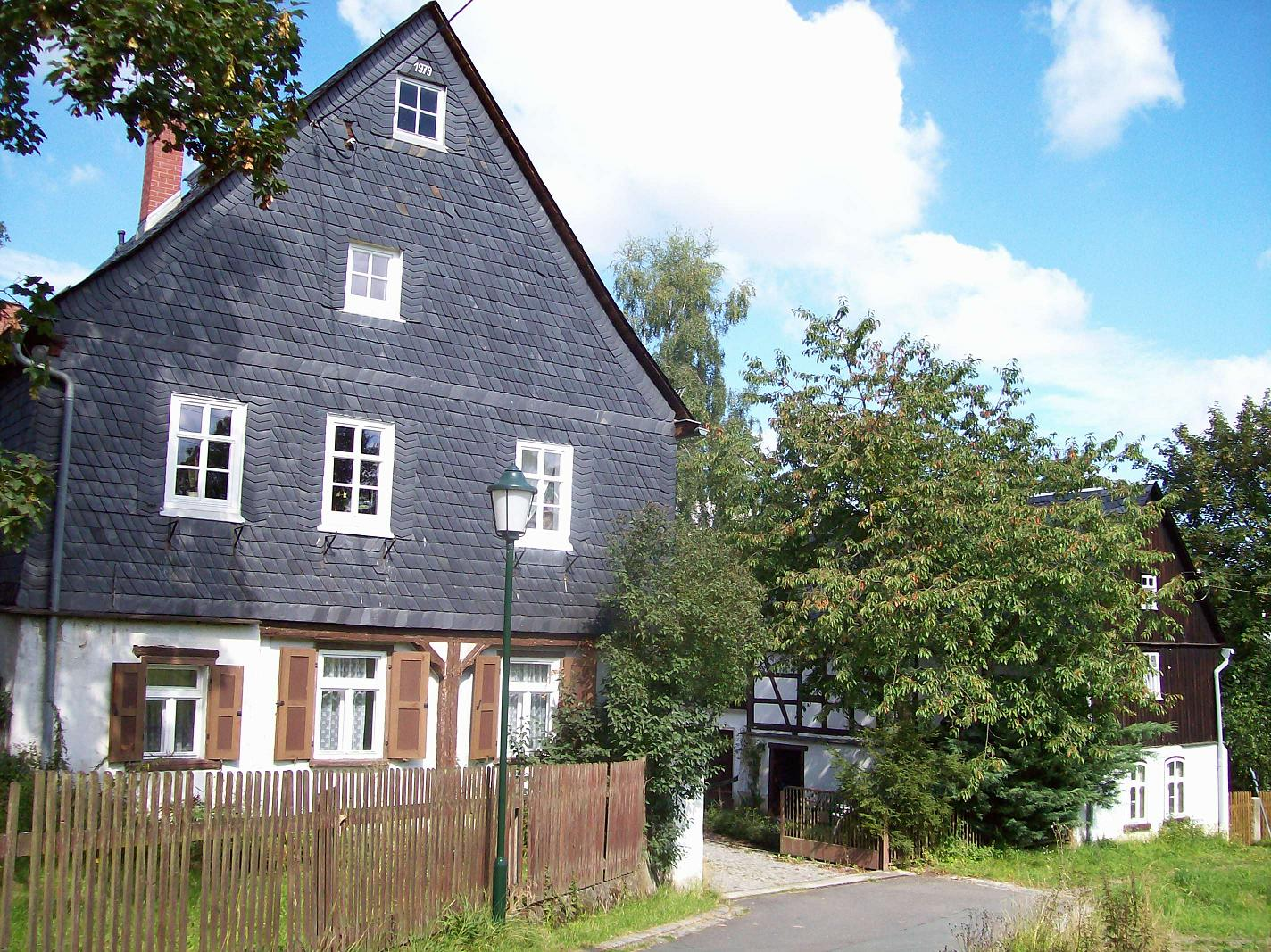
Zürner house in Marieney

On 15 August 1679, Zürner was born in Marieney as the second son to pastor Adam Zürner. His interest in geography was realized during his homeschooling. He attended the Latin school in Oelsnitz, Vogtland, the gymnasium in Hof, Bavaria, the University of Wittenberg, and then the University of Leipzig in 1703, which he graduated from as Master of Theology in 1704. He served as a pastor in the Großenhain amt.

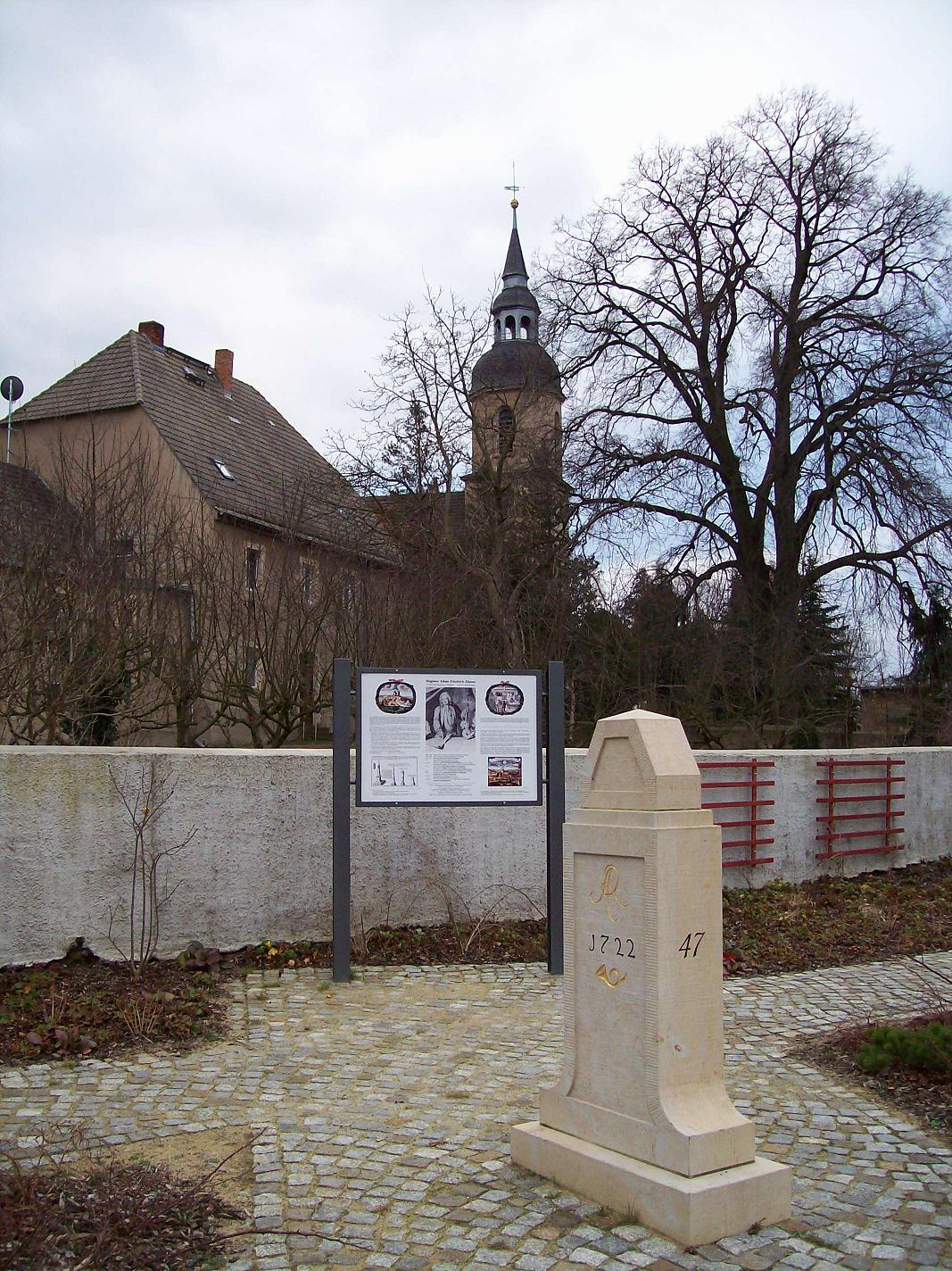
Memorial in Skassa, Großenhain

In 1711, seeking the interest of Augustus II the Strong, he mapped the amt, with it being published in Amsterdam by Peter Schenk the Elder shortly after. His 1712 map of the Tsardom of Russia used Siberia instead of Tartary, a practice that became common. On 12 April 1713, he was commissioned by Augustus to map the entire Electorate of Saxony. On 4 March 1716, he was appointed Churfürstlich Sächsischer Königlich Polnischer Geograph by Augustus; his service secured his membership at the Prussian Academy of Sciences the same year. After 1721, he served as the geographical royal commissioner of the electorate until his death. His assistant was Paul Trenckmann and held correspondence with Johann Christoph Müller. His Neue Chur Sæchsische Post Charte (1715) was published by Moritz Bodenehr and Atlas saxonicus novus by Peter Schenk the Younger, with the latter first surfacing in 1752.

== Sources ==
Bibliography

- Edney, Matthew H.; Pedley, Mary Sponberg; Karrow, Robert W.; Reinhartz, Dennis; Tyacke, Sarah (2020). "Z" (PDF). Cartography in the European Enlightenment. Chicago: University of Chicago Press. ISBN 9780226339221 – via De Gruyter.
