= Göltzsch Viaduct =

Göltzsch Viaduct Göltzschtalbrücke
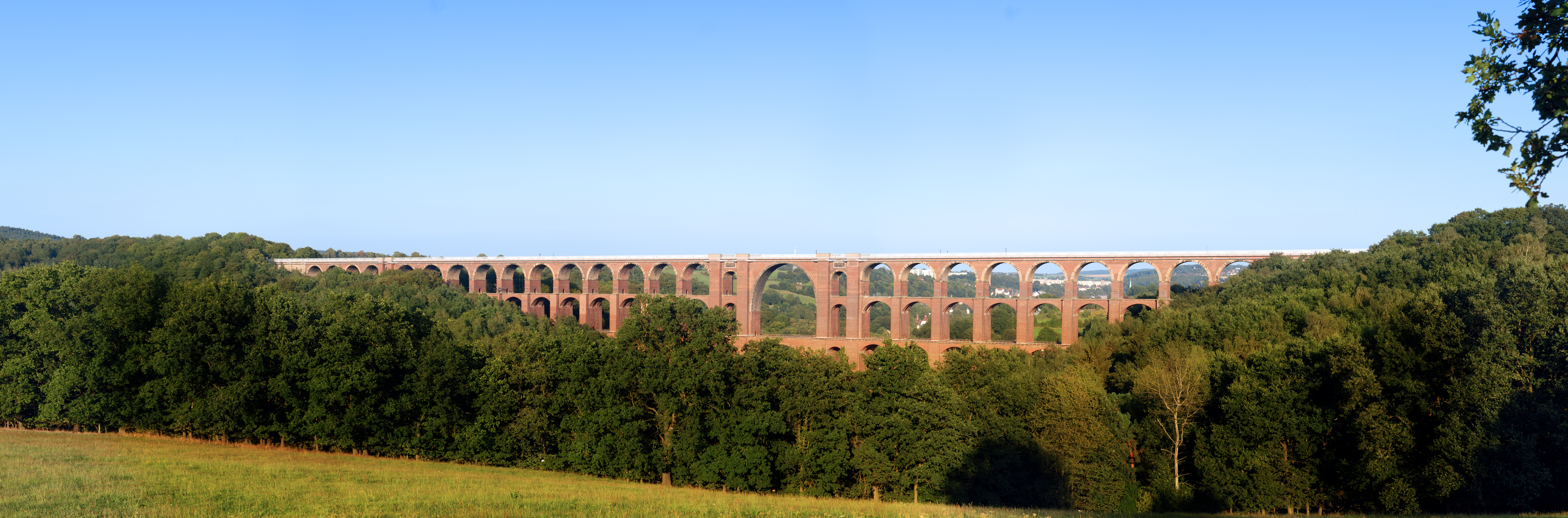
- Coordinates: 50.62258°N 12.24374°E
- Carries: Two railway tracks
- Crosses: Göltzsch river
- Locale: Reichenbach im Vogtland and Netzschkau, Saxony, Germany
- Maintained by: Deutsche Bahn

Characteristics
- Design: Arch bridge
- Material: World's largest brick bridge, sporting a total of 26,021,000 bricks and a volume of 135,676 cubic metres (4,791,400 cu ft)
- Total length: 574 metres (1,883 ft)
- Width: 23 metres (75 ft) at the foot 9 metres (30 ft) at the top
- Height: 78 metres (256 ft)
- No. of spans: 98 vaults in total divided over 4 levels; the top level is composed of 29 arches, the widest arch spanning 30.9 metres (101 ft)

History
- Designer: Johann Andreas Schubert
- Construction start: 31 May 1846
- Construction end: 1851
- Construction cost: 2.2 million Thalers
- Opened: 15 July 1851

Location
- Interactive map of Göltzsch Viaduct

The Göltzsch Viaduct (German: Göltzschtalbrücke, pronounced [ˈɡœlt͡ʃtaːlˌbʁʏkə]) is a railway bridge in Germany. It is the largest brick-built bridge in the world, and for a time it was the tallest railway bridge in the world. It spans the valley of the Göltzsch River between the Reichenbach im Vogtland district of Mylau and the adjacent town of Netzschkau in the German Free State of Saxony.

It was built between 1846 and 1851 as part of the railway between Saxony (Leipzig, Zwickau, and Plauen) and Bavaria (Hof and Nuremberg). It is currently part of the Leipzig–Hof line, near the Netzschkau station. About 10 kilometres (6.2 mi) south, the smaller Elster Viaduct was built for the same line and is quite similar to the Göltzsch Viaduct.

Göltzsch Viaduct is also the name of a much smaller viaduct built in 1938 where Bundesautobahn 72 crosses the Göltzsch River. It sits about 10 km (6 mi) due southeast near the village of Weissensand.

Göltzsch Viaduct (previously Mylau Central Station) was also the name of a terminus opened in 1895 on the Reichenbach–Göltzsch Viaduct railway in the Göltzsch valley below the railway bridge. From here, trains departed to the central station of Reichenbach im Vogtland and to Lengenfeld.

== History and construction ==
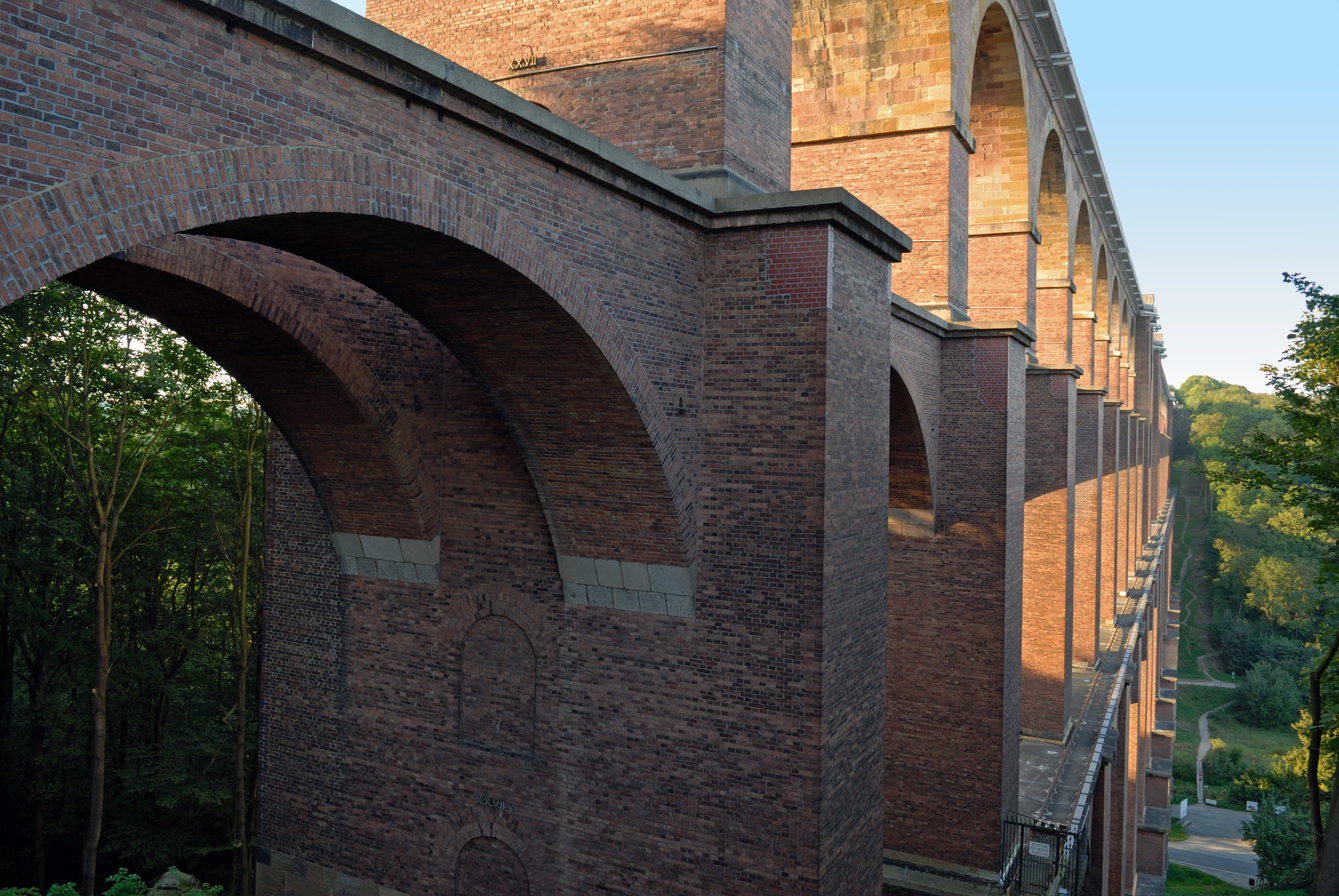
Detail

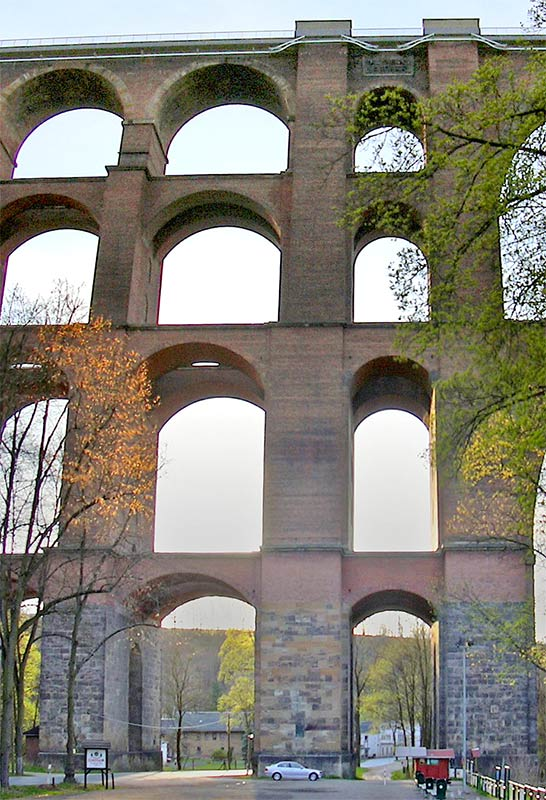
Size of the bridge compared to a car

One of the greatest challenges in constructing a railway between Saxony and Bavaria was how to bridge the Göltzsch valley. Hoping to find a financially feasible construction plan, the Saxon-Bavarian Railway Company announced a contest on 27 January 1845 in all major German magazines with prize money of 1000 Thalers. However, none of the 81 submissions could prove by means of structural analysis that it would be able to withstand the stresses of rail traffic on the bridge. The prize money was eventually divided among four contestants, but none of their designs were actually realized.

The chairman of the jury, professor Johann Andreas Schubert subsequently designed a bridge himself, making use of his recently attained knowledge of structural analysis, and letting himself be inspired by the submitted designs and the viaduct in Leubnitz (Werdau), which was finished in the summer of 1845, making it the first bridge in the world to be subjected to a full structural analysis. It was planned to build the bridge mainly out of bricks, at the time a highly unusual choice, because of the abundance of loam in the vicinity, which allowed for rapid and cost-efficient production of bricks. Granite was to be used only for certain crucial segments.

The first stone was laid on 31 May 1846. The plans were revised just once after construction began, when certain technical difficulties arose. For instance, the foundation on which the bridge was to be built turned out to be less firm than previously assumed. Chief engineer Robert Wilke solved this by replacing the arches in the middle with one great central arch, which only added to the impressiveness of this edifice.

The Göltzsch Viaduct was an extraordinarily large endeavor for its time. Each day, the nearly 20 brickyards along the railway line would produce 50,000 bricks with the unusual dimensions of 28×14×6.5 centimetres (11.0×5.5×2.6 in). The scaffolding was custom-made for each arch, totalling 23,000 tree trunks, although other sources even speak of 230,000 trunks. In total, 1,736 construction workers built the bridge, with 31 on-site fatalities. When the bridge was completed and inaugurated on 15 July 1851, it was world's tallest railway bridge. Today, it still holds the record for largest brick bridge in the world.

=== Key people ===
- Professor Johann Andreas Schubert (1808–1870) – Chairman of the jury, architect, structural analyst
- Chief engineer Robert Wilke (1804–1889) – Construction planner and chief superintendent
- Engineer Ferdinand Dost (1810–1888) – Superintendent
- Pharmacist and chemist Heinrich Carl – Mortar composition

== Recent history ==
A museum in the nearby Mylau Castle opened in 1883 that has dedicated a room to the Göltzsch Viaduct, that among others includes a scale model of the scaffolding, copies of the original building plans, a three-dimensional height map of the region, and photographs and paintings made during the construction of the bridge.

In 1930, a top layer of reinforced concrete with a parapet allowed the railway track to be widened.

During the latter days of World War II, the Wehrmacht intended to blow up the bridge with explosives. This plan was never executed.

Between 1955 and 1958, the masonry was completely restored. It would take until 1977 for all work, including smaller jobs such as the placement of steel cover plates, to be completed.

The Göltzsch Viaduct is part of the so-called Saxon-Franconian trunk line (Sachsen-Franken-Magistrale), which was restored from 1997 to 2000. This allows tilting trains to use this trajectory, which can reach speeds of up to 160 kilometres per hour (99 mph) even on curved tracks.

From 2001 to 2007 and again from 2010 to 2013, a helium tethered balloon situated near the bridge allowed tourists to view the bridge and its surroundings from an altitude of 150 metres (490 ft).

The bridge is infamous for its reputation as a suicide bridge, as many have taken their lives by plunging off the bridge over the past 150 years. In August 2001, three teenagers from Reichenbach im Vogtland jumped off. The 2002 documentary film Ein Tag mit Folgen: Teuflische Spiele (A Day with Consequences: Diabolical Games) by Judith Keil and Antje Kruska tells the story of the teenagers's lives, and how the people who knew them attempted to come to terms with the events. After eight suicides in just eight months in 2002, the Federal Police increased supervision.

Between 2006 and 2008, Deutsche Bahn invested 2.2 million Euros in a new elevator system for maintenance work on the bridge.

In June 2009, the German engineers' guild declared the Göltzsch Viaduct along with the Fernsehturm Stuttgart as historical milestone of engineering. This title was previously awarded in 2007 to the Niederfinow boat lift.

From mid-2010 to early 2012, only one track could be used at one time for rail transport, due to the electrification of the track between Reichenbach im Vogtland and Hof. The top of the bridge was replaced by reinforced concrete, which supports the 22 masts that carry the overhead lines.

== See also ==
- List of bridges in Germany
