= Mylau =

- Stadtteil of Reichenbach im Vogtland
- Coat of arms
- Interactive map of Mylau
- Location within Germany Location within Saxony
- Coordinates: 50°37′N 12°16′E
- Country: Germany
- State: Saxony
- District: Vogtlandkreis
- Town: Reichenbach im Vogtland

Area
  - Total: 4.73 km^{2} (1.83 sq mi)
- Elevation: 305 m (1,001 ft)

Population (2014-12-31)
  - Total: 2,585
  - Density: 547/km^{2} (1,420/sq mi)
- Time zone: UTC+01:00 (CET)
  - Summer (DST): UTC+02:00 (CEST)
- Postal codes: 08499
- Dialling codes: 03765
- Vehicle registration: V
- Website: www.mylau.de

Mylau (German pronunciation: [ˈmyːlaʊ]) is a town and a former municipality in the Vogtlandkreis district, in the Free State of Saxony, Germany with about 2600 citizens. Since 1 January 2016 it is part of the town Reichenbach im Vogtland. It is situated in the valleys of the river Göltzsch and the Raumbach, a stream flowing from Reichenbach im Vogtland that is locally known as the Soap Stream (German: Seifenbach) because of the textile painting factories that had been built by its banks. The town lies 6 km southeast of Greiz, and 20 km southwest of Zwickau. Mylau has the smallest area of any town ("Stadt") in what was formerly East Germany, although there are 10 towns in what was formerly West Germany that are even smaller in area.

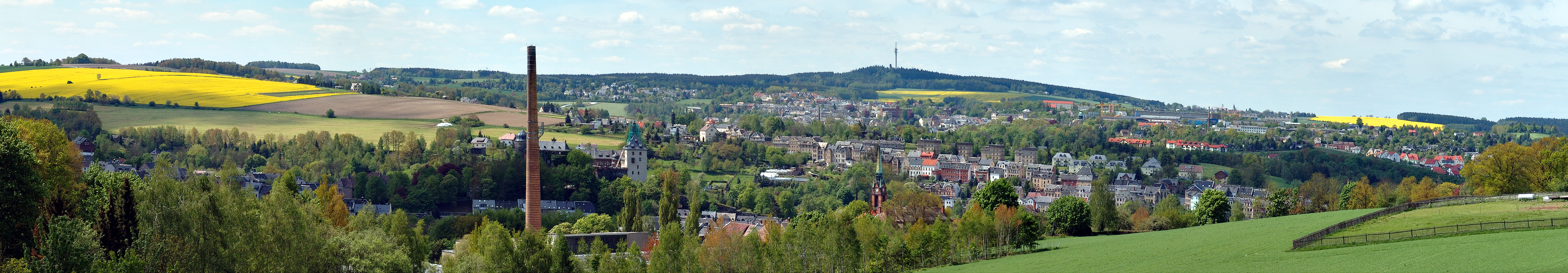
Panorama of Mylau

== History ==
In the 14th century, a settlement was built at the foot of Mylau Castle (1180). Emperor Charles IV granted town privileges in 1376. Until late in the 17th century, the town was reasonably insignificant; in 1650 it was composed of only 24 houses. It then grew rapidly because of a rise of manual weaving craftsmanship in the area, which facilitated the rapid development of the textile industry in the 19th century.

Population growth (as of 1960, the poll date is December 31):

1706: 900; 1834: 2393; 1871: 4449; 1890: 6353; 1910: 7957; 1925: 7166; 1933: 7375	1939: 6986; 1946: 7562; 1950: 7234; 1960: 6668; 1964: 6393; 1971: 6087; 1990: 3658	1998: 3364; 1999: 3328; 2000: 3316; 2001: 3202; 2002: 3119; 2003: 3080; 2004: 3013	2005: 2979; 2007: 2889; 2008: 2878; 2009: 2858

Data before 1998: Digitales Historisches Ortsverzeichnis von Sachsen
Data since 1998: Statistisches Landesamt Sachsen

== Sites of interest ==
Mylau Castle was built in 1180 at the place where the Raumbach flows into the Göltzsch river, and is still intact. One kilometer to the northwest of the town the world-famous Göltzsch Viaduct crosses the Göltzsch valley. Also worth visiting is the city church St. Wenzel established in 1890, which includes a Gottfried Silbermann organ built in 1730/1731).

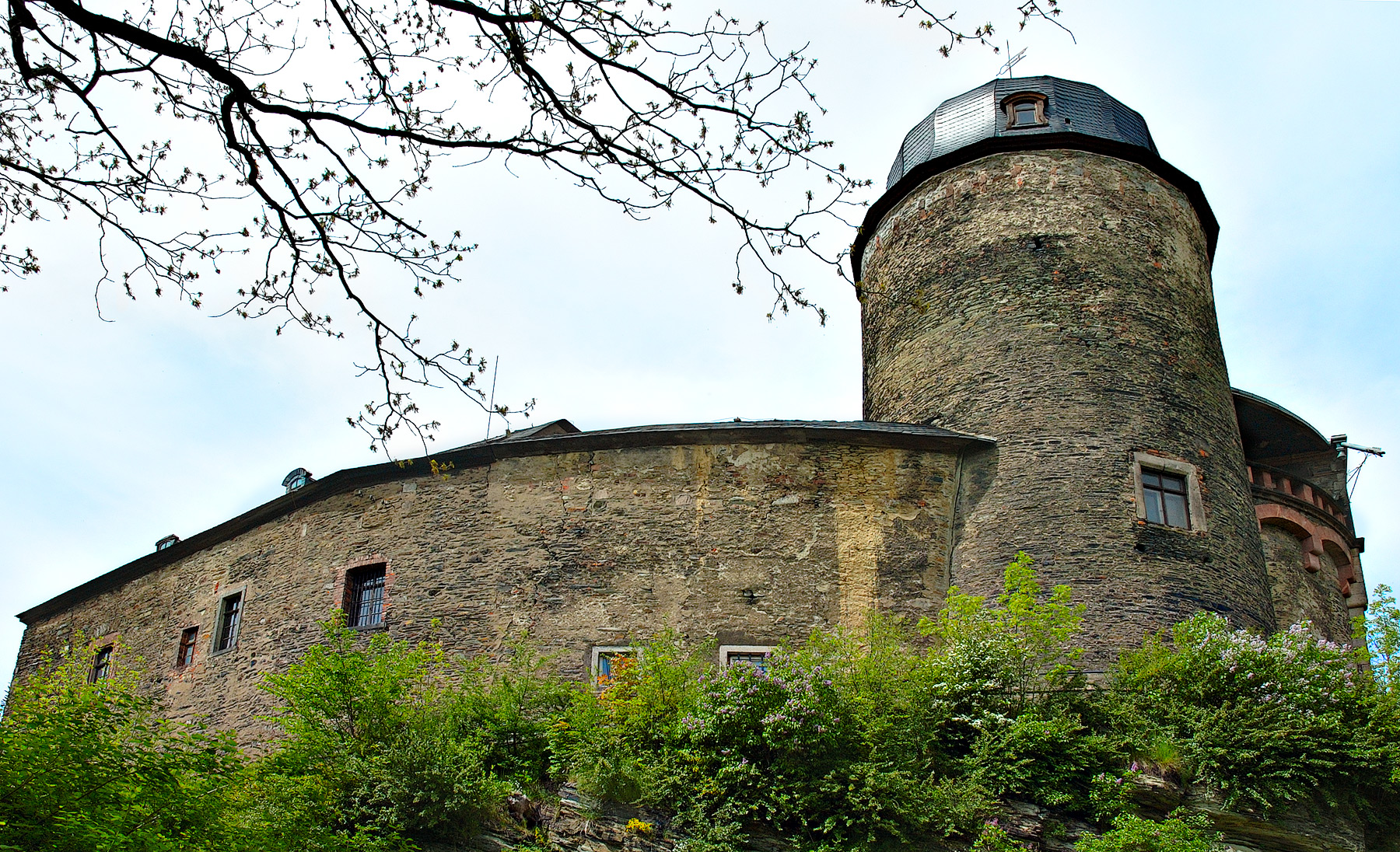
Mylau Castle

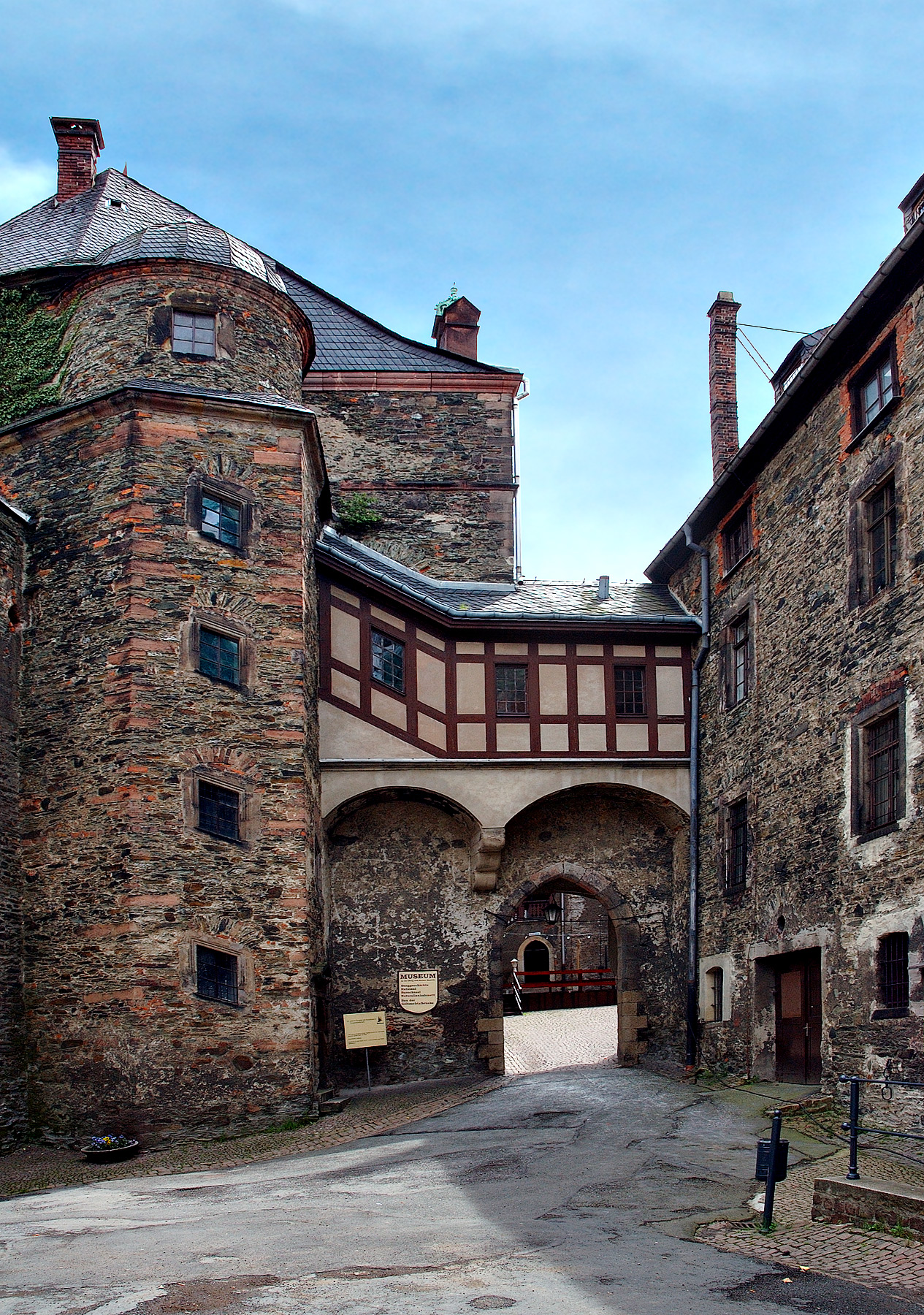
Mylau Castle inner courtyard

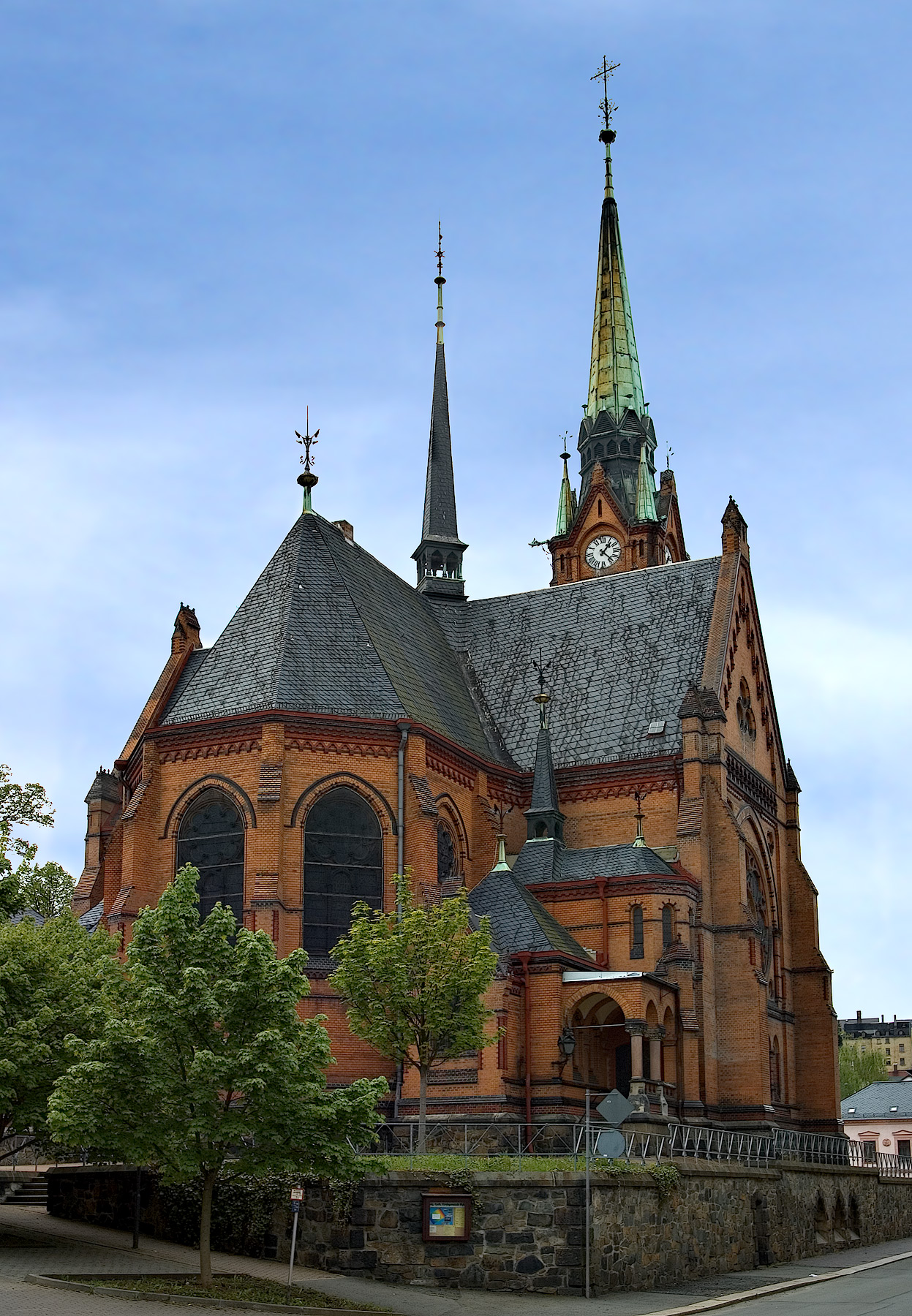
City church (rear view)

== See also ==
- Media related to Mylau at Wikimedia Commons
- Municipal Web site (in German)
- City information (in German)
- Digitales Historisches Ortsverzeichnis von Sachsen (Digital Historic City Directory of Saxony) (in German)
