= Richard Benz =

German historian (1884–1966)

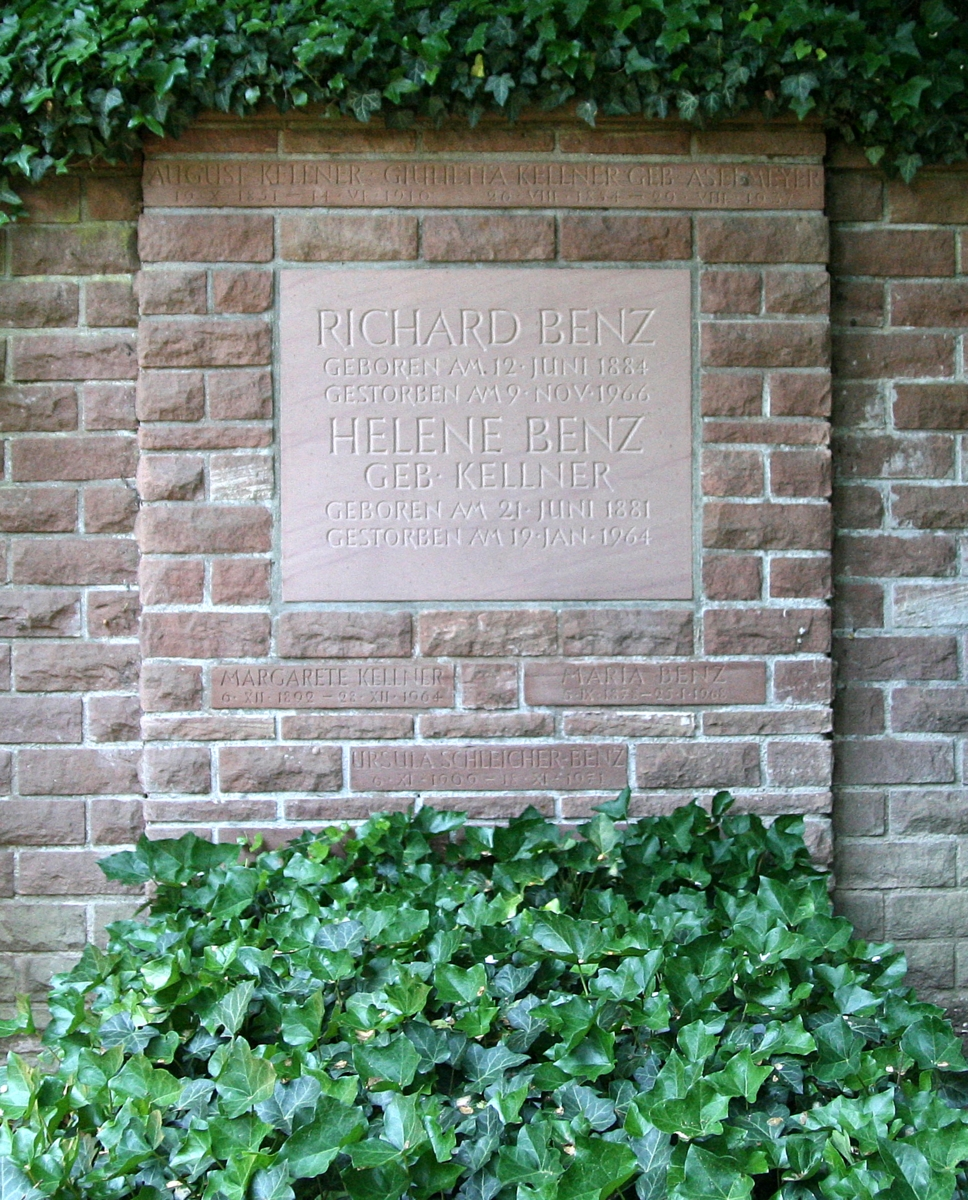
Benz' grave in Heidelberg

Richard Benz (12 June 1884, Reichenbach im Vogtland – 9 November 1966, Heidelberg) was a historian and writer. He came to Heidelberg in 1902, where he was made honorary citizen in 1954. The historian, son of a pastor, is not related to the automotive pioneer Karl Benz. At Heidelberg Benz studied philosophy and cultural history at the university.

Heidelberg awards a medal named after him.
