= Ročov =

- Market town
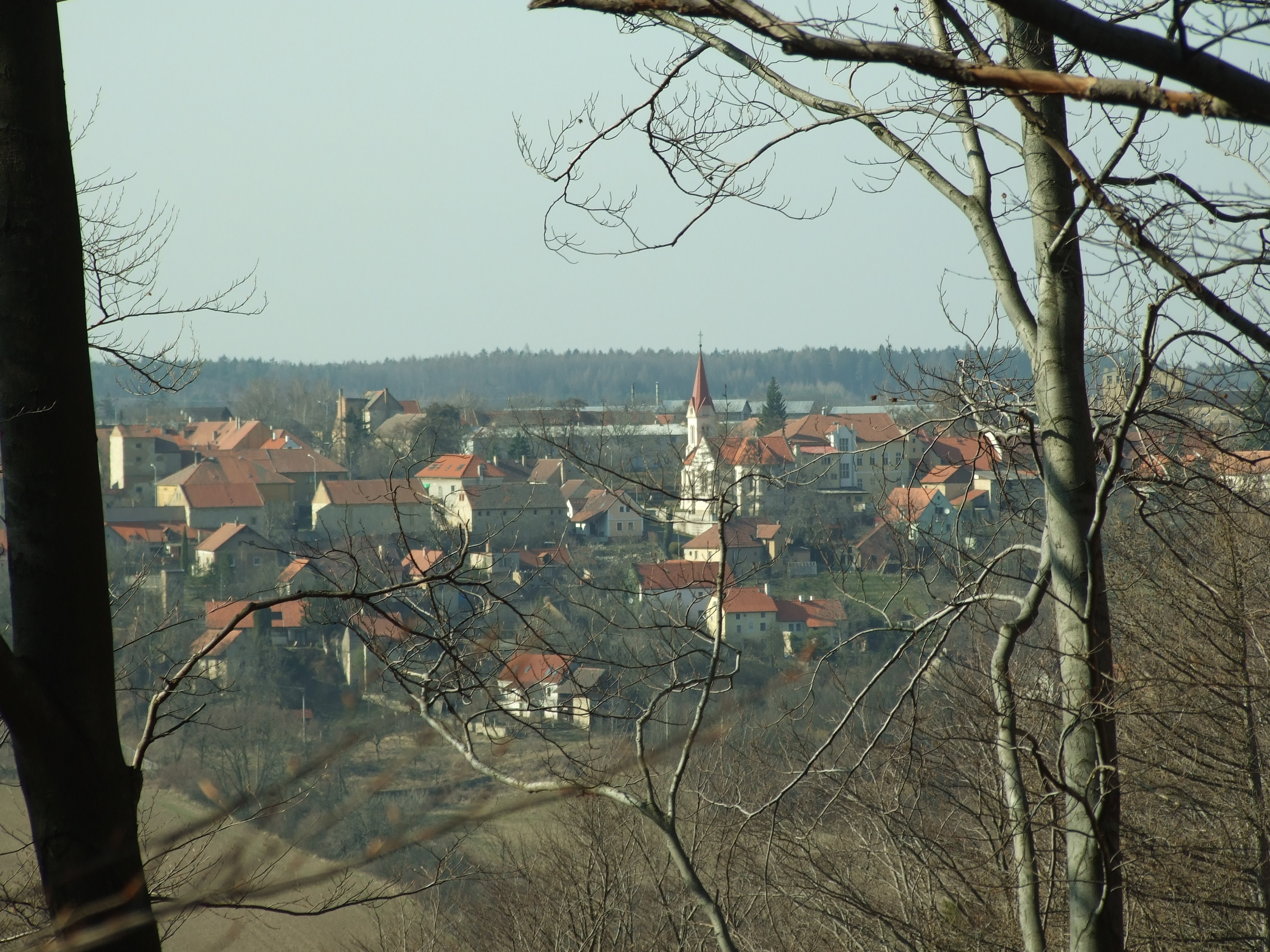
- View from the southeast

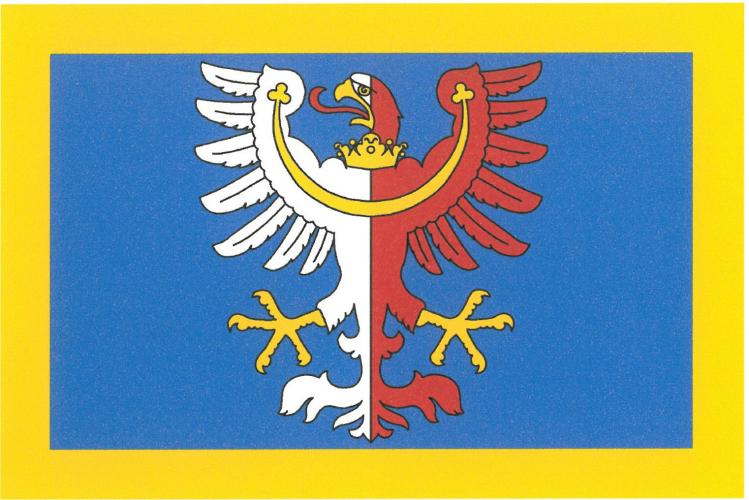
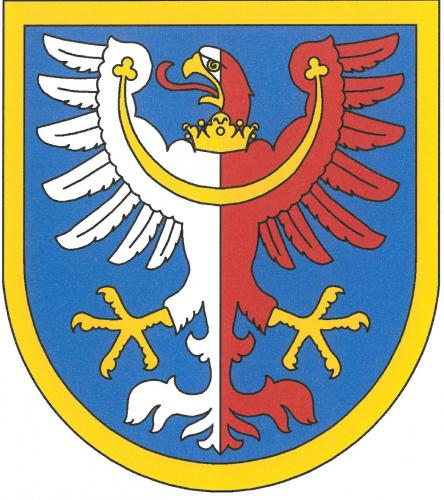
- Flag Coat of arms

- Location in the Czech Republic
- Coordinates: 50°15′13″N 13°46′28″E
- Country: Czech Republic
- Region: Ústí nad Labem
- District: Louny
- First mentioned: 1352

Area
  - Total: 12.52 km^{2} (4.83 sq mi)
- Elevation: 441 m (1,447 ft)

Population (2026-01-01)
  - Total: 587
  - Density: 46.9/km^{2} (121/sq mi)
- Time zone: UTC+1 (CET)
  - Summer (DST): UTC+2 (CEST)
- Postal codes: 439 67, 440 01
- Website: www.obec-rocov.cz

Ročov (Czech pronunciation: [ˈrotʃof]; German: Rotschow, Rotschau) is a market town in Louny District in the Ústí nad Labem Region of the Czech Republic. It has about 600 inhabitants.

== Administrative division ==
Ročov consists of three municipal parts (in brackets population according to the 2021 census):

- Ročov (448)
- Břínkov (53)
- Úlovice (57)

== Etymology ==
The name is derived from the personal name Roč, meaning "Roč's (court)". Roč was probably a shortened form of Rostislav or Roman.

== Geography ==
Ročov is located about 11 kilometres (7 mi) south of Louny and 45 km (28 mi) northwest of Prague. It lies in the Džbán range. The highest point is at 481 m (1,578 ft) above sea level.

== History ==
The first written mention of Ročov is from 1352, when Albrecht of Kolowrat founded here a market town.

== Demographics ==
Historical population

Year	Pop.	±%
1869	1,174	—
1880	1,269	+8.1%
1890	1,326	+4.5%
1900	1,486	+12.1%
1910	1,441	−3.0%

Year	Pop.	±%
1921	1,355	−6.0%
1930	1,306	−3.6%
1950	923	−29.3%
1961	793	−14.1%
1970	749	−5.5%

Year	Pop.	±%
1980	633	−15.5%
1991	568	−10.3%
2001	572	+0.7%
2011	531	−7.2%
2021	558	+5.1%

Source: Censuses

== Transport ==
There are no railways or major roads passing through the municipality.

== Sights ==
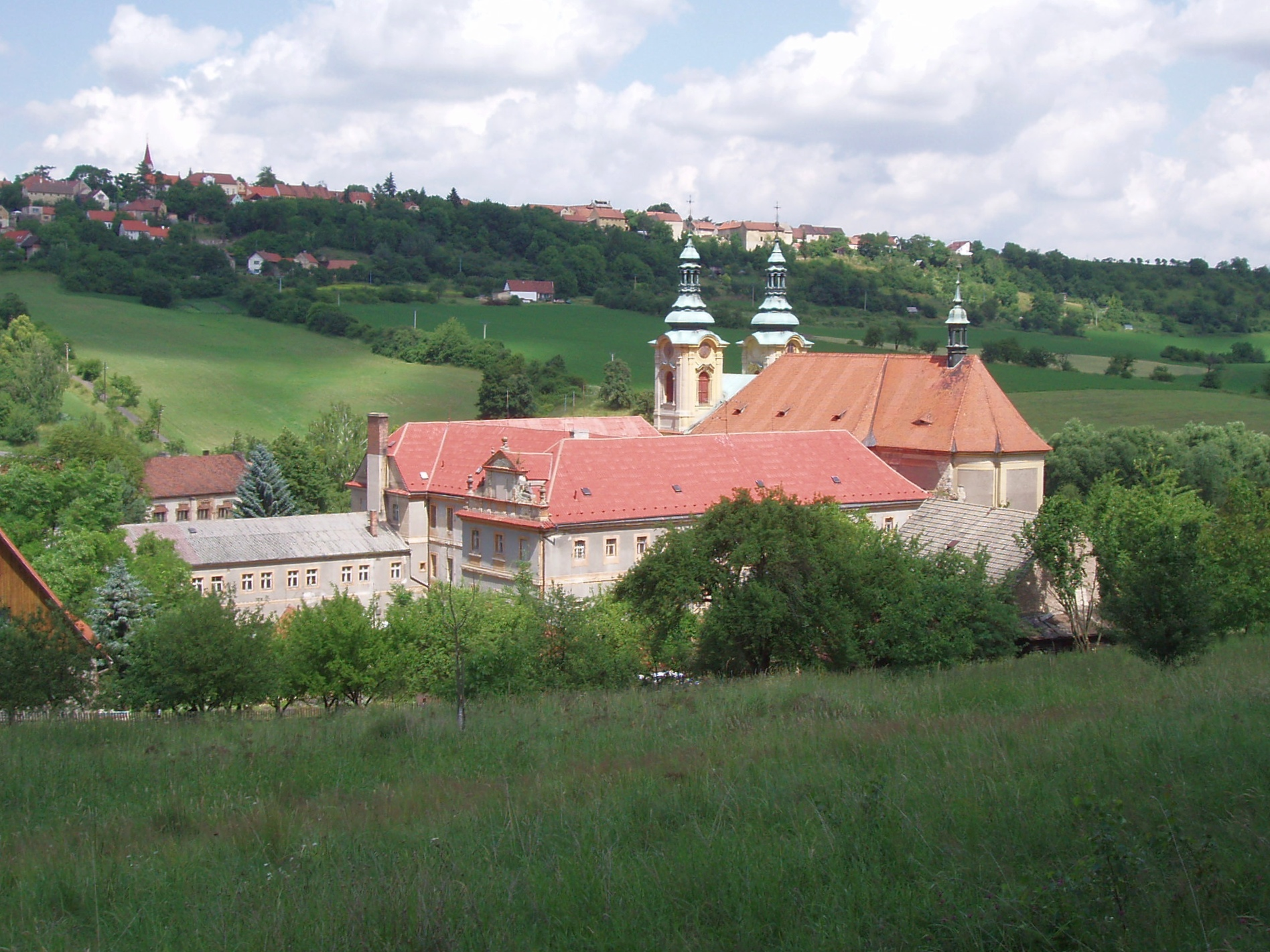
Augustinian monastery

The Augustinian monastery was built in the Baroque style in 1746–1765 on the site of an old Gothic church from 1373. It was designed by Kilian Ignaz Dientzenhofer. After his death, the architect Anselmo Lurago took over the construction.

Next to the church is the Church of the Assumption of the Virgin Mary. It was built in the neo-Gothic style in 1876–1883, after the old Baroque church was demolished in 1875. It is the main landmark of Ročov.

== Twin towns – sister cities ==
Ročov is twinned with:

- Reichenbach im Vogtland, Germany
