= Thomas Feist =

German politician

Thomas Wolfgang Feist
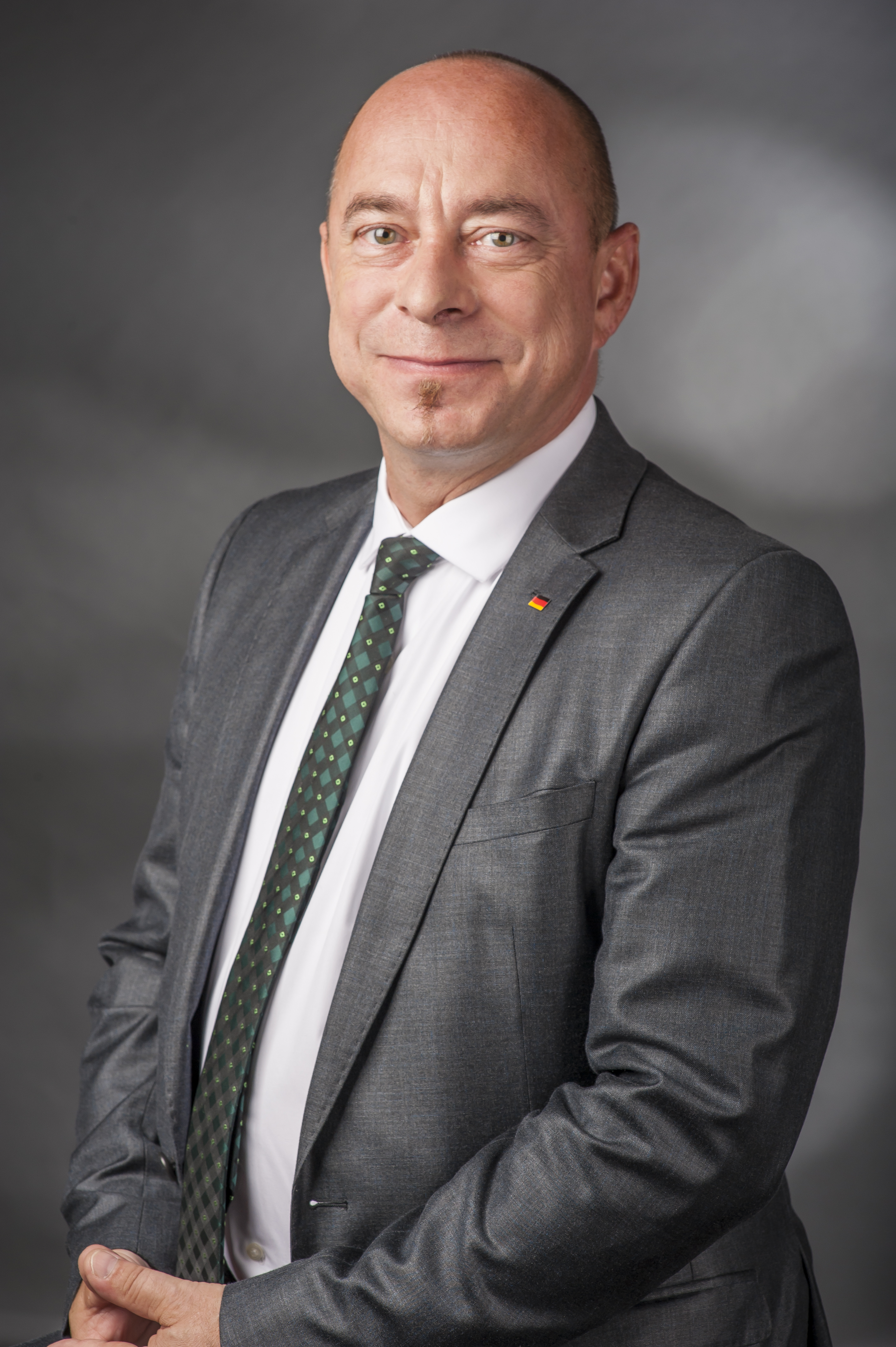
- Born: 8 April 1965 (age 60); Leipzig, Germany
- Occupations: politician, musicologist, cultural scientist

Thomas Wolfgang Feist (born 8 April 1965 in Leipzig, Germany) is a German politician (CDU) as well as musicologist and cultural scientist. He served as an advisor for cultural activities, intercultural cooperation and music at the Evangelical Church in Saxony and was also chairman of the Federal Association for cultural activities in the Evangelical Youth Movement, Bundesverband Kulturarbeit in der evangelischen Jugend (BKA).

== Political career ==
During the German federal election of 2009 Feist ran as a CDU candidate in the electoral district Leipzig II, which had previously been represented by Gunter Weißgerbe (SPD). Feist received a direct mandate to the Bundestag.

In the Bundestag's 17th legislative period, Feist served as a member of the Committee for Education, Research and Technology Assessment as well as the Subcommittee for Foreign Cultural and Education Policy. He was a representative in the committees for Petition and Foreign Relations. Feist is also a member of the Parliamentary Assembly of the Council of Europe, the European Assembly for Security and Defence, as well as the Assembly of the Western European Union. During his term Thomas Feist was a member of the parliamentary association German-Israeli Parliamentary Friendship Group and German-Iranian Parliamentary Friendship Group. In 2017 he lost his seat to Sören Pellmann (Die Linke).

He currently serves as the Saxonian appointee for Jewish everyday life.
