= Karl Julius Sillig =

German classical philologist and teacher (1801–1855)

- Born: 12 May 1801; Dresden, Saxony
- Died: 14 January 1855 (aged 53)
- Occupations: classical scholar writer

Karl Julius Sillig (12 May 1801 – 14 January 1855) was a German classics scholar, and pupil of Karl August Böttiger. Sillig went on to edit many of Böttiger's works after the latter's death in 1835. He also revised and edited the work of other scholars, such as Christian Gottlob Heyne. Heyne published an edition of the poem "Culex" from the Appendix Vergiliana, a collection of verse often attributed at least in part to Virgil, and attempted to cull the lines he thought not genuinely produced by Virgil; an approach of which Sillig was highly critical when he revised Heyne's works.

Born in Dresden, he studied at Leipzig and Göttingen, and was a schoolmaster at Dresden for the last thirty years of his life. His Catalogus Artificium (1827) was considered a useful work in its time. His edition of Catullus less so, although his edition of Pliny the Elder seems to have been well regarded. He was often referenced in works of 19th century classical scholarship, such as the Dictionary of Greek and Roman Biography and Mythology of William Smith. However, early 20th century critics felt that as an editor he was too much given to the accumulation of details, and was deficient in judgment and critical method.

== Works ==
- Catalogus Artificium (1827)
  - Dictionary of the Artists of Antiquity: architects, carvers, engravers, modellers, painters, sculptors, statuaries, and workers in bronze, gold, ivory, and silver, with three chronological tables; by Julius Sillig, tr. by the Rev. H. W. Williams, to which are added C. Plinii Secundi Naturalis historiae libri XXXIV-XXXVI. c. 8 [i.e.1]-5. With four indexes and a preface, by E. H. Barker. London: Black and Armstrong, 1837.
- P. Virgilii Maronis opera varietate lectionis et perpetua adnotatione illustratus. Vol. 4. Leipzig: Sumtibus Librariae Hahnianae (1832, revision of works of Christian Gottlob Heyne)
- Kleine Schriften (1837, editor)
- Opuscula (1837, editor)
