= Georg Lenck =

German musician

Georg Lenck (sometimes spelt Lembke) (7 November 1685 – 22 March 1744) was a German musician.

== Biography ==
Lenck was born in Reichenbach, Vogtland, Electorate of Saxony, and was Kantor at Laucha an der Unstrut, near Naumburg when he competed unsuccessfully for the post of Thomaskantor at Leipzig, which was eventually offered to Johann Sebastian Bach.

In 1725, he was appointed Kantor at Weissenfels, where he remained for the rest of his life.
