= Reichenbach im Vogtland =

Town in Saxony, Germany

- Town
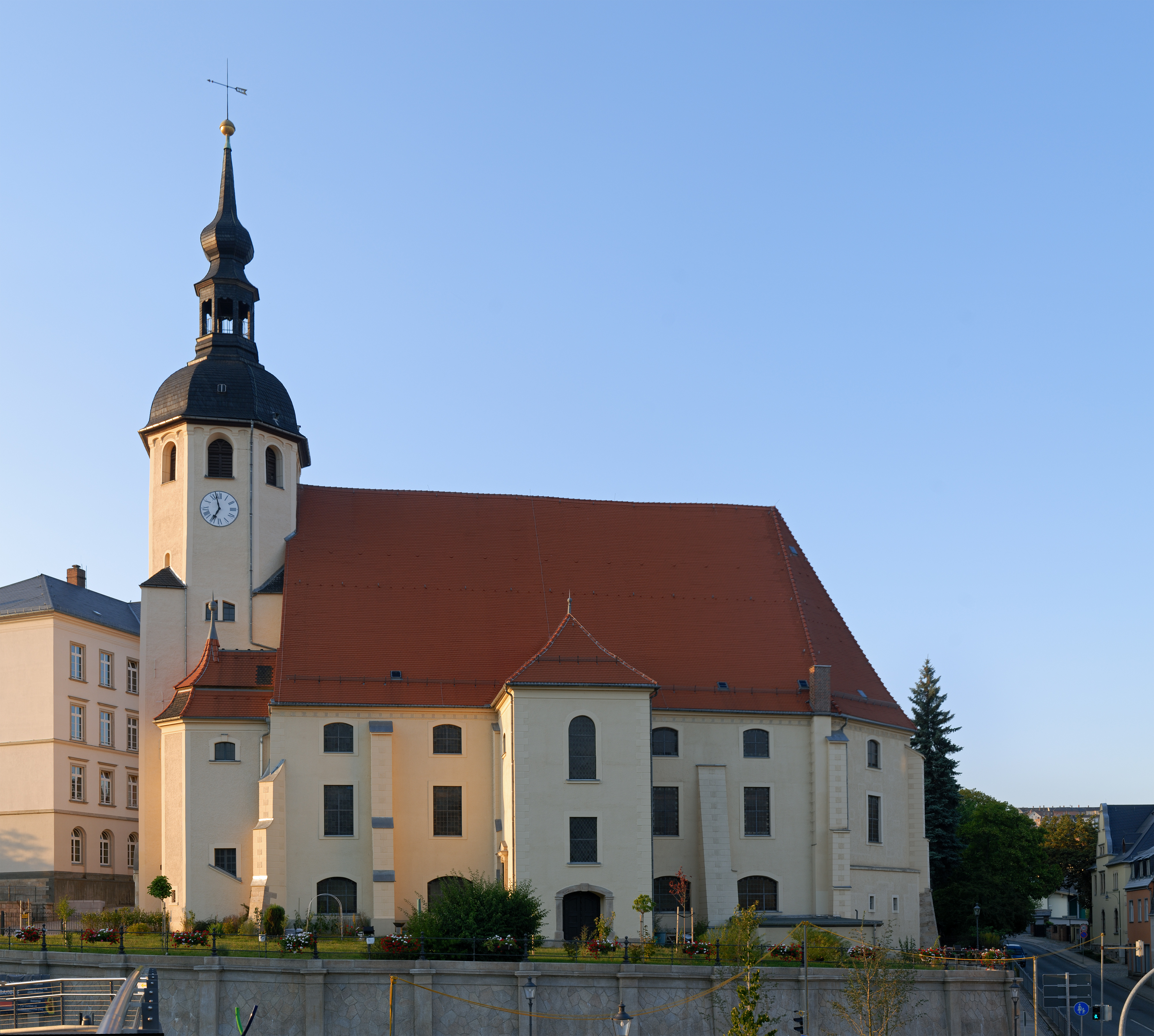
- Church of Saints Peter and Paul

- Coat of arms

- Location of Reichenbach im Vogtland within Vogtlandkreis district
- Interactive map of Reichenbach im Vogtland
- Location within Germany Location within Saxony
- Coordinates: 50°37′N 12°18′E
- Country: Germany
- State: Saxony
- District: Vogtlandkreis

Government
  - Mayor (2023–30): Henry Ruß (Left)

Area
  - Total: 34.46 km^{2} (13.31 sq mi)
- Elevation: 380 m (1,250 ft)

Population (2025-12-31)
  - Total: 19,510
  - Density: 566.2/km^{2} (1,466/sq mi)
- Time zone: UTC+01:00 (CET)
  - Summer (DST): UTC+02:00 (CEST)
- Postal codes: 08468, 08491 (Jägerhaus), 08499 (Mylau, Obermylau)
- Dialling codes: 03765
- Vehicle registration: V, AE, OVL, PL, RC
- Website: www.reichenbach-vogtland.de

Reichenbach im Vogtland (German pronunciation: [ˈʁaɪçn̩bax ʔɪm ˈfoːktlant], lit. 'Reichenbach in the Vogtland') is a town in the Vogtlandkreis district of Saxony in eastern Germany. With a population of 20,108, it is the second-largest town in the Vogtlandkreis after Plauen. It is located close to the A72 between Plauen (at c. 18 km) and Zwickau (at c. 19 km).

== History ==
The town of Reichenbach im Vogtland dates back to a settlement of the Franks and owes its early growth to its privileged situation in a valley close to Mylau Castle. In 1212, it was officially named Richenbach, possibly because of the many wetland basins (German: Bächen) located in what is today the old town. Reichenbach was granted town privileges around 1240 and mentioned in a 1271 decree as "civitatis richenbach", a town with autonomous rights to self-defence, trade, and municipal elections. Much of the Reichenbach history was lost in the town fires of 1720, 1773, and 1833. The foundations of the Ss. Peter and Paul parish church still date back to the 12th century.

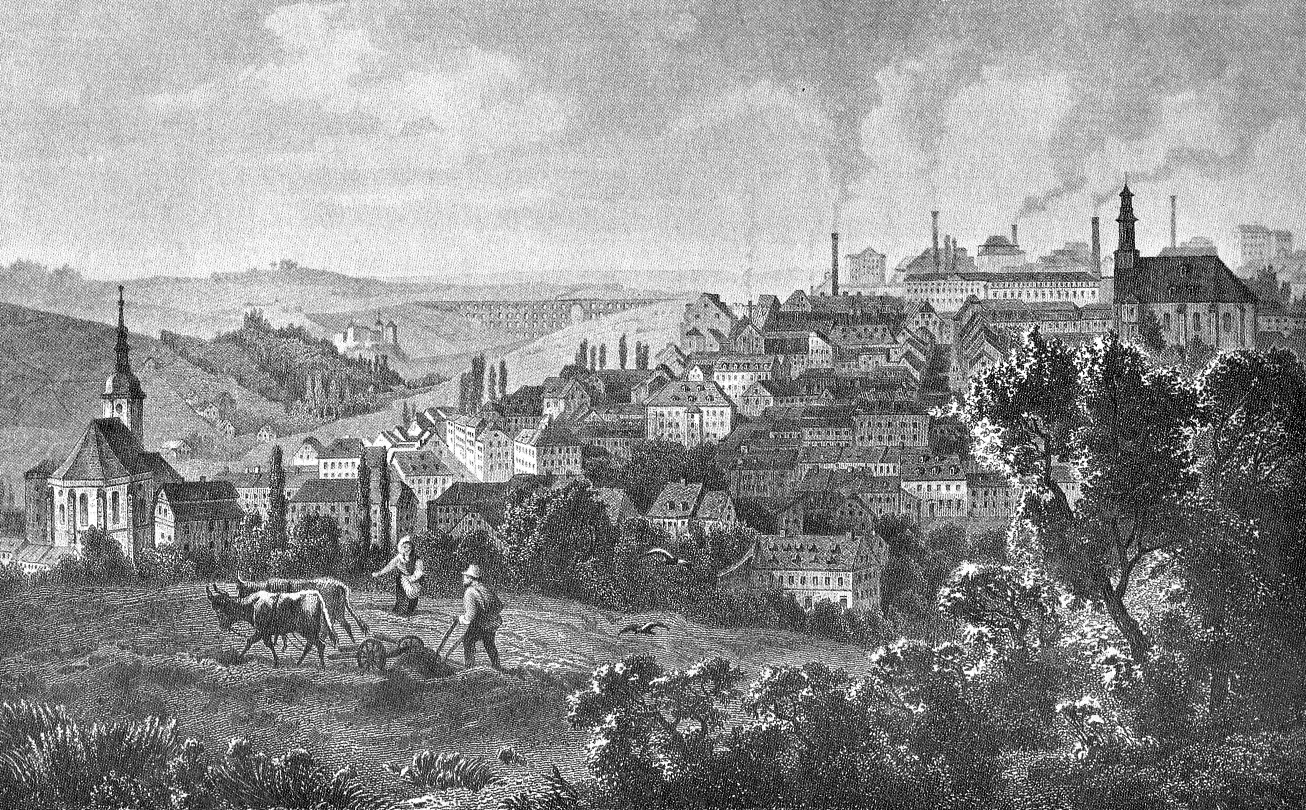
19th-century view of the town

The rise of industrialisation allowed the town to grow further, again promoted by its accessibility. Sewing and weaving were Reichenbach's main trades, but in the 19th century the metal working industry settled in the city and in the early 20th century, there was a rise of the pulp and paper industry and printing works. Some of Reichenbach's most remarkable structures date from this era, including its town hall (1837–1839), the railway station (1846), and world's largest brick bridge, the Göltzsch Viaduct (1846–1851).

Reichenbach im Vogtland has had a rather insignificant role in World War II. The town was the cremation site of many prisoners of various nationalities, who died in the subcamp of the Flossenbürg concentration camp located in nearby Lengenfeld. On March 21, 1945, American bombings killed 161 citizens and destroyed or damaged many buildings. Against the orders of the National Socialists, Mayor Otto Schreiber capitulated the town on April 17 without a fight. The town was occupied by American troops, who handed over control to the Red Army on July 1. About 120 innocent youth aged 15 and 16 were taken in custody and transferred to the Soviet Union's secret service (predecessor of the KGB), hoping all other citizens would be spared.

After Germany was split up, Reichenbach im Vogtland became part of East Germany. The population has since declined from nearly 35,000 to little over 20,000 today. As was the case with many former East German industrial cities, the 1991 German reunification caused many workers to lose their jobs and they started to move away. Many initiatives have since been deployed to rebuild the local economy. There are still many industrial buildings in Reichenbach with a high historic value, but with little appeal.

The administrative district of Reichenbach has grown since the early 20th century to include the quarters and villages of Brunn (1994), Cunsdorf (1924), Friesen (1994), Mylau (2016), Obermylau (2016), Oberreichenbach (1908), Rotschau (1996), and Schneidenbach (1999), and has had a collaborative relationship with Heinsdorfergrund since 2000. Schneidenbach joined on 1 January 1999, and Mylau on 1 January 2016.

== Historical population ==
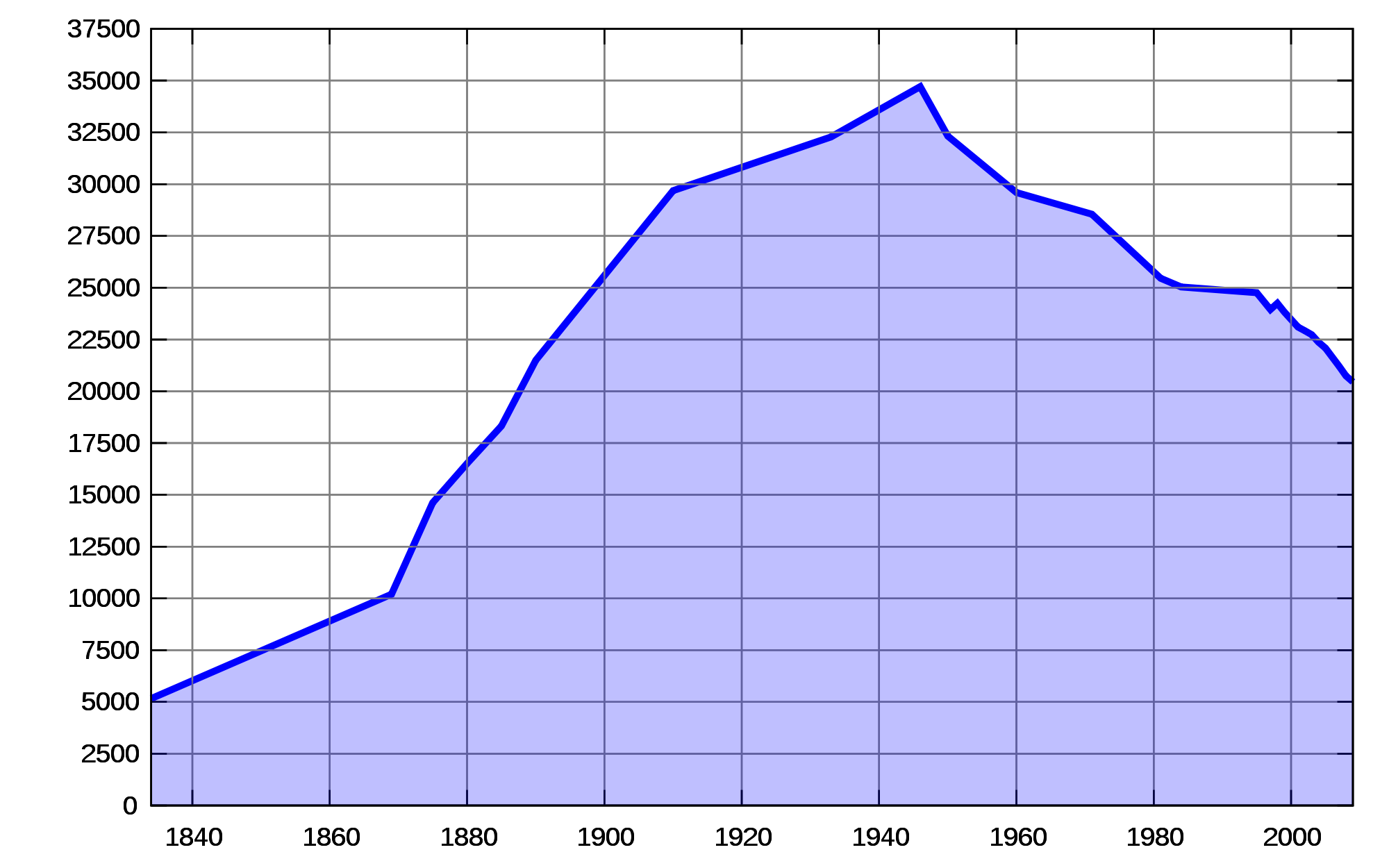
Historical population

- 1834 - 5,165
- 1869 - 10,200
- 1871 - 12,942
- 1875 - 14,620
- 1880 - 16,509
- 1885 - 18,320
- 1890 - 21,496
- 1910 - 29,685
- 1925 - 30,862
- 1933 - 32,276
- 1939 - 31,661
- 1946 - 34,708
- 1950 - 32,320
- 1960 - 29,598
- 1964 - 29,535
- 1971 - 28,545
- 1981 - 25,458
- 1984 - 25,033
- 1990 - 25,036
- 1998 - 24,251
- 1999 - 23,831
- 2000 - 23,469
- 2001 - 23,096
- 2002 - 22,923
- 2003 - 22,729
- 2004 - 22,371
- 2005 - 22,082
- 2007 - 21,210
- 2008 - 20,746
- 2009 - 20,449
- 2010 - 20,146
- 2011 - 19,836
- 2012 - 19,087
- 2013 - 18,879
- 2014 - 18,743
- 2022 - 20,018

== Sites of interest ==
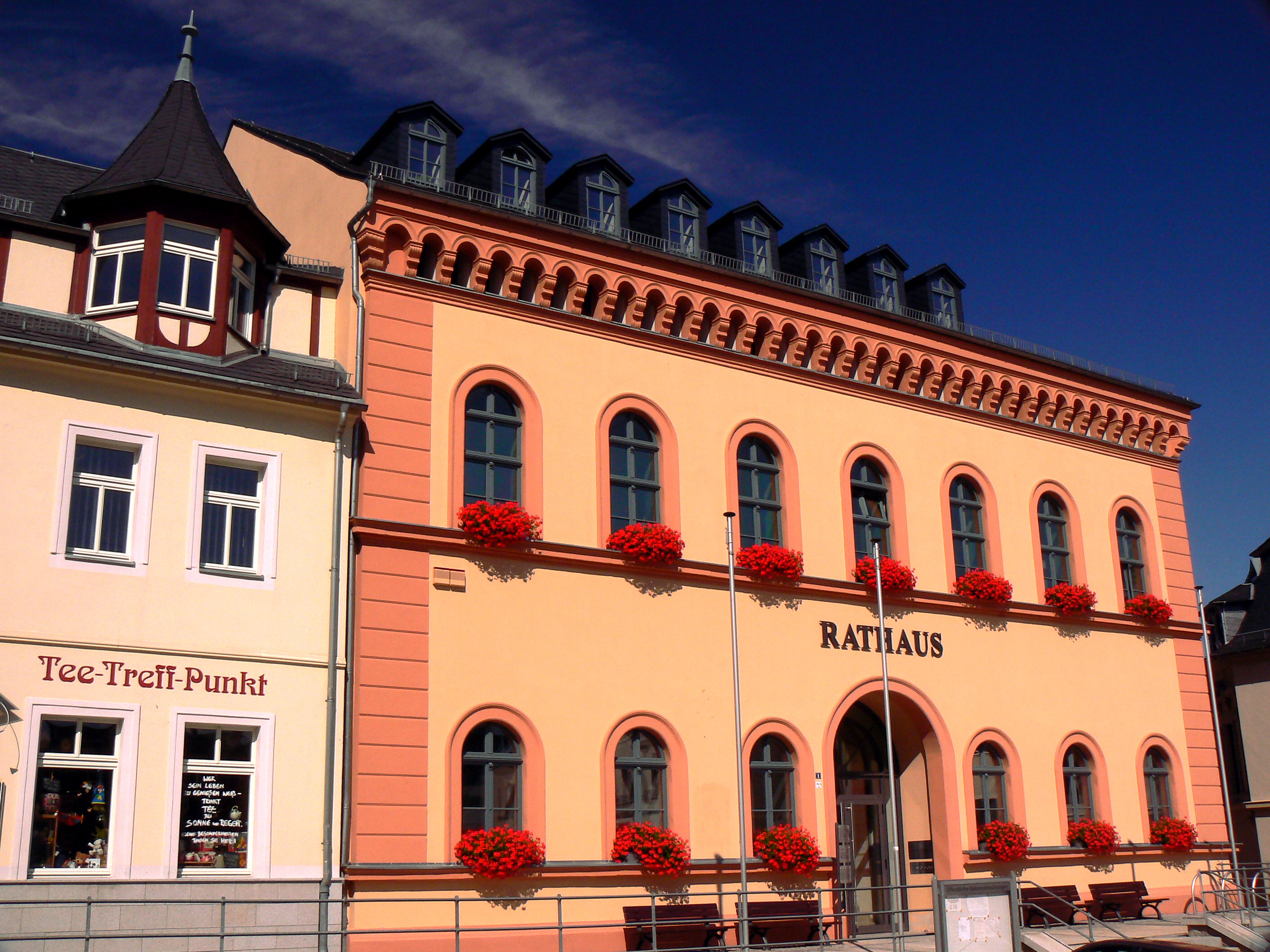
Town hall

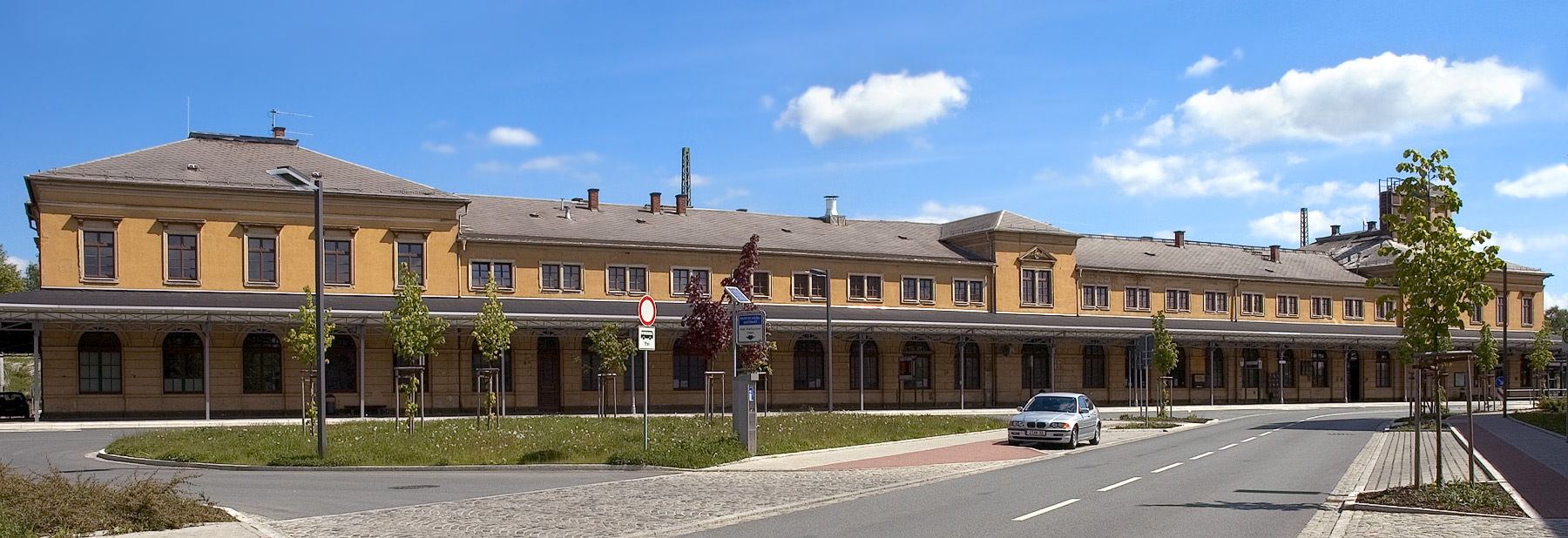
Reichenbach Oberer Bahnhof (upper station)

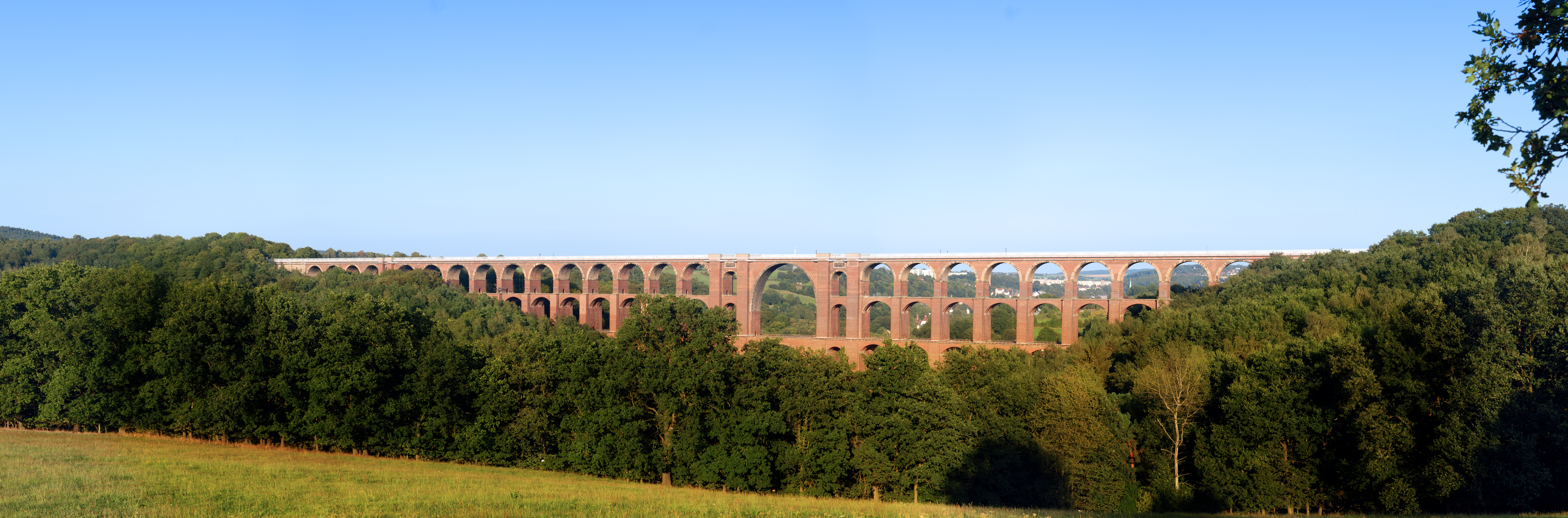
Göltzsch Viaduct

- Reichenbach is home to the Göltzsch Viaduct, the world's largest brick bridge, located about 4 km (2.5 mi) west of the town center spanning across the Reichenbach district of Mylau and the adjacent town of Netzschkau.

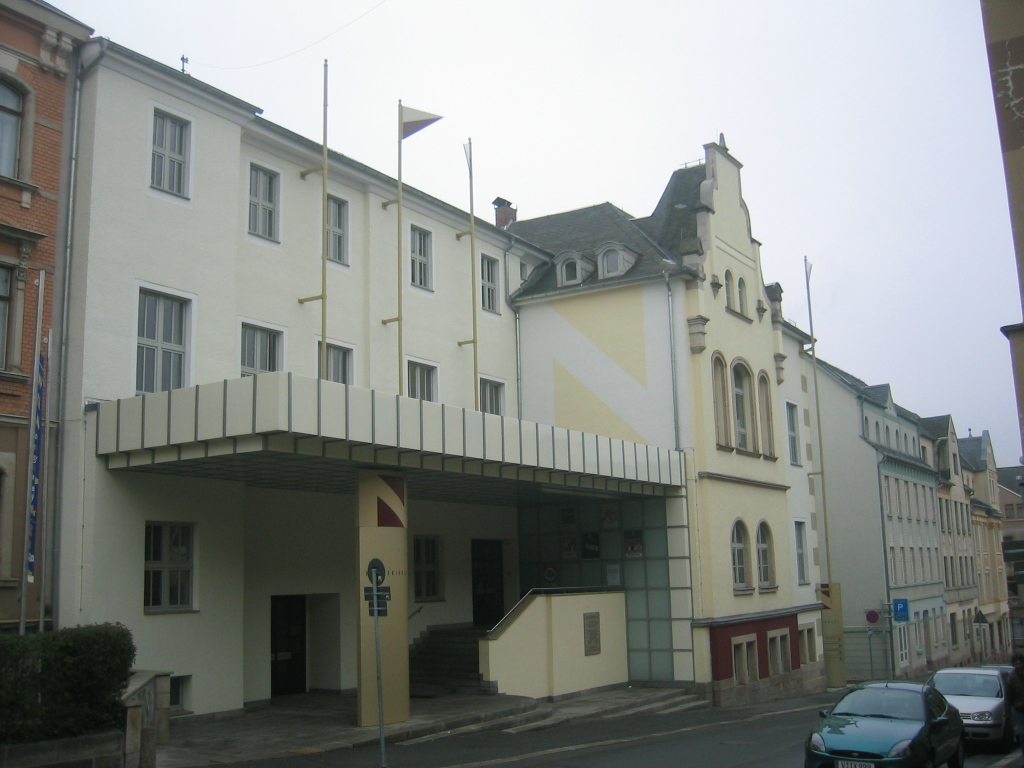
Neuberinhaus (museum, theatre and concert hall)

- The Neuberinhaus is a local historical and theatrical museum, named after the town's most famous citizen, actress Friederike Caroline Neuber (1697–1760), nicknamed "the Neuberin". Permanent expositions include her life and work, 18th century German theatre and the town's history.

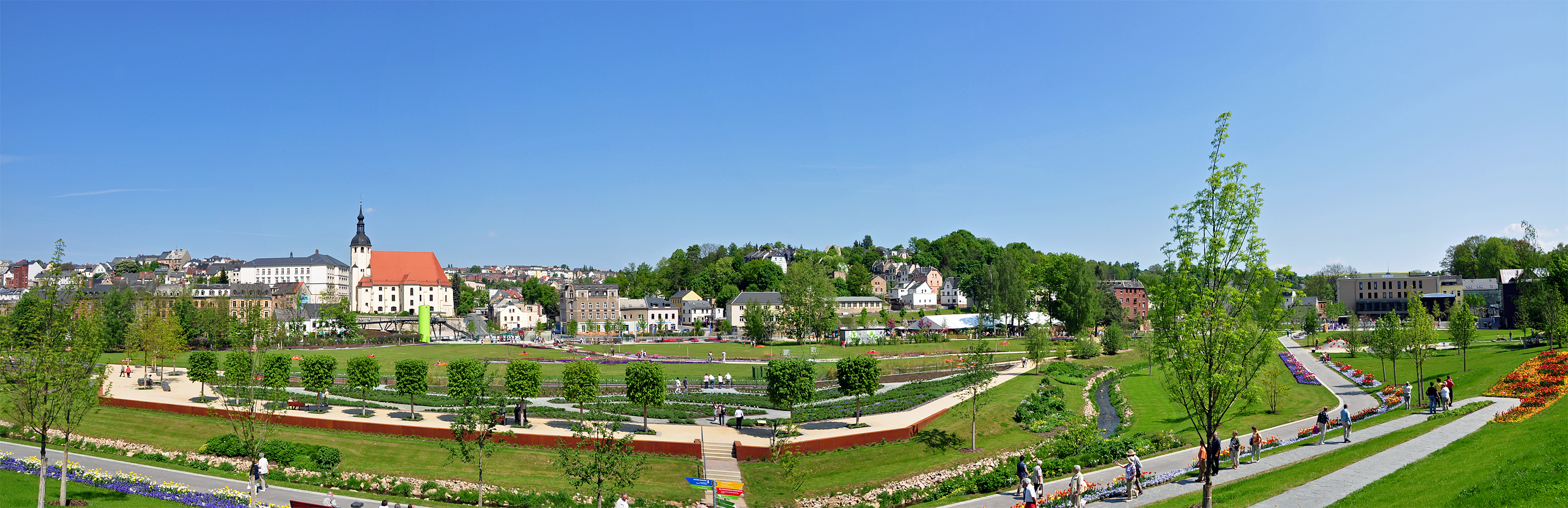
Overview over the 5th Saxon Landesgartenschau gardens

- The Park der Generationen (Park of Generations), the gardens of the 5th Saxon Landesgartenschau (horticultural show) held between May 1 and October 18, 2009.

== Communications ==
Reichenbach im Vogtland also has a telecommunication tower of Deutsche Telekom erected out of concrete, which includes a VHF broadcasting station for among others Vogtlandradio. It is not to be confused with the tower in Reichenbach (Oberlausitz) which transmits MDR Info at 1,188 kHz.

== Education ==
The Westsächsische Hochschule Zwickau - University of Applied Sciences Zwickau teaches architecture at bachelor and master level and Textile- and Leather Craftsmanship. The town also has a gymnasium, a middle school, three primary schools, and a special school for the physically and mentally challenged. Middle school students also attend schools in the surrounding towns.

== Twin towns – sister cities ==
Reichenbach im Vogtland is twinned with:

- Althen-des-Paluds, France
- Jędrzejów, Poland
- Karlštejn, Czech Republic
- Ma'alot-Tarshiha, Israel
- Montecarlo, Italy
- Nordhorn, Germany
- Ročov, Czech Republic
- Waldenbuch, Germany

== Notable people ==
- Josef Bachmann (1944–1970), activist
- Richard Benz (1884–1966), historian
- Karl Böttiger (1760–1835), archaeologist and classicist
- Fedor Flinzer (1832–1911), author, educator, and illustrator
- Willy Rudolf Foerster (1905–1966), engineer and industrialist in Japan who rescued Jews during the Holocaust
- Alban Förster (1849–1916), composer and conductor
- Jürgen Fuchs (1950–1999), author and dissident
- August Horch (1868–1951), automobile pioneer
- Johann Friedrich Krause (1770–1832), theologian
- Rudolf Krause (1907–1987), racing driver
- Johann Friedrich Krause (1770–1820), theologian
- Georg Lenck (1685–1744), musician
- Friederike Caroline Neuber (1697–1760), actor and director
- Wolfgang Mattheuer (1927–2004), painter, graphic artist, sculptor
- Karl Nitz (born 1938), judoka
- Nadja Sthamer (born 1990), politician
- Henry Stöhr (born 1960), judoka
- Manfred Winter (born 1954), speed skater
