= Alban Förster =

German composer (1849–1916)

Alban Förster (October 23, 1849 - January 18, 1916) was a German composer and conductor.

== Life ==
A native of Reichenbach im Vogtland, he studied at the Dresden Conservatory, where he later taught in 1881 and 1882. His opera The Maidens of Schilde, to a libretto by Rudolf Bunge, premiered in Dresden in 1889. His opera Lorle, to a libretto by Hans Heinrich Schefsky (a pseudonym of Victor von Falk), was premiered in the same city in 1891. He died at Neustrelitz, where he had been a court musician and later court conductor.

== Works (selection) ==
- Musikalisches Bilderbuch (for piano), Op. 9
- Piano Trio No. 2, Op. 61
- Für die Jugend (for piano), Op. 97
- Zwölf Tonbilder (for piano), Op. 138
- Vier heitere Männerchöre (choral), Op. 166
- Piano Trio No. 3, Op. 172
- Wollt ihr's hören? Six declamation pieces for piano, Op. 138
- Leichte Sonatine in F (Violin Sonata), Op. 200
- Symphony in E major (1888), WoO.
- Ouverture zu einem Lustspiel in B♭ major for winds and percussion, WoO.
