= Willy Rudolf Foerster =

Engineer and Industrialist

Willy Rudolf Foerster

Willy Rudolf Foerster (15 July 1905 – 19 February 1966) was a German engineer and industrialist in Japan who rescued Jews during the Holocaust. He founded the F. & K. Engineering Company and the German-Japanese Machine Tool Company, called Nichidoku Kikai Seisakujo, in Tokyo. Foerster was a leading industrialist and one of the richest foreigners in Japan.

== Early life ==
Born in Reichenbach im Vogtland, Germany in 1905, the son of a textile engineer. Studied mechanical engineering in Zwickau and Berlin and worked for both Krupp and BMW.

== War ==
=== Rescue of Jewish refugees ===
With the help of the "Jewish Refugee Committee" he employed a sizable number of Jewish refugees from Germany and the occupied territories in his company. Being anti-Nazi, he organized, together with the "Jewish Refugee Committee" in Tokyo, the entry of his new employees and their families to Japan. Despite the enormous pressure of the Nazi party and the German missions abroad in Tokyo and Yokohama, he refused to dismiss his staff members. Publicly he dissociated himself from National Socialist policy and called himself a "stateless person".

Hans Alexander Straus (Columbia Records) and Karl Rosenberg (Liebermann-Waelchli & Co.) in Tokyo, who organized the committee, received application documents from persecuted Jews in Germany and the German-occupied territories which they forwarded to Foerster. Foerster then provided a free passage to Japan. The family men worked at Foerster's company and their children attended school. In this way, a sizable number of Jewish refugees from Germany, Austria, and other countries, such as Czechoslovakia, came to Japan. In a letter written in 1939 to a stateless Jewish engineer in Germany, who had lost his job because of his Jewish descent, Rosenberg described Foerster as a man of "extraordinary independence, full of character and without prejudice". But even though the engineer was able to provide a passport without imprinted "J" and an employment contract with Foerster's company, the Japanese denied the entry of the family. But Foerster – as Rosenberg described – "worked desperately" to get a permission for the family to enter Japan. At last, like in other cases, he was successful. Shortly afterwards Rosenberg noted overjoyed, that Foerster was able, "despite extreme difficulties", to convince the Japanese authorities. Several other cases are documented. At the end of 1940, Foerster saved the children of one of his employees in Vienna from deportation to a concentration camp. Some months after their arrival in Japan they were deprived of citizenship by the German consulate in Yokohama. But Foerster was able to prevent the deportation of the whole family to the Shanghai Ghetto at the very last moment.

=== Defamation as an alleged criminal by German diplomats ===
Because of his resistance work, Foerster was defamed as an alleged criminal by German diplomats in Tokyo and Yokohama. For this purpose, they used a forged criminal record, which they spread in the German community. After the war, it was also handed over by the Japanese to the Allied Forces in Japan to discredit Foerster. It was based on the criminal record of a namesake of Foerster. This man was imprisoned several times in Germany for theft, dealing with stolen goods, and sexual crimes. He was born in 1890 in Reichenbrand near Chemnitz and not in 1905 in Reichenbach in the Vogtland. His records clearly show that he was imprisoned from 23 July 1937 until 23 June 1938 in the prison of Hoheneck in Germany. At this time Foerster was already living in Japan for years as a successful businessman. But later SCAP included the forged criminal record into the Foerster-file, which led, in combination with false statements of interested parties, e. g. former officials, to the destruction of Foerster's credibility.

=== Arrest ===
Because of his strong opposition against National Socialist policies and anti-Semitism he, his Japanese wife Hideko Foerster, and several employees were arrested on 24 May 1943 by the Japanese Kenpeitai at the instigation of German authorities, who fraudulently denounced him as a "Soviet spy". Foerster was tortured (also by Josef Meisinger) and forced to sell his factory to a Japanese company. He was imprisoned for more than a year and released on 13 June 1944. Foerster was acquitted on being a "spy" by a Japanese court, but he was sentenced to probation because of anti-war propaganda and stirring up the public. Some days later he was placed under house arrest.

On 17 May 1945, Foerster was arrested again as an "anti-Nazi" element, at the instigation of Meisinger. Together with Jews from Germany and Allied citizens (e. g. Catholic nuns) he was interned at Tokyo Koishikawa. Foerster was elected spokesman and supplied the detainees with additional food rations, which he purchased with the help of a German woman, who was married to an Indian citizen. At the time of the great bombing of Tokyo, during the night of 25 to 26 May 1945, it was largely thanks to him that the inmates left the camp alive. Foerster disarmed the guard and helped the internees out of the burning house. On 15 August 1945, the camp was liberated by American forces.

== Post-war ==
=== Results of SCAP / CIC investigations ===
After the war, Foerster and his family lived at Lake Nojiri where he owned a house. The Allied forces in Japan carried out extensive investigations. Former German diplomats and others were interrogated. SCAP-files on Foerster show that interested parties were able to discredit him. Internal investigations of the Counter Intelligence Corps (CIC) revealed that Foerster was a sincere "anti-Nazi", who employed Jewish refugees in his company and was therefore regarded as "persona non grata" by German authorities. It was determined that Foerster was accused of anti-war propaganda, arrested twice as "anti-Nazi", and that he was denounced by the "Butcher of Warsaw", Josef Meisinger, to Japanese authorities.

=== Expropriation and forced repatriation to Germany ===
Despite these results and the fact that Foerster had been a stateless person since 1936, his property in Japan was expropriated and he was deported to Germany as an alleged Nazi, together with his wife and their daughter. Jewish friends who tried to help him were told that they were "only stateless foreigners", that Foerster "lies whenever he opens his mouth" and that he "never was arrested because of political terms". It was also mentioned that it could be dangerous for them to interfere in Foerster's case.

=== Results of German court investigations ===
Back in Germany, it took nearly twenty years for German courts to come to the same conclusions as the CIC did before Foerster's forceful repatriation. After questioning many witnesses, the judges of the higher regional court in Frankfurt am Main decided that Foerster had been persecuted by Meisinger because of his antagonism to National Socialism and his resistance work, especially the employment of Jewish refugees. The court also stated that Meisinger had fraudulently denounced Foerster as a "spy", knowing that the Japanese would at the very least detain him for a long time. The judges declared that Meisinger had used the Japanese as an "instrument" of persecution. A few months after this decision, Foerster died. He was never rehabilitated publicly.

On 28 August 2018, the biography of Willy Rudolf Foerster, the ″Schindler″ of Tokyo, was publicly presented at the Haus der Geschichte in Bonn. In a lecture, the author Clemens Jochem presented individual biographies of Jewish employees rescued by Foerster, photos, and essential new documents relating to the Foerster case.

== Sources ==
=== Books ===
- Jochem, Clemens (2017). Der Fall Foerster: Die deutsch-japanische Maschinenfabrik in Tokio und das Jüdische Hilfskomitee. Berlin: Hentrich & Hentrich. ISBN 978-3-95565-225-8.
- Rotner Sakamoto, Pamela (1998). Japanese Diplomats and Jewish Refugees: A World War II Dilemma. Westport: Praeger. p. 93. ISBN 0-275-96199-0.
- Petroff, Serge P. (2008). Life Journey: A Family Memoir. Bloomington: iUniverse. ISBN 978-0-595-51115-0. [Memoirs of an employee of Foerster. Petroff provides, except some inaccuracies (e. g. date of Foerster's arrest), an authentic insight into Foerster's anti-Nazi attitude, his persecution by the Gestapo and his arrest and expropriation by Japanese authorities.]

=== Journals ===
- Jochem, Clemens (December 2017). "Menschlich mutig. Der Industrielle Willy Rudolf Foerster in Tokio" [Humanly courageous. The industrialist Willy Rudolf Foerster in Tokyo]. StuDeO-INFO (in German) (12/2017): 40–42. ISSN 1866-6434.
- Menkhaus, Heinrich (January 2018). "Buchvorstellung: Clemens Jochem: Der Fall Foerster. Die deutsch-japanische Maschinenfabrik in Tokio und das jüdische Hilfskomitee" [Book review: Clemens Jochem: The Case Foerster. The German-Japanese Machine Tool Company in Tokyo and the Jewish Refugees Committee]. OAG Notizen (in German) (1/2018): 56–58. ISSN 1343-408X.
- Weissleder, Dirk (1 December 2017). "Genealogisch-biographische Datenbank für deutsche Kriegsgefangene in Japan" (PDF). Mitteilungen Institut für Personengeschichte (in German) (2/2017): 15–17. ISSN 2509-2286.
- Möckel, Gerd (23 January 2018). "Fast vergessen: Reichenbacher rettete Juden in Japan das Leben" [Almost forgotten: Reichenbacher saved the lives of Jews in Japan]. Freie Presse (in German).
- Möckel, Gerd (27 January 2018). "Reichenbach will Foerster würdigen" [Reichenbach wants to honor Foerster]. Freie Presse (in German).
- Luley, Björn (1 June 2018). "Ein Aufrechter in Japan" [An honest man in Japan]. Informationen. Wissenschaftliche Zeitschrift des Studienkreises Deutscher Widerstand 1933-1945 (in German) (87): 43. ISSN 0938-8672. Archived from the original on 30 April 2018.
- Bellanger, Jean-Luc (1 July 2018). "Un homme d'affaires. Tribulations d'un industriel allemand antinazi au Japon puis en Allemagne entre 1931 et 1966" [A businessman. Tribulation of a German anti-Nazi industrialist in Japan later in Germany between 1931 and 1966]. Le Patriote Résistant (in French) (932): 12–14. ISSN 0223-3150.
- Warszawski, Nathan (7 November 2018). "In Erinnerung an den anständigen Deutschen Willy Rudolf Foerster" [In memory of the honourable German Willy Rudolf Foerster]. Tabularasa Zeitung für Gesellschaft und Kultur (in German).
- Grunberg, Liane (30 May 2019). "The Untold Story of Japan's Oskar Schindler". Tablet Magazine.
- Bistrovic, Miriam (1 June 2019). "Rezension: Der Fall Foerster. Die deutsch-japanische Maschinenfabrik in Tokio und das Jüdische Hilfskomitee" [Book review: The Case Foerster. The German-Japanese Machine Tool Company in Tokyo and the Jewish Refugees Committee]. Zeitschrift für Geschichtswissenschaft. 67 (6): 586–588. ISSN 0044-2828.
- Grunberg, Liane (17 August 2019). "杉原千畝ではない「日本のシンドラー」の知られざる物語". Courrier Japon.
- Grunberg, Liane (18 October 2026). "The forgotten German who saved Jews in Japan - and the diary that resurfaced 80 years later". The Jerusalem Post.

=== Additional publications ===
- Jochem, Clemens (2026): Part 0: "…one of the most objectionable and undesirable Germans in Japan."
- Jochem, Clemens (2026): Part 1: "Not to meddle"
- Jochem, Clemens (2026): Part 2: "A German of character, free of prejudice"
- Jochem, Clemens (2026): Part 3: "…that he came with Russian orders, and that the whole factory project was only a pretext"

=== Interviews / Oral History ===
- Interview with Margaret A. Bendahan, née Liebeskind, about her escape to Japan and her arrest and torture as an alleged "spy" at the instigation of German authorities. 27 August 1991, United States Holocaust Memorial Museum Collection. Mrs. Bendahan was a close friend of the Stern family, who was rescued by Willy Rudolf Foerster. He is mentioned several times in the interview: 01:42:00 - 01:47:00 h (part 1/2), 01:56:00 - 01:57:30 h (part 1/2), 00:12:00 - 00:18:00 (part 2/2). A sworn statement by Margaret Bendahan dated 30 March 1963 is quoted on pp. 94-95 in "Der Fall Foerster".
