= Karl Böttiger =

German archaeologist (1760–1835)

Karl August Böttiger
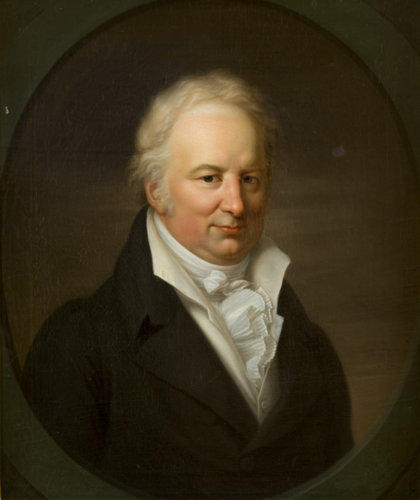
- Karl Böttiger. Painted by Gerhard von Kügelgen, ca 1812, Tartu University Library
- Born: 8 June 1760; Reichenbach
- Died: 17 November 1835 (aged 75); Dresden
- Occupations: Archaeologist and Classicist

Karl August Böttiger (8 June 1760 – 17 November 1835) was a German archaeologist and classicist, and a prominent member of the literary and artistic circles in Weimar and Jena.

== Biography ==
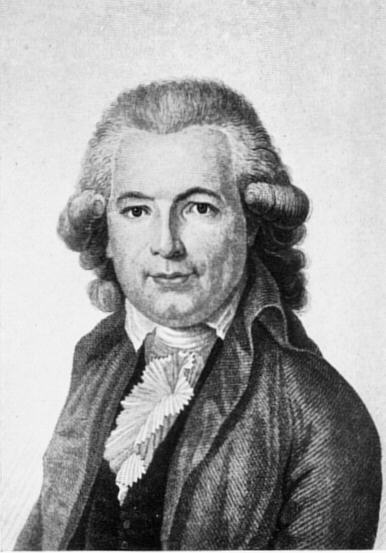
Karl Böttiger

Böttiger was born in Reichenbach, in the kingdom of Saxony, and educated at Schulpforta and Leipzig. Under the influence of Johann Gottfried Herder, he was for 13 years headmaster at the gymnasium and consistorial councillor in Weimar, from 1790 to 1804. For the remaining 31 years of his life, he resided at Dresden as director of the Museum of Antiquities, and was active as a journalist and public lecturer. As a schoolmaster, he had published a considerable number of pedagogic and philological programs. In 1810, Böttiger with Swiss painter Heinrich Meyer released a monograph on the painting in the Vatican known as the "Aldobrandini marriage". His archaeological works, mainly produced at Dresden, fall into three groups:

The first of these is private antiquities, best represented by his Sabina, or morning scenes in the dressing room of a wealthy Roman lady (German: Sabina, oder Morgenszenen im Putzzimmer einer reichen Römerin; 1803, 2 vols.; 2nd edition, 1806), which was translated into French and served as a model for Wilhelm Adolf Becker's Gallus and Charicles. The second, the Greek theatre, which Böttiger had been interested in since his time as a drama critic in Weimar; his unfavorable review of August Wilhelm Schlegel's Ion was withdrawn at the request of Goethe. It was mainly as a schoolmaster in Weimar that he wrote his papers on the distribution of the parts, on the masks and dresses, and on the machinery of the ancient stage, as well as a dissertation on the masks of the Furies in 1801. Thirdly, he worked in the domain of ancient art and mythology; his work in this area was popular but, according to some 20th-century critics, superficial.

His accomplishments in Dresden led him to be noticed by the court of the Kingdom of Saxony, and he was the Aulic councilor of the kings of Saxony. Böttiger supplied the descriptive letter-press to the 1797 German edition of Tischbein's reproductions from William Hamilton's second collection of Greek vases, and thus introduced the study of Greek vase-painting into Germany. He published lectures on the history of ancient sculpture in 1806, and painting in 1811, and edited the three volumes of an archaeological periodical called Amalthea from 1820 to 1825, which included contributions from the most eminent classical archaeologists of the day.

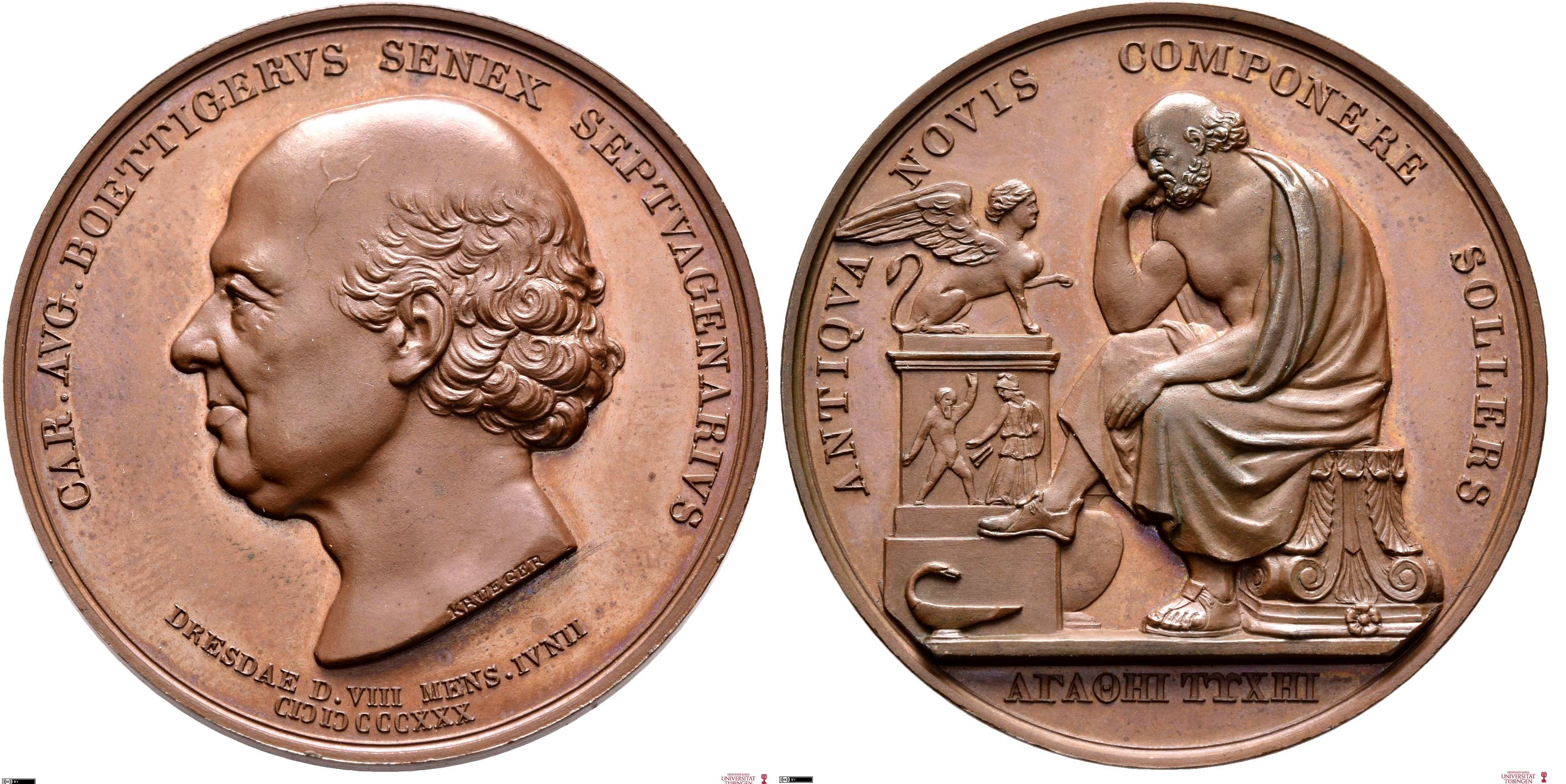
Medal Karl August Böttiger 1830

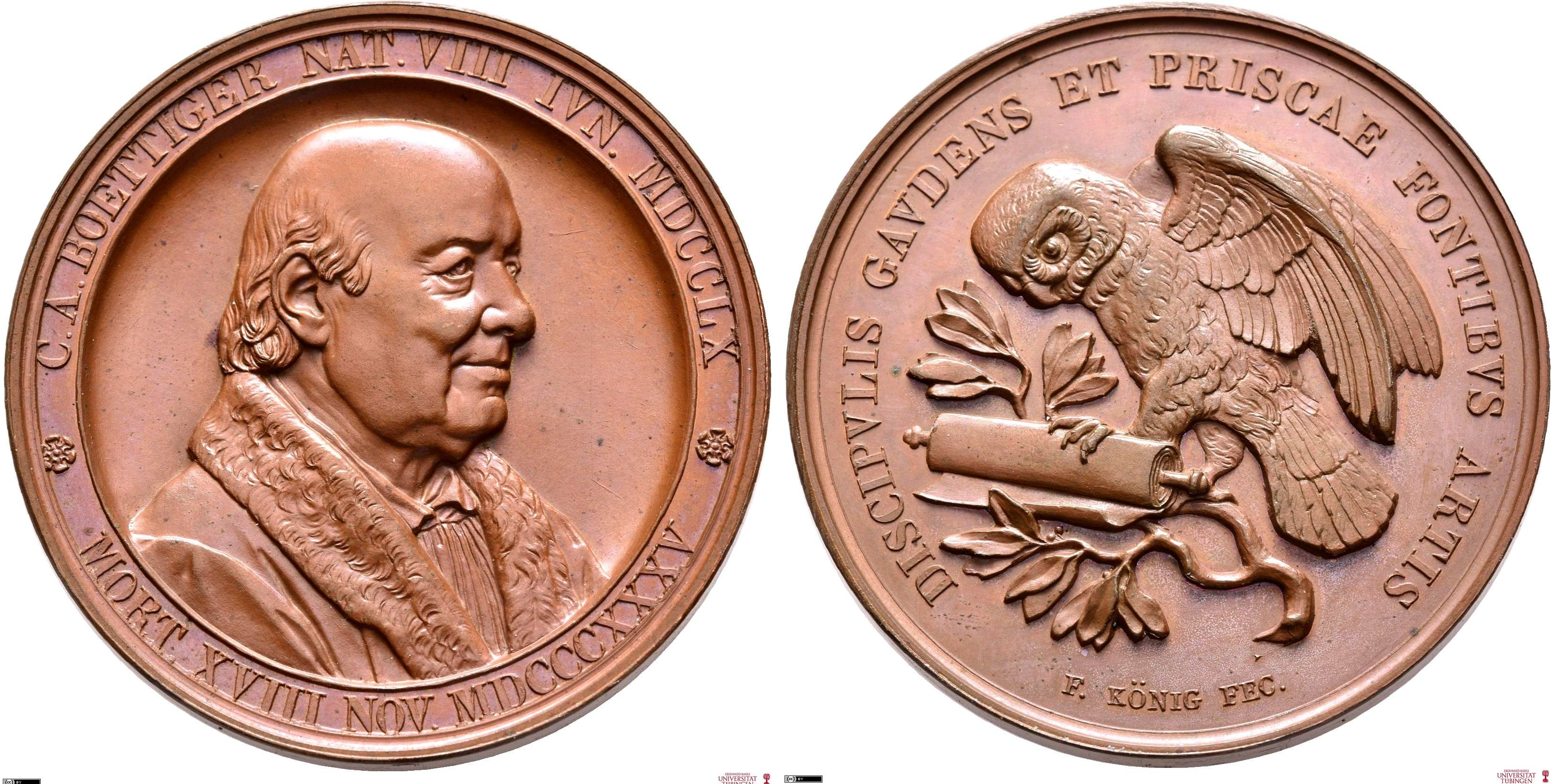
Medal Karl August Böttiger 1835

In 1832 Böttiger was elected a member of the French Institute. He died in Dresden. His pupil, who edited many of Böttiger's works after his death, was the German classicist Karl Julius Sillig. There are two medals that were commissioned for him. One on the occasion of his 70th birthday in 1830 and the other after he died.

His son, Karl Wilhelm Böttiger (15 August 1790 – 26 November 1862; not to be confused with the Swedish writer Carl Wilhelm Böttiger), was a historian and biographer of his father. He wrote Karl August Böttiger. Eine biographische Skizze, a biographical sketch (Leipzig, 1837). From his father's papers, he edited the posthumous work Litterarische Zustände und Zeitgenossen (Literary circumstances and contemporaries, 2 vols., Leipzig, 1838). Karl Wilhelm Böttiger contributed the history of Saxony to Heeren and Ukert's Europäische Staatengeschichte, and his Allgemeine Geschichte für Schule und Haus (Universal history for school and home) and Deutsche Geschichte für Schule und Haus (German history for school and home) passed through many editions. From 1821 until his death he was professor of history in Erlangen.

== Works ==
- Griechische Vasengemälde (1797–1800)
- Ideen zur Archäologie der Malerei, i. (1811)
- Kunstmythologie (1811)
- Vorlesungen und Aufsätze zur Alterthumskunde (1817)
- Amalthea (1821–1825)
- Ideen zur Kunstmythologie (1826–1836)
- Opuscula et Carmine Latino (1837)
- Kleine Schriften, includes a complete 56-page list of his works (1837–1838)
