= Nadja Sthamer =

German politician (born 1990)

Member of the Bundestag
- Incumbent
- Assumed office 2021

Personal details
- Born: 13 March 1990 (age 36) Reichenbach im Vogtland, East Germany (now Germany)
- Party: SPD
- Education: Leipzig University

Nadja Sthamer (born 13 March 1990) is a German politician of the Social Democratic Party (SPD) who has been serving as a member of the Bundestag since 2021.

== Early life and education ==
Sthamer was born 1990 in the East German town of Reichenbach im Vogtland and moved to Leipzig in 2008. She studied political science and religious studies at the Leipzig University. During her studies, she completed internships at the offices of Friedrich Ebert Foundation (FES) in Addis Ababa (2012) and Kyiv (2013).

== Political career ==
Sthamer became a member of the Bundestag in the 2021 election, representing the Leipzig II district.

In parliament, Sthamer has since been serving on the Committee on Economic Cooperation and Development and the Committee on Human Rights and Humanitarian Aid.

In addition to her committee assignments, Sthamer has been one of the founding members of a cross-party group promoting a One Health approach since 2022.

== Other activities ==
- German Institute for Development Evaluation (DEval), Alternate Member of the advisory board (since 2022)
- German Federation for the Environment and Nature Conservation (BUND), Member (since 2019)
- German United Services Trade Union (ver.di), Member (since 2013)
