= Leipzig II =

Federal electoral district of Germany

152 Leipzig II
- Electoral district for the Bundestag
- Leipzig II in 2025
- State: Saxony
- Population: 300,000 (2019)
- Electorate: 231,178 (2021)
- Major settlements: Leipzig (partial)
- Area: 128.0 km^{2}

Current electoral district
- Created: 1990
- Party: LINKE
- Member: Sören Pellmann
- Elected: 2017, 2021, 2025

Leipzig II is an electoral constituency (German: Wahlkreis) represented in the Bundestag. It elects one member via first-past-the-post voting. Under the current constituency numbering system, it is designated as constituency 152. It is located in northwestern Saxony, comprising the southern part of the city of Leipzig.

Leipzig II was created for the inaugural 1990 federal election after German reunification. Since 2017, it has been represented by Sören Pellmann of The Left.

== Geography ==
Leipzig II is located in northwestern Saxony. As of the 2021 federal election, it comprises the city districts (Stadtbezirke) of Mitte, Süd, Südost, Südwest, and West from the independent city of Leipzig.

== History ==
Leipzig II was created after German reunification in 1990. In the 1990 through 1998 elections, it was constituency 310 in the numbering system. From 2002 through 2009, it was number 154. In the 2013 through 2021 elections, it was number 153. From the 2025 election, it has been number 152.

Originally, the constituency comprised the Stadtbezirke of Süd-Ost, Süd, Süd-West, and West II from the independent city of Leipzig. It acquired its current borders in the 2002 election.

Election	No.	Name	Borders
1990	310	Leipzig II	Leipzig city (only Süd-Ost, Süd, Süd-West, and West II Stadtbezirke)
1994	310	Leipzig II	Leipzig city (only Süd-Ost, Süd, Süd-West, and West II Stadtbezirke)
1998	310	Leipzig II	Leipzig city (only Süd-Ost, Süd, Süd-West, and West II Stadtbezirke)
2002	154	Leipzig II	Leipzig city (only Mitte, Süd, Südost, Südwest, and West Stadtbezirke)
2005	154	Leipzig II	Leipzig city (only Mitte, Süd, Südost, Südwest, and West Stadtbezirke)
2009	154	Leipzig II	Leipzig city (only Mitte, Süd, Südost, Südwest, and West Stadtbezirke)
2013	153	Leipzig II	Leipzig city (only Mitte, Süd, Südost, Südwest, and West Stadtbezirke)
2017	153	Leipzig II	Leipzig city (only Mitte, Süd, Südost, Südwest, and West Stadtbezirke)
2021	153	Leipzig II	Leipzig city (only Mitte, Süd, Südost, Südwest, and West Stadtbezirke)
2025	152	Leipzig II	Leipzig city (only Mitte, Süd, Südost, Südwest, and West Stadtbezirke)

== Members ==
The constituency was first represented by Gerhard Schulz of the Christian Democratic Union (CDU) from 1990 to 1998. It was won by Gunter Weißgerber of the Social Democratic Party (SPD) in 1998 who represented it until 2009, when it was won by Thomas Feist of the CDU. Sören Pellmann of The Left was elected in 2017 and re-elected in 2021.

Election	Member	Party	%
1990	Gerhard Schulz	CDU	36.8
1994	Gerhard Schulz	CDU	36.1
1998	Gunter Weißgerber	SPD	36.7
2002	Gunter Weißgerber	SPD	39.9
2005	Gunter Weißgerber	SPD	35.3
2009	Thomas Feist	CDU	28.8
2013	Thomas Feist	CDU	34.3
2017	Sören Pellmann	LINKE	25.3
2021	Sören Pellmann	LINKE	22.8
2025	Sören Pellmann	LINKE	36.8

== Election results ==
=== 2025 election ===
Federal election (2025): Leipzig II
Notes:	Blue background denotes the winner of the electorate vote. Pink background denotes a candidate elected from their party list. Yellow background denotes an electorate win by a list member, or other incumbent. A ✓ or ✗ denotes status of any incumbent, win or lose respectively.						
Party	Candidate	Votes	%	±%	Party votes	%	±%
Left	✓ Sören Pellmann	71,809	36.8	▲14.0	46,692	23.9	▲9.2
AfD	Christoph Neumann	36,547	18.7	▲7.2	36,424	18.7	▲7.4
Greens	Paula Piechotta	19,954	10.2	▼8.2	31,717	16.2	▼5.0
CDU	Dietmar Link	31,272	16.0	▼0.4	30,752	15.8	▲2.7
SPD	Nadja Sthamer	16,610	8.5	▼8.1	21,930	11.2	▼9.7
BSW	Eric Recke	10,113	5.2	New	13,819	7.1	New
FDP	Peter Jess	3,987	2.0	▼5.4	6,129	3.1	▼6.6
Tierschutzpartei					1,989	1.0	▼0.9
Volt					1,847	0.9	▲0.5
FW	Matthias Binner	2,005	1.0	▼0.4	1,482	0.8	▼0.5
PARTEI	Josephine Jannack	2,059	1.1	▼1.4	1,465	0.8	▼1.1
BD	Alexej Trunow	394	0.2	New	337	0.2	New
Pirates					296	0.2	▼0.3
Humanists	Caspar Schneiders	407	0.2	▼0.1	255	0.1	▼0.1
MLPD					96	<0.1	▼0.1
Informal votes		823			750		
Total valid votes		195,157			195,230		
Turnout		195,980	84.2	▲6.0			
Left hold	Majority	35,262	18.1	▲13.7			

=== 2021 election ===
Federal election (2021): Leipzig II
Notes:	Blue background denotes the winner of the electorate vote. Pink background denotes a candidate elected from their party list. Yellow background denotes an electorate win by a list member, or other incumbent. A ✓ or ✗ denotes status of any incumbent, win or lose respectively.						
Party	Candidate	Votes	%	±%	Party votes	%	±%
Left	✓ Sören Pellmann	40,938	22.8	▼2.5	26,472	14.7	▼7.8
Greens	Paula Piechotta	32,995	18.4	▲8.4	38,264	21.3	▲10.8
SPD	Nadja Sthamer	29,731	16.6	▲2.9	37,634	20.9	▲7.9
CDU	Jessica Heller	29,538	16.5	▼8.2	23,561	13.1	▼8.8
AfD	Siegbert Droese	20,667	11.5	▼3.4	20,213	11.2	▼4.7
FDP	Peter Jess	13,271	7.4	▲1.6	17,439	9.7	▲1.1
Tierschutzpartei					3,489	1.9	▲0.5
PARTEI	Thomas Kumbernuß	4,374	2.4	▼0.6	3,307	1.8	▼0.6
dieBasis	Matti Rabold	2,786	1.6		2,564	1.4	
FW	André Soudah	2,591	1.4	▲0.3	2,188	1.2	▲0.5
Pirates	Thomas Köhler	923	0.5	▼0.2	881	0.5	▼0.1
Volt					717	0.4	
Team Todenhöfer					589	0.3	
Gesundheitsforschung					438	0.2	
ÖDP	Tobias Kretschmer	635	0.4		383	0.2	0.0
Humanists	Jonas Lehn	573	0.3		402	0.2	
V-Partei3					353	0.2	▼0.1
NPD					218	0.1	▼0.3
MLPD	Philipp Gäbel	273	0.2	▼0.1	197	0.1	0.0
Bündnis C					192	0.1	
DKP					177	0.1	
Independent	Ulrika Schöllner	164	0.1				
The III. Path					159	0.1	
Informal votes		1,421			1,043		
Total valid votes		179,459			179,837		
Turnout		180,880	78.2	▲1.3			
Left hold	Majority	7,943	4.4	▲3.7			

=== 2017 election ===
Federal election (2017): Leipzig II
Notes:	Blue background denotes the winner of the electorate vote. Pink background denotes a candidate elected from their party list. Yellow background denotes an electorate win by a list member, or other incumbent. A ✓ or ✗ denotes status of any incumbent, win or lose respectively.						
Party	Candidate	Votes	%	±%	Party votes	%	±%
Left	Sören Pellmann	43,948	25.3	▲0.5	39,058	22.5	▼0.1
CDU	✗ Thomas Feist	42,778	24.6	▼9.7	38,111	21.9	▼10.6
AfD	Siegbert Droese	25,968	15.0		27,774	16.0	▲10.9
SPD	Jens Katzek	23,787	13.7	▼9.7	22,725	13.1	▼5.8
Greens	Monika Lazar	17,273	9.9	▲0.9	18,154	10.4	▼0.8
FDP	Friedrich Vosberg	10,052	5.8	▲4.3	14,866	8.6	▲5.5
PARTEI	Mathias Haschke	5,191	3.0	▲1.4	4,203	2.4	
Tierschutzpartei					2,555	1.5	
FW	Karsten Kietz	2,034	1.2		1,302	0.7	0.0
BGE					1,175	0.7	
Pirates	Ute Elisabeth Gabelmann	1,325	0.8	▼1.8	967	0.6	▼3.3
DiB					884	0.5	
NPD					678	0.4	▼1.1
V-Partei³					499	0.2	
Independent	Frank Roeder	493	0.3				
ÖDP					376	0.2	
MLPD	Gudrun Kimmerle	407	0.2		258	0.1	0.0
BüSo	Karsten Werner	380	0.2	▼0.6	199	0.1	▼0.1
Informal votes		1,562			1,414		
Total valid votes		173,636			173,784		
Turnout		175,198	76.9	▲6.8			
Left gain from CDU	Majority	1,170	0.7				

=== 2013 election ===
Federal election (2013): Leipzig II
Notes:	Blue background denotes the winner of the electorate vote. Pink background denotes a candidate elected from their party list. Yellow background denotes an electorate win by a list member, or other incumbent. A ✓ or ✗ denotes status of any incumbent, win or lose respectively.						
Party	Candidate	Votes	%	±%	Party votes	%	±%
CDU	✓ Thomas Feist	52,077	34.3	▲5.5	49,553	32.6	▲6.4
Left	Mike Nagler	37,750	24.9	▼0.5	34,302	22.5	▼3.0
SPD	Wolfgang Tiefensee	35,515	23.4	▲0.4	28,778	18.9	▲0.6
Greens	Monika Lazar	13,732	9.0	▼3.1	17,075	11.2	▼3.5
AfD					7,702	5.1	
Pirates	Sebastian Czich	3,914	2.6		5,897	3.9	
NPD	Matthias Koch	3,096	2.0	▼0.1	2,207	1.5	▼0.7
PARTEI	Mathias Haschke	2,347	1.5				
FDP	Holger Krahmer	2,237	1.5	▼5.9	4,583	3.0	▼8.9
FW					1,137	0.7	
PRO					383	0.3	
BüSo	Karsten Werner	1,192	0.8	▼0.4	349	0.2	▼0.6
MLPD					221	0.1	▼0.1
Informal votes		2,075			1,748		
Total valid votes		151,860			152,187		
Turnout		153,935	70.0	▲2.1			
CDU hold	Majority	14,327	9.4	▲5.9			

=== 2009 election ===
Federal election (2009): Leipzig II
Notes:	Blue background denotes the winner of the electorate vote. Pink background denotes a candidate elected from their party list. Yellow background denotes an electorate win by a list member, or other incumbent. A ✓ or ✗ denotes status of any incumbent, win or lose respectively.						
Party	Candidate	Votes	%	±%	Party votes	%	±%
CDU	Thomas Feist	41,101	28.8	▲3.2	37,304	26.1	▲2.9
Left	Mike Nagler	36,117	25.3	▲2.8	36,431	25.5	▲3.0
SPD	Wolfgang Tiefensee	32,841	23.0	▼12.3	26,133	18.3	▼14.2
Greens	Monika Lazar	17,345	12.2	▲5.0	20,998	14.7	▲4.7
FDP	Cornelius Janßen	10,505	7.4	▲2.6	16,983	11.9	▲4.3
NPD	Holger Odenthal	3,094	2.2	▼0.2	3,119	2.2	0.0
BüSo	Karsten Werner	1,674	1.2	▲0.4	1,203	0.8	▲0.4
MLPD					376	0.3	▲0.1
REP					248	0.2	0.0
Informal votes		1,904			1,786		
Total valid votes		142,677			142,795		
Turnout		144,581	67.9	▼7.5			
CDU gain from SPD	Majority	4,984	3.5				

=== 2005 election ===
Federal election (2005):Leipzig II
Notes:	Blue background denotes the winner of the electorate vote. Pink background denotes a candidate elected from their party list. Yellow background denotes an electorate win by a list member, or other incumbent. A ✓ or ✗ denotes status of any incumbent, win or lose respectively.						
Party	Candidate	Votes	%	±%	Party votes	%	±%
SPD	✓ Gunter Weißgerber	53,181	35.3	▼4.6	49,115	32.5	▼8.0
CDU	Alexander Achminow	38,545	25.6	▲1.7	35,098	2.5	▲0.5
Left	Volker Külow	33,881	22.5	▼0.9	33,969	22.5	▲4.7
Greens	Monika Lazar	10,787	7.2	▲1.4	15,038	10.0	▲0.9
FDP	Georg Keßler	7,141	4.7	▼1.6	11,512	7.6	▲1.1
NPD	Helmut Herrmann	3,502	2.3		3,305	2.2	▲1.5
BüSo	Thomas Rottmair	1,135	0.8		724	0.5	▲0.3
Independent	Lothar Krägelin	1,110	0.7				
APPD	Kilian Springer	1,26	0.7				
Alliance for Health, Peace and Social Justice					942	0.6	
DSU	Karl-Heinz Obser	373	0.2	▼0.4			
SGP					365	0.2	
PBC					353	0.2	0.0
REP					283	0.2	▼0.2
MLPD					234	0.2	
Informal votes		2,205			1,948		
Total valid votes		150,681			150,938		
Turnout		152,886	75.4	▲0.7			
SPD hold	Majority	14,636	9.7				
