= Johann Friedrich Krause =

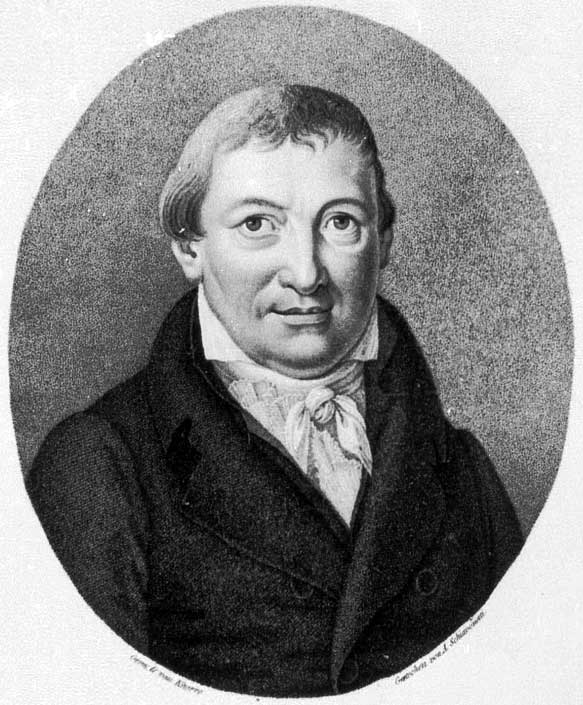
Johann Friedrich Krause

Johann Friedrich Krause (26 October 1770 in Reichenbach im Vogtland – 31 May 1820 in Weimar) was a German theologian.

He was the son of clergyman Christian Friedrich Krause (1740–1783); Johann's sister, Erdmuthe Dorothea Krause (1778–1856), was the grandmother of Friedrich Nietzsche. He studied theology at the University of Wittenberg, and later on, returned to his hometown of Reichenbach im Vogtland as a deacon (1793). In 1802 he became a preacher at the cathedral in Naumburg, then from 1810 to 1819, he served as a professor of theology at the University of Königsberg. Afterwards, he worked as a preacher in Weimar.

His writings on the Epistle to the Philippians, the First Epistle of Peter and Second Epistle to the Corinthians as well as some theological and philosophical discussions were collected and published under the title Opuscula Theologica (1818). His collection of sermons were issued with the title Predigten über die gewöhnlichen Sonn- und Festtags-Evangelien des ganzen Jahres.
