= Mylau Castle =

German castle

Mylau Castle Imperial Castle Mylau
- Burg Mylau
- Reichenbach im Vogtland, Saxony, Germany
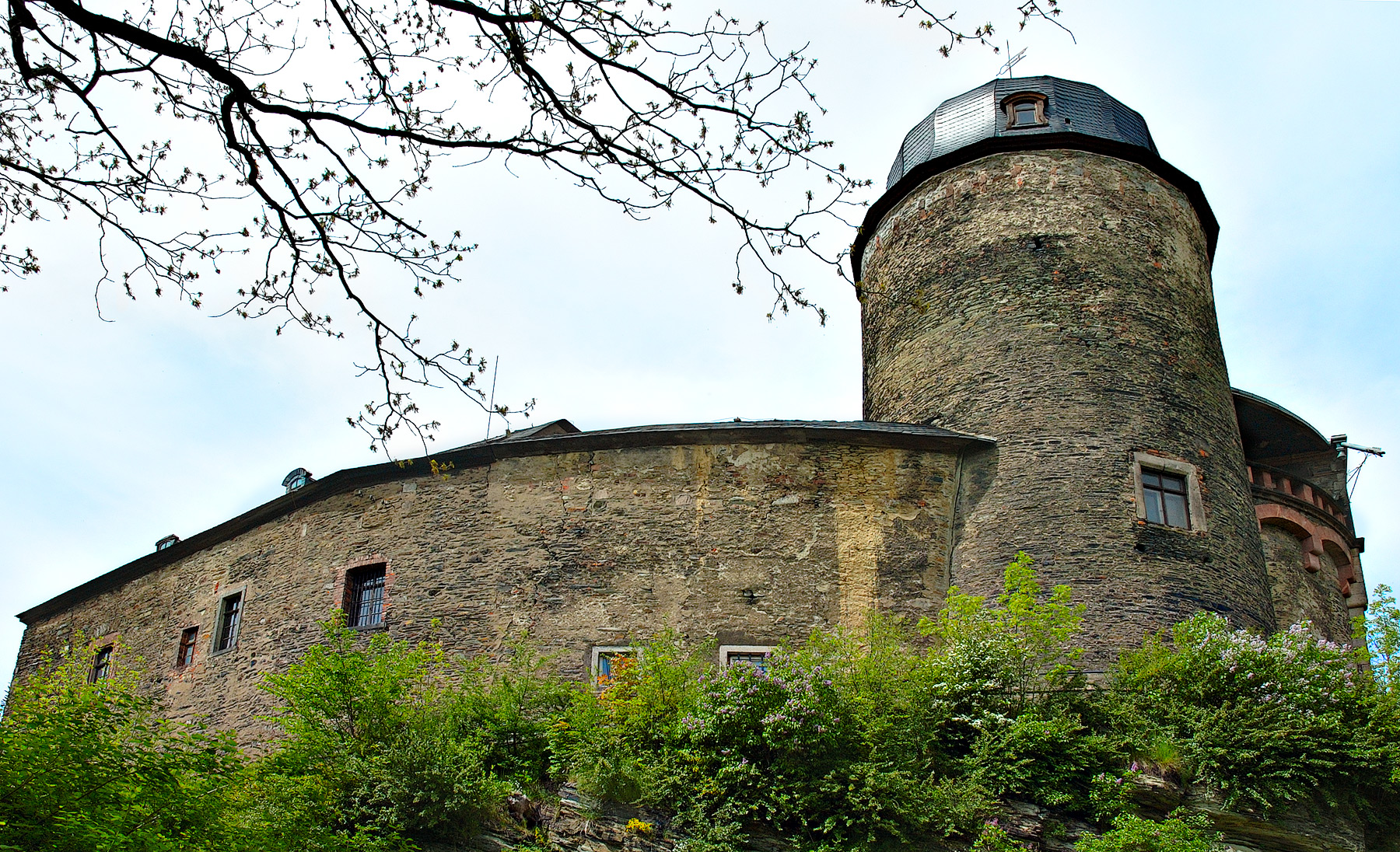
- Mylau Castle

Site information
- Type: Hill castle, Spornburg
- Code: DE-SN
- Condition: Mainly preserved

Location
- Coordinates: 50°37′06″N 12°15′56″E

Site history
- Built: circa 1180

Garrison information
- Occupants: Emperor, Fürst, Nobility

Mylau Castle (formerly also known as Imperial Castle Mylau) is a fortification on a spur in the Reichenbach im Vogtland district of Mylau, Vogtland, Saxony, Germany. It is one of the best-preserved medieval castles in Saxony.

== History ==
The castle was probably erected during the German eastward expansion under the regime of Emperor Barbarossa. It offered protection to the predominantly Frankish settlers in an area that was sparsely inhabited by Slavs. Under the protection of the castle, among others the trade city Reichenbach im Vogtland was founded. The 27 m (89 ft) tall Bergfried was built according to Romanesque style. The castle was built as hill castle with a single courtyard on a ridge of approximately 80 m (260 ft) long and 35 m (115 ft) wide, at the point where the Seifenbach flows into the Göltzsch river. Originally four defense towers and a 22 m (72 ft) deep dry boat surrounded the castle.

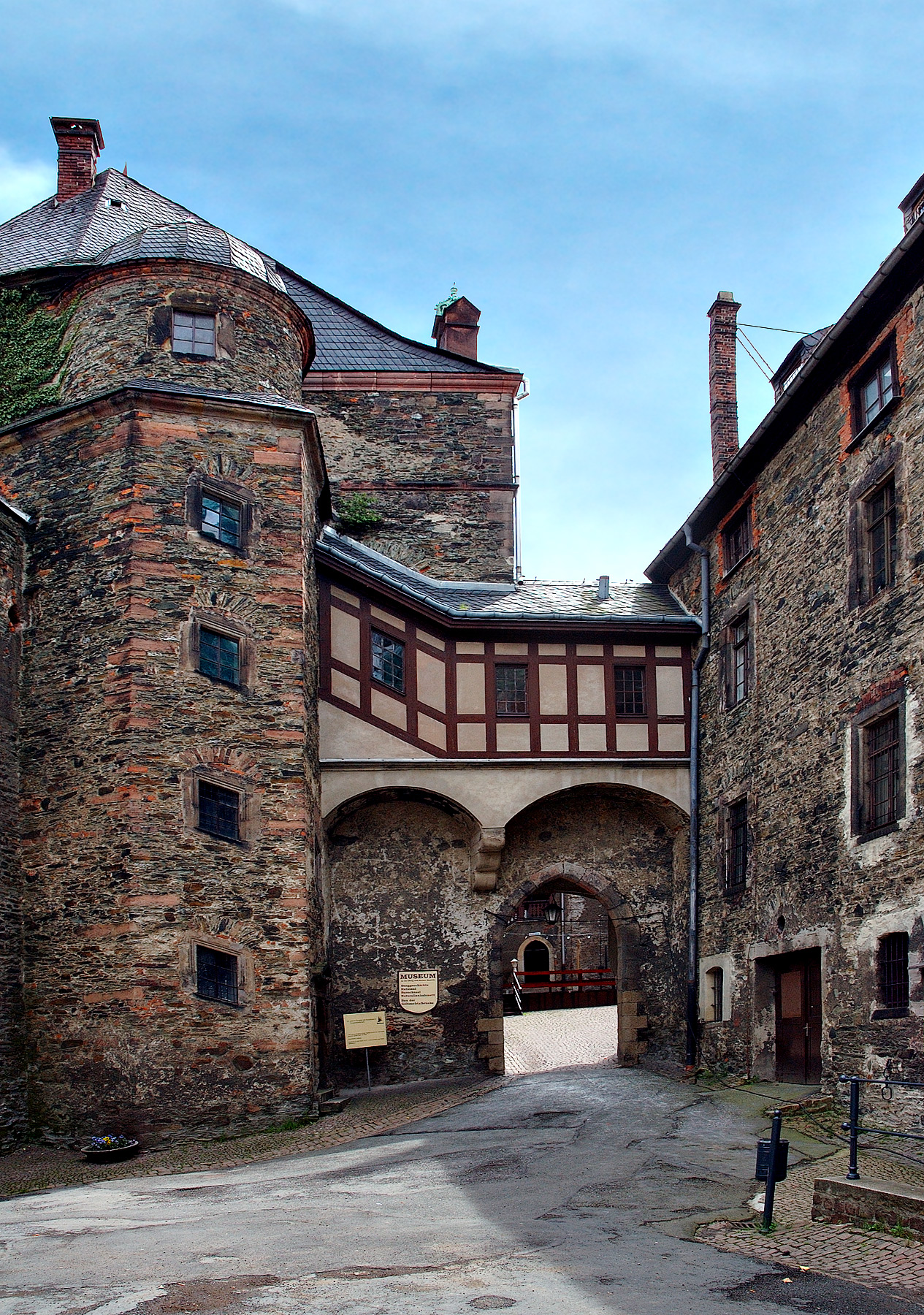
Inner courtyard

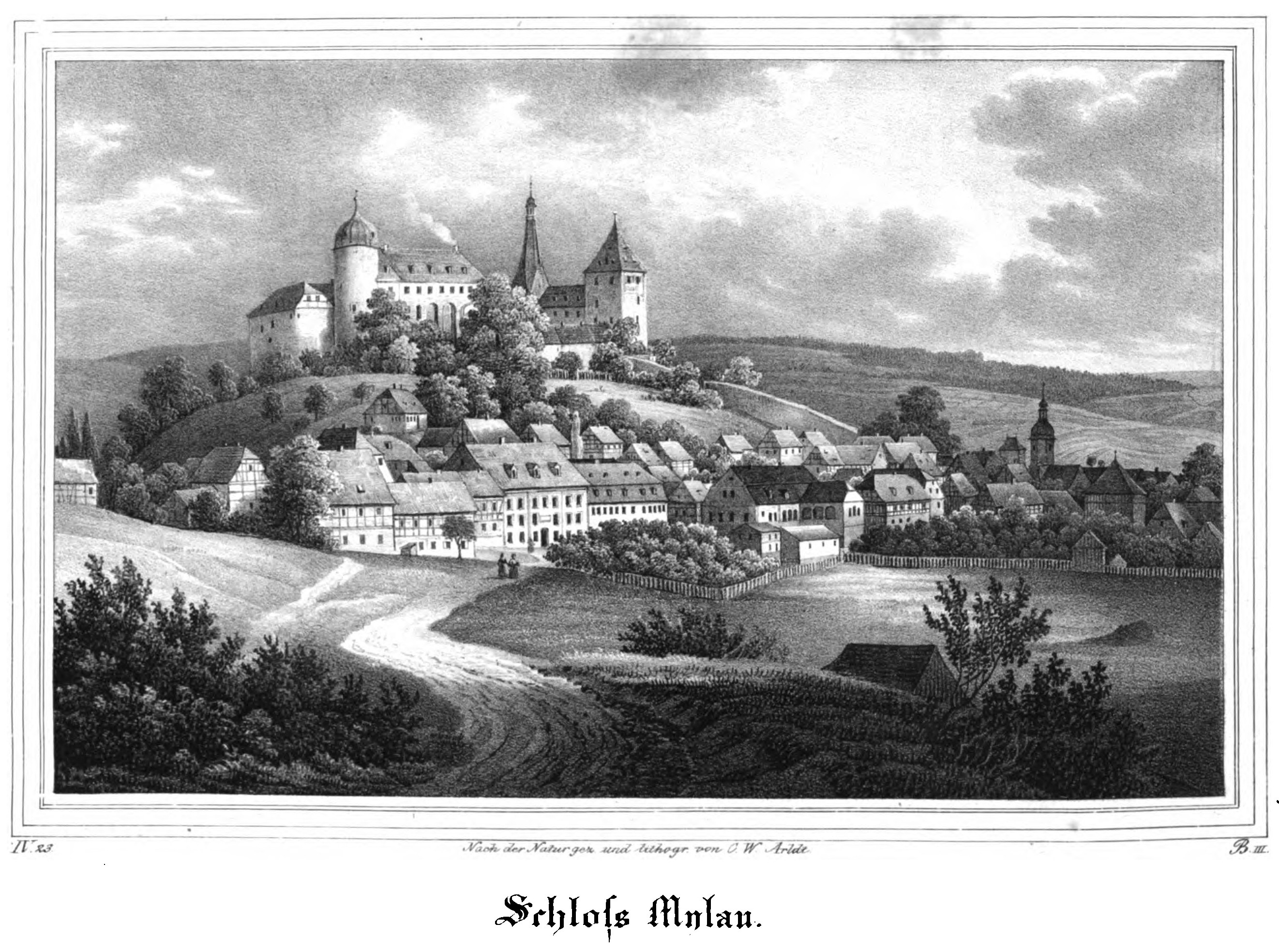
Mylau and its castle, 1839

The first record of the Lords of Milin who inhabited the castle dates from 1214. As a result of the War of Vogtland (1354–1357), emperor Charles IV ordered them in 1367 to sell the castle to the Bohemic crown. That same year, he visited the castle and granted town privileges to the adjacent town of Mylau. Charles IV, whose relief in porphyry can be seen above the main entrance gate, instated a royal Bohemian office and began the expansion of the structure, which was continued by his sons Wenceslaus IV and Sigismund. Part of the castle was destroyed in 1400 due to a feud between Wenceslaus IV and the Vögte of the Vogtland. During the renovations, two large outer baileys were erected.

In 1422, Sigismund pledged Mylau Castle to the prince-elector of Saxony in gratitude for his services during the Hussite Wars. The castle would remain in the hands of the Saxons, except between 1547 and 1569 when a burgrave was appointed over the Vogtland. One of the members of the rotating burgraves was Joseph Levin von Metzsch (1507–1571), a friend of Martin Luther. In the late 16th century, the aristocratic Thuringian-Saxon Von Schönberg family owned the castle. It was no longer used for defense purposes, but received a residential destination. In 1772, following a large reconstruction, it lost its aristocratic estate and has been privately held since.

Between 1808 and 1828 it housed the first factory in northern Vogtland of local spinning magnate Christian Gotthelf Brückner (1769–1834). The various owners of the castle had it expanded and renovated various times before it became municipal property in 1982. In the late 19th century, a foundation had the castle rebuilt in historic style to serve as city hall, tavern and museum.

== Attractions and current use ==
The many modifications in earlier and more recent history makes Mylau Castle a melting pot of styles. The museum that opened in 1883 contains the largest natural history collection in the Vogtland. It furthermore offers an expositions on the construction of the Göltzsch Viaduct and it provides information on the regional geology and mining. In 1899/1900, a room was dedicated to the aristocratic Metzsch family, who have long owned the castle. The most representative room of the castle is the council chamber, which was inspired by the Wartburg. From the castle's Market Gate, the Imperial Path leads up to the imperial court, along which 13 panels explain the castle's most remarkable features and describe the time under the emperors and Bohemian kings Charles IV, Wenceslaus IV and Sigismund.

Aside from the museum, the castle houses offices.
