= Göltzsch =

River in Germany

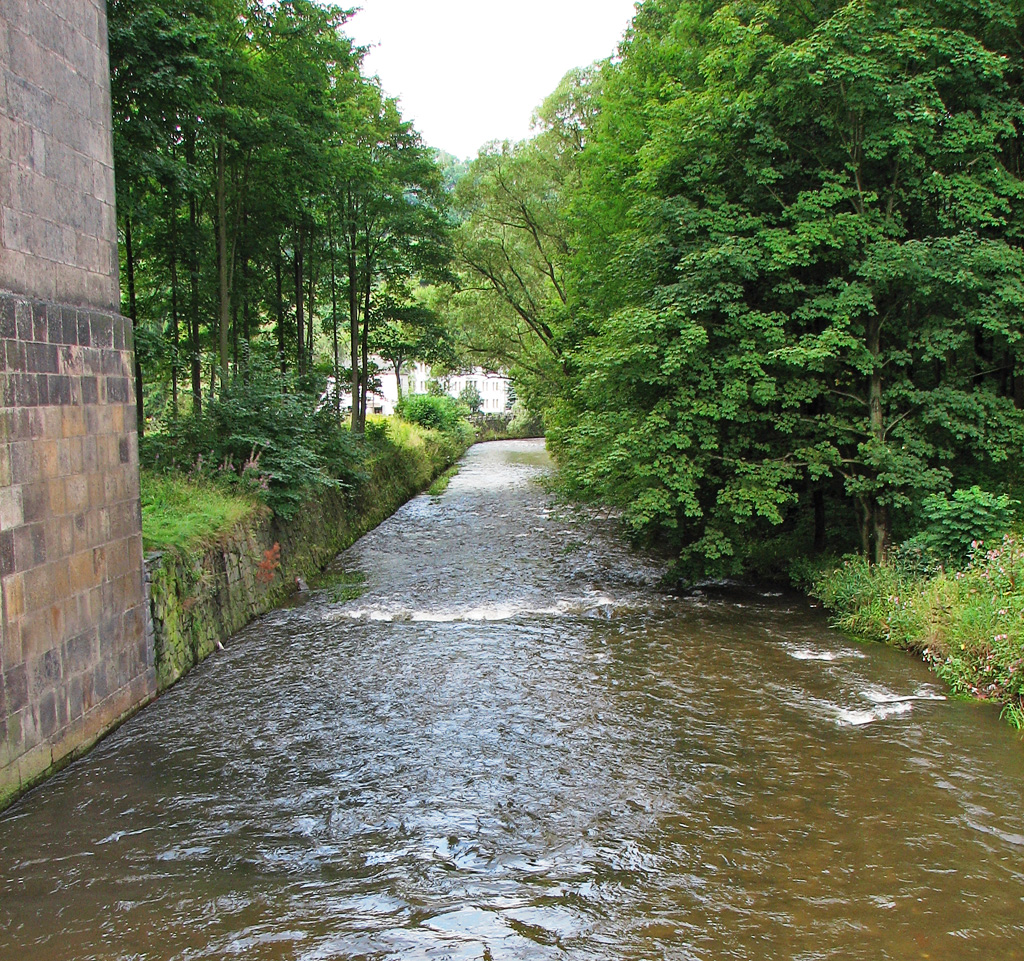

Location
- Country: Germany
- States: Saxony

Physical characteristics
- Mouth
  - location: White Elster
  - coordinates: 50.6429°N 12.1984°E

Basin features
- Progression: White Elster→ Saale→ Elbe→ North Sea

The Göltzsch (German pronunciation: [ˈɡœlt͡ʃ]) is a river of Saxony, Germany. It is a right tributary of the White Elster, which it joins near Greiz.

== See also ==
- List of rivers of Saxony
