= Vogtlandkreis (electoral district) =

Federal electoral district of Germany

165 Vogtlandkreis
- Electoral district for the Bundestag
- Vogtlandkreis in 2025
- State: Saxony
- Population: 226,000 (2019)
- Electorate: 184,973 (2021)
- Major settlements: Plauen; Reichenbach im Vogtland; Auerbach
- Area: 1,412.4 km^{2}

Current electoral district
- Created: 1990
- Party: AfD
- Member: Mathias Weiser
- Elected: 2025

Vogtlandkreis is an electoral constituency (German: Wahlkreis) represented in the Bundestag. It elects one member via first-past-the-post voting. Under the current constituency numbering system, it is designated as constituency 165. It is located in southwestern Saxony, comprising the Vogtlandkreis district.

Vogtlandkreis was created for the inaugural 1990 federal election after German reunification. From 2017 to 2025, it was represented by Yvonne Magwas of the Christian Democratic Union (CDU). Since 2025 it has been represented by Mathias Weiser of the AfD.

== Geography ==
Vogtlandkreis is located in southwestern Saxony. As of the 2021 federal election, it is coterminous with the Vogtlandkreis district.

== History ==
Vogtlandkreis was created after German reunification in 1990, then known as Reichenbach – Plauen – Auerbach – Oelsnitz. In the 2002 and 2005 elections, it was named Vogtland – Plauen. It acquired its current name in the 2009 election. In the 1990 through 1998 elections, it was constituency 328 in the numbering system. In the 2002 and 2005 elections, it was number 168. In the 2009 election, it was number 167. In the 2013 through 2021 elections, it was number 166. From the 2025 election, it has been number 165.

Originally, the constituency comprised the independent city of Plauen and the districts of Reichenbach, Landkreis Plauen, Auerbach, and Oelsnitz. In the 2002 and 2005 elections, it comprised the independent city of Plauen and the Vogtlandkreis district. It acquired its current borders in the 2009 election.

Election	No.	Name	Borders
1990	328	Reichenbach – Plauen – Auerbach – Oelsnitz	Reichenbach district; Plauen city; Landkreis Plauen district; Auerbach district; Oelsnitz district
1994	328	Reichenbach – Plauen – Auerbach – Oelsnitz	Reichenbach district; Plauen city; Landkreis Plauen district; Auerbach district; Oelsnitz district
1998	328	Reichenbach – Plauen – Auerbach – Oelsnitz	Reichenbach district; Plauen city; Landkreis Plauen district; Auerbach district; Oelsnitz district
2002	168	Vogtland – Plauen	Plauen city; Vogtlandkreis district
2005	168	Vogtland – Plauen	Plauen city; Vogtlandkreis district
2009	167	Vogtlandkreis	Vogtlandkreis district
2013	166	Vogtlandkreis	Vogtlandkreis district
2017	166	Vogtlandkreis	Vogtlandkreis district
2021	166	Vogtlandkreis	Vogtlandkreis district
2025	165	Vogtlandkreis	Vogtlandkreis district

== Members ==
The constituency was first represented by Bertram Wieczorek of the Christian Democratic Union (CDU) from 1990 to 1994, followed by Rudolf Braun until 1998. Rolf Schwanitz of the Social Democratic Party (SPD) won the constituency in 1998. Robert Hochbaum regained it for the CDU in 2002 and served until 2017. Yvonne Magwas of the CDU was elected in 2017 and re-elected in 2021.

Election	Member	Party	%
1990	Bertram Wieczorek	CDU	48.7
1994	Rudolf Braun	CDU	48.5
1998	Rolf Schwanitz	SPD	37.7
2002	Robert Hochbaum	CDU	35.0
2005	Robert Hochbaum	CDU	36.1
2009	Robert Hochbaum	CDU	40.9
2013	Robert Hochbaum	CDU	48.3
2017	Yvonne Magwas	CDU	35.0
2021	Yvonne Magwas	CDU	27.7
2025	Mathias Weiser	AfD	43.3

== Election results ==
=== 2025 election ===
Federal election (2025): Vogtlandkreis
Notes:	Blue background denotes the winner of the electorate vote. Pink background denotes a candidate elected from their party list. Yellow background denotes an electorate win by a list member, or other incumbent. A ✓ or ✗ denotes status of any incumbent, win or lose respectively.						
Party	Candidate	Votes	%	±%	Party votes	%	±%
AfD	Mathias Weiser	60,676	43.3	▲16.5	57,140	40.6	▲15.6
CDU	Robert Hochbaum	37,770	27.0	▼0.7	30,407	21.6	▲1.9
BSW					15,553	11.1	New
SPD	Maik Linke	13,974	10.0	▼9.5	12,383	8.8	▼13.6
Left	Simon Zwintzscher	13,335	9.5	▲0.2	10,937	7.8	▼1.1
FW	Harry Petzold	6,298	4.5	New	2,346	1.7	▲0.1
Greens	Olaf Horlbeck	4,524	3.2	▼1.5	4,436	3.2	▼1.4
FDP	Torsten Schnurre	3,412	2.4	▼6.0	4,092	2.9	▼7.2
Tierschutzpartei					1,770	1.3	▼1.1
PARTEI					679	0.5	▼0.7
Volt					352	0.3	▲0.1
BD					309	0.2	New
Pirates					162	0.1	▼0.1
Humanists					88	0.1	▼0.1
MLPD					64	<0.1	0.0
Informal votes		1,593			864		
Total valid votes		139,989			140,718		
Turnout		141,582	79.8	▲5.3			
AfD gain from CDU	Majority	22,906	16.3	N/A			

=== 2021 election ===
Federal election (2021): Vogtlandkreis
Notes:	Blue background denotes the winner of the electorate vote. Pink background denotes a candidate elected from their party list. Yellow background denotes an electorate win by a list member, or other incumbent. A ✓ or ✗ denotes status of any incumbent, win or lose respectively.						
Party	Candidate	Votes	%	±%	Party votes	%	±%
CDU	✓ Yvonne Magwas	37,637	27.7	▼7.3	26,782	19.7	▼10.6
AfD	Mathias Weiser	36,388	26.8	▲0.9	34,112	25.1	▼1.4
SPD	Kay Burmeister	26,413	19.5	▲8.4	30,436	22.4	▲11.0
Left	Johannes Höfer	12,655	9.3	▼6.2	12,058	8.9	▼7.2
FDP	André Ludwig	11,512	8.5	▲2.9	13,708	10.1	▲2.9
Greens	Olaf Horlbeck	6,378	4.7	▲0.9	6,263	4.6	▲1.6
Tierschutzpartei					3,181	2.3	▲0.9
FW					2,155	1.6	▲0.7
dieBasis	Mario Falcke	2,339	1.7		2,048	1.5	
PARTEI					1,676	1.2	▲0.2
Bündnis C					779	0.6	
Gesundheitsforschung					652	0.5	
ÖDP	Dietmar Eichhorn	970	0.7		364	0.3	0.0
LKR	David Drechsel	667	0.5				
The III. Path	Udo Sieghart	515	0.4		459	0.3	
Pirates					340	0.2	0.0
NPD					291	0.2	▼0.8
Independent	Claus Gerisch	277	0.2				
Team Todenhöfer					248	0.2	
Volt					191	0.1	
Humanists					157	0.1	
DKP					88	0.1	
V-Partei3					82	0.1	▼0.1
MLPD					73	0.1	0.0
Informal votes		2,065			1,673		
Total valid votes		135,751			136,143		
Turnout		137,816	74.5	▲0.6			
CDU hold	Majority	1,249	0.9	▼8.2			

=== 2017 election ===
Federal election (2017): Vogtlandkreis
Notes:	Blue background denotes the winner of the electorate vote. Pink background denotes a candidate elected from their party list. Yellow background denotes an electorate win by a list member, or other incumbent. A ✓ or ✗ denotes status of any incumbent, win or lose respectively.						
Party	Candidate	Votes	%	±%	Party votes	%	±%
CDU	Yvonne Magwas	49,104	35.0	▼13.3	42,604	30.2	▼14.0
AfD	Ulrich Lupart	36,428	26.0		37,217	26.4	▲19.8
Left	Maik Schwarz	21,809	15.5	▼4.1	22,578	16.0	▼4.2
SPD	Eric Holtschke	15,538	11.1	▼9.6	16,043	11.4	▼4.6
FDP	Uwe Geisler	7,836	5.6	▲3.0	10,154	7.2	▲4.4
Greens	Oliver Bittmann	5,292	3.8	▲1.2	4,266	3.0	▼0.3
Independent	Roberto Gottfried Rink	4,348	3.1				
Tierschutzpartei					2,046	1.5	
PARTEI					1,495	1.1	
NPD					1,437	1.0	▼2.1
FW					1,299	0.9	▼0.2
Pirates					415	0.3	▼1.6
BGE					355	0.3	
ÖDP					311	0.2	
DiB					255	0.2	
V-Partei³					163	0.1	
MLPD					144	0.1	0.0
BüSo					79	0.1	▼0.1
Informal votes		2,420			1,914		
Total valid votes		140,355			140,861		
Turnout		142,775	73.9	▲5.2			
CDU hold	Majority	12,676	9.0	▼18.6			

=== 2013 election ===
Federal election (2013): Vogtlandkreis
Notes:	Blue background denotes the winner of the electorate vote. Pink background denotes a candidate elected from their party list. Yellow background denotes an electorate win by a list member, or other incumbent. A ✓ or ✗ denotes status of any incumbent, win or lose respectively.						
Party	Candidate	Votes	%	±%	Party votes	%	±%
CDU	✓ Robert Hochbaum	65,743	48.3	▲7.4	60,466	44.2	▲7.6
SPD	Benjamin Zabel	28,172	20.7	▲4.8	21,885	16.0	▲1.0
Left	Janina Pfau	26,707	19.6	▼5.3	27,617	20.2	▼5.9
AfD					9,095	6.7	
NPD	Arne Schimmer	5,693	4.2	▲0.5	4,322	3.2	▼0.4
Greens	Agnes Russo	3,540	2.6	▼1.7	4,569	3.3	▼1.7
FDP	Martin Treeck	3,533	2.6	▼6.9	3,836	2.8	▼9.7
Pirates	Kai Grünler	2,746	2.0		2,603	1.9	
FW					1,537	1.1	
PRO					488	0.4	
BüSo					148	0.1	▼0.5
MLPD					129	0.1	▼0.1
Informal votes		2,656			2,095		
Total valid votes		136,134			136,695		
Turnout		138,790	68.7	▲4.5			
CDU hold	Majority	37,571	27.6	▲11.6			

=== 2009 election ===
Federal election (2009): Vogtlandkreis
Notes:	Blue background denotes the winner of the electorate vote. Pink background denotes a candidate elected from their party list. Yellow background denotes an electorate win by a list member, or other incumbent. A ✓ or ✗ denotes status of any incumbent, win or lose respectively.						
Party	Candidate	Votes	%	±%	Party votes	%	±%
CDU	✓ Robert Hochbaum	55,128	40.9	▲4.8	49,522	36.7	▲6.6
Left	Janina Pfau	33,586	24.9	▲2.6	35,235	26.1	▲3.1
SPD	Rolf Schwanitz	21,393	15.9	▼9.4	20,227	15.0	▼10.2
FDP	Joachim Günther	12,755	9.5	▲2.9	16,882	12.5	▲2.2
Greens	Thomas Pinkert	5,849	4.3	▲0.9	6,781	5.0	▲1.2
NPD	Hartmut Krien	4,908	3.6	▼1.1	4,772	3.5	▼1.1
PBC	Steve Körner	1,290	1.0	▼0.6			
BüSo					815	0.6	▲0.4
REP					569	0.4	▼0.2
MLPD					251	0.2	▲0.1
Informal votes		2,421			2,276		
Total valid votes		134,909			135,054		
Turnout		137,330	64.3	▼10.7			
CDU hold	Majority	21,542	16.0	▲5.1			

=== 2005 election ===
Federal election (2005):Vogtland - Plauen
Notes:	Blue background denotes the winner of the electorate vote. Pink background denotes a candidate elected from their party list. Yellow background denotes an electorate win by a list member, or other incumbent. A ✓ or ✗ denotes status of any incumbent, win or lose respectively.						
Party	Candidate	Votes	%	±%	Party votes	%	±%
CDU	✓ Robert Hochbaum	58,988	36.1	▲1.1	49,095	30.0	▼3.7
SPD	Rolf Schwanitz	41,200	25.2	▼9.0	41,100	25.1	▼10.6
Left	Wolfgang Hinz	36,462	22.3	▲4.2	37,593	23.0	▲8.4
FDP	Joachim Günther	10,685	6.5	▼1.7	16,788	10.3	▲2.6
NPD	Uwe Bagehorn	7,808	4.8		7,557	4.6	▲3.9
Greens	Volker Liskowsky	5,684	3.5	▲0.6	6,222	3.8	▲0.3
PBC	Anton Bukschat	2,578	1.6	0.0	2,101	1.3	▲0.2
Alliance for Health, Peace and Social Justice					1,099	0.7	
REP					982	0.6	▼1.0
SGP					365	0.2	
BüSo					349	0.2	▲0.1
MLPD					219	0.1	
Informal votes		2,898			2,833		
Total valid votes		163,405			163,470		
Turnout		166,303	75.0	▲1.7			
CDU hold	Majority	17,788	10.9				
