= Vogtland 3 =

State electoral district of Germany

3: Vogtland 3
- Electoral district for the Landtag of Saxony
- Vogtland 3 in 2024
- District: Vogtland
- Electorate: 58,471 (2024)
- Major settlements: Elsterberg, Lengenfeld, Netzschkau, Oelsnitz, Reichenbach im Vogtland, and Treuen

Current electoral district
- Party: AfD
- Member: René Standke

Vogtland 3 is an electoral constituency (German: Wahlkreis) represented in the Landtag of Saxony. It elects one member via first-past-the-post voting. Under the constituency numbering system, it is designated as constituency 3. It is within the district of Vogtlandkreis.

== Geography ==
The constituency includes the towns of Elsterberg, Lengenfeld, Netzschkau, Oelsnitz, Reichenbach im Vogtland, and Treuen, and the municipalities of Bergen, Bösenbrunn, Eichigt, Heinsdorfergrund, Limbach, Neumark, Neuensalz, Pöhl, Theuma, Tirpersdorf, Triebel, and Werda within Vogtlandkreis.

There were 58,471 eligible voters in 2024

== Members ==
Election	Member	Party	%
2014	Sören Voigt	CDU	45.3
2019	Sören Voigt	CDU	43.1
2024	René Standke	AfD	36.2

== Election results ==
=== 2024 election ===
State election (2024): Vogtland 3
Notes:	Blue background denotes the winner of the electorate vote. Pink background denotes a candidate elected from their party list. Yellow background denotes an electorate win by a list member, or other incumbent. A ✓ or ✗ denotes status of any incumbent, win or lose respectively.						
Party	Candidate	Votes	%	±%	Party votes	%	±%
AfD	René Standke	15,287	36.2	▲8.1	14,672	34.7	▲7.3
CDU	Marcus Fritsch	13,525	32.0	▼5.7	14,573	34.4	▼2.2
BSW	Janina Pfau	5,307	12.6		6,096	14.4	
FW	Stephan Hösl	3,184	7.5	▲3.2	850	2.0	▼0.8
SPD	Saskia Feustel	1,929	4.6	▼2.7	2,018	4.8	▼3.5
Left	Petra Rank	1,286	3.9	▼9.2	945	2.2	▼8.5
FDP	Luisa Strobel	651	1.5	▼3.0	293	0.7	▼3.0
Greens	Danny Przisambor	588	1.4	▼4.2	694	1.6	▼3.2
Freie Sachsen					685	1.6	
APT					470	1.1	
Values	Heiko Petzoldt	455	1.1		301	0.7	
PARTEI					248	0.6	▼0.6
Bündnis C					159	0.4	
BD					92	0.2	
dieBasis					78	0.2	
Pirates					55	0.1	
ÖDP					43	0.1	
BüSo					24	0.1	
V-Partei3					22	0.1	
Informal votes		455			349		
Total valid votes		42,212			42,318		
Turnout		42,667	73.0	▲10.4			
AfD gain from CDU	Majority	1,762	4.2				

=== 2019 election ===
State election (2019): Vogtland 1
Notes:	Blue background denotes the winner of the electorate vote. Pink background denotes a candidate elected from their party list. Yellow background denotes an electorate win by a list member, or other incumbent. A ✓ or ✗ denotes status of any incumbent, win or lose respectively.						
Party	Candidate	Votes	%	±%	Party votes	%	±%
CDU	✓ Sören Voigt	11,739	43.1	▼2.2	11,038	40.4	▼4.6
AfD		7,255	26.6	▲16.2	7,321	26.8	▲16.3
Left		2,695	9.9	▼9.2	2,645	9.7	▼8.7
SPD		1,852	6.8	▼6.6	2,097	7.7	▼4.7
FW		1,348	5.0		705	2.6	▲1.8
Greens		1,189	4.4	▲0.8	1,128	4.1	▲1.3
FDP		1,039	3.8	▲1.0	944	3.5	▲0.7
APT					454	1.7	▲0.7
PARTEI					301	1.1	▲0.8
NPD					140	0.5	▼3.9
Verjüngungsforschung					140	0.5	
DSU		110	0.4				
The Blue Party					102	0.4	
ÖDP					76	0.3	
Awakening of German Patriots - Central Germany					74	0.3	
Pirates					62	0.2	▼0.4
Humanists					45	0.2	
BüSo					17	0.1	Steady
PDV					16	0.1	
DKP					14	0.1	
Informal votes		362			270		
Total valid votes		27,227			27,319		
Turnout		27,589	61.7	▲17.7			
CDU hold	Majority	4,484	16.5	▼9.7			

=== 2014 election ===
State election (2014): Vogtland 3
Notes:	Blue background denotes the winner of the electorate vote. Pink background denotes a candidate elected from their party list. Yellow background denotes an electorate win by a list member, or other incumbent. A ✓ or ✗ denotes status of any incumbent, win or lose respectively.						
Party	Candidate	Votes	%	±%	Party votes	%	±%
CDU	Sören Voigt	9,334	45.3		9,319	45.0	
Left		3,925	19.1		3,809	18.4	
SPD		2,750	13.4		2,572	12.4	
AfD		2,150	10.4		2,164	10.5	
NPD		924	4.5		919	4.4	
Greens		741	3.6		580	2.8	
FDP		586	2.8		661	3.2	
APT					203	1.0	
FW					158	0.8	
Pirates		175	0.9		129	0.6	
DSU					81	0.4	
PARTEI					66	0.3	
Pro Germany Citizens' Movement					36	0.2	
BüSo					11	0.1	
Informal votes		375			252		
Total valid votes		20,585			20,708		
Turnout		20,960	44.0	▼15.4			
CDU win new seat	Majority	5,409	26.2				

== See also ==
- Politics of Saxony
- Landtag of Saxony
