= Vogtland 2 =

State electoral district of Germany

2: Vogtland 2
- Electoral district for the Landtag of Saxony
- Vogtland 2 in 2024
- District: Vogtland
- Electorate: 59.051 (2024)
- Major settlements: Adorf, Auerbach, Bad Elster, Falkenstein, Klingenthal, Markneukirchen, Rodewisch and Schöneck

Current electoral district
- Created: 2014
- Party: CDU
- Member: Sören Voigt

Vogtland 2 is an electoral constituency (German: Wahlkreis) represented in the Landtag of Saxony. It elects one member via first-past-the-post voting. Under the constituency numbering system, it is designated as constituency 2. It is within the district of Vogtlandkreis.

== Geography ==
The constituency includes the towns of Adorf, Auerbach, Bad Elster, Falkenstein, Klingenthal, Markneukirchen, Rodewisch and Schöneck, and the municipalities of Bad Brambach, Ellefeld, Grünbach, Mühlental, Muldenhammer, Neustadt, and Stenberg within Vogtlandkreis.

There were 59,051 eligible voters in 2024

== Members ==
Election	Member	Party	%
2014	Andreas Heinz	CDU	40.3
2019	Andreas Heinz	CDU	38.2
2024	Sören Voigt	CDU	41.1

== Election results ==
=== 2024 election ===
State election (2024): Vogtland 2
Notes:	Blue background denotes the winner of the electorate vote. Pink background denotes a candidate elected from their party list. Yellow background denotes an electorate win by a list member, or other incumbent. A ✓ or ✗ denotes status of any incumbent, win or lose respectively.						
Party	Candidate	Votes	%	±%	Party votes	%	±%
CDU	Sören Voigt	17,247	41.1	▼0.9	15,571	37.0	▼3.0
AfD	Janet Hartenstein	14,437	34.4	▲6.7	13,716	32.6	▲5.6
BSW	Anja Kunze	5,328	12.7		5,977	14.2	
SPD	Tim Müller	1,401	3.3	▼3.7	2,047	4.9	▼3.0
Freie Sachsen					858	2.0	
FW	Georg Grajewski	1,118	2.7	▼0.8	566	1.3	▼1.7
Left	Antje Feiks	937	2.2	▼8.1	752	1.8	▼7.3
Greens	Olaf Horlbeck	700	1.7	▼3.3	637	1.5	▼2.9
APT					429	1.0	
Bündnis C					366	0.9	
Values	Thomas Strobel	447	1.1		333	0.8	
PARTEI					272	0.6	▼0.3
FDP	Torsten Schnurre	355	0.8	▼3.6	262	0.6	▼2.8
BD					87	0.2	
dieBasis					65	0.2	
Pirates					50	0.1	
V-Partei3					33	0.1	
ÖDP					22	0.1	
BüSo					11	0.0	
Informal votes		412			328		
Total valid votes		41,970			42,054		
Turnout		42,382	71.8	▲9.5			
CDU hold	Majority	2,810	6.7				

=== 2019 election ===
State election (2019): Vogtland 2
Notes:	Blue background denotes the winner of the electorate vote. Pink background denotes a candidate elected from their party list. Yellow background denotes an electorate win by a list member, or other incumbent. A ✓ or ✗ denotes status of any incumbent, win or lose respectively.						
Party	Candidate	Votes	%	±%	Party votes	%	±%
CDU	✓ Andreas Heinz	11,351	38.2	▼2.1	11,159	37.3	▼4.4
AfD		9,116	30.7	▲19.5	8,475	28.3	▲16.7
Left		3,709	12.5	▼5.0	2,743	9.2	▼7.8
SPD		2,222	7.5	▼7.3	2,347	7.8	▼5.3
Greens		1,695	5.7	▲2.6	1,522	5.1	▲2.0
FDP		1,624	5.5	▲1.6	1,141	3.8	▲0.2
FW					1,087	3.6	▲1.5
APT					475	1.6	▲0.6
PARTEI					276	0.9	▲0.6
Verjüngungsforschung					175	0.6	
NPD					174	0.6	▼4.5
The Blue Party					92	0.3	
ÖDP					67	0.2	
Pirates					54	0.2	▼0.6
Awakening of German Patriots - Central Germany					41	0.1	
PDV					35	0.1	
Humanists					34	0.1	
DKP					31	0.1	
BüSo					17	0.1	Steady
Informal votes		599			371		
Total valid votes		29,717			29,945		
Turnout		30,316	64.2	▲17.6			
CDU hold	Majority	2,235	7.5	▼15.3			

=== 2014 election ===
State election (2014): Vogtland 2
Notes:	Blue background denotes the winner of the electorate vote. Pink background denotes a candidate elected from their party list. Yellow background denotes an electorate win by a list member, or other incumbent. A ✓ or ✗ denotes status of any incumbent, win or lose respectively.						
Party	Candidate	Votes	%	±%	Party votes	%	±%
CDU	Andreas Heinz	9,215	40.3		9,551	41.7	
Left		4,002	17.5		3,905	17.0	
SPD		3,384	14.8		3,003	13.1	
AfD		2,559	11.2		2,662	11.6	
NPD		1,036	4.5		1,174	5.1	
FDP		897	3.9		831	3.6	
FW		877	3.8		487	2.1	
Greens		709	3.1		722	3.1	
APT					240	1.0	
Pirates		178	0.8		131	0.6	
DSU					97	0.4	
PARTEI					80	0.3	
Pro Germany Citizens' Movement					28	0.1	
BüSo					19	0.1	
Informal votes		406			333		
Total valid votes		22,857			22,930		
Turnout		23,263	46.6	▼11.8			
CDU win new seat	Majority	5,213	22.8				

== See also ==
- Politics of Saxony
- Landtag of Saxony
