= Rudolf Braun =

Rudolf Braun may refer to:

- Rudolf Braun (composer)
- Rudolf Braun (historian)
- Rudolf Braun (politician)
- Rudolf Braun (Luftwaffe)
