= Yvonne Magwas =

German politician

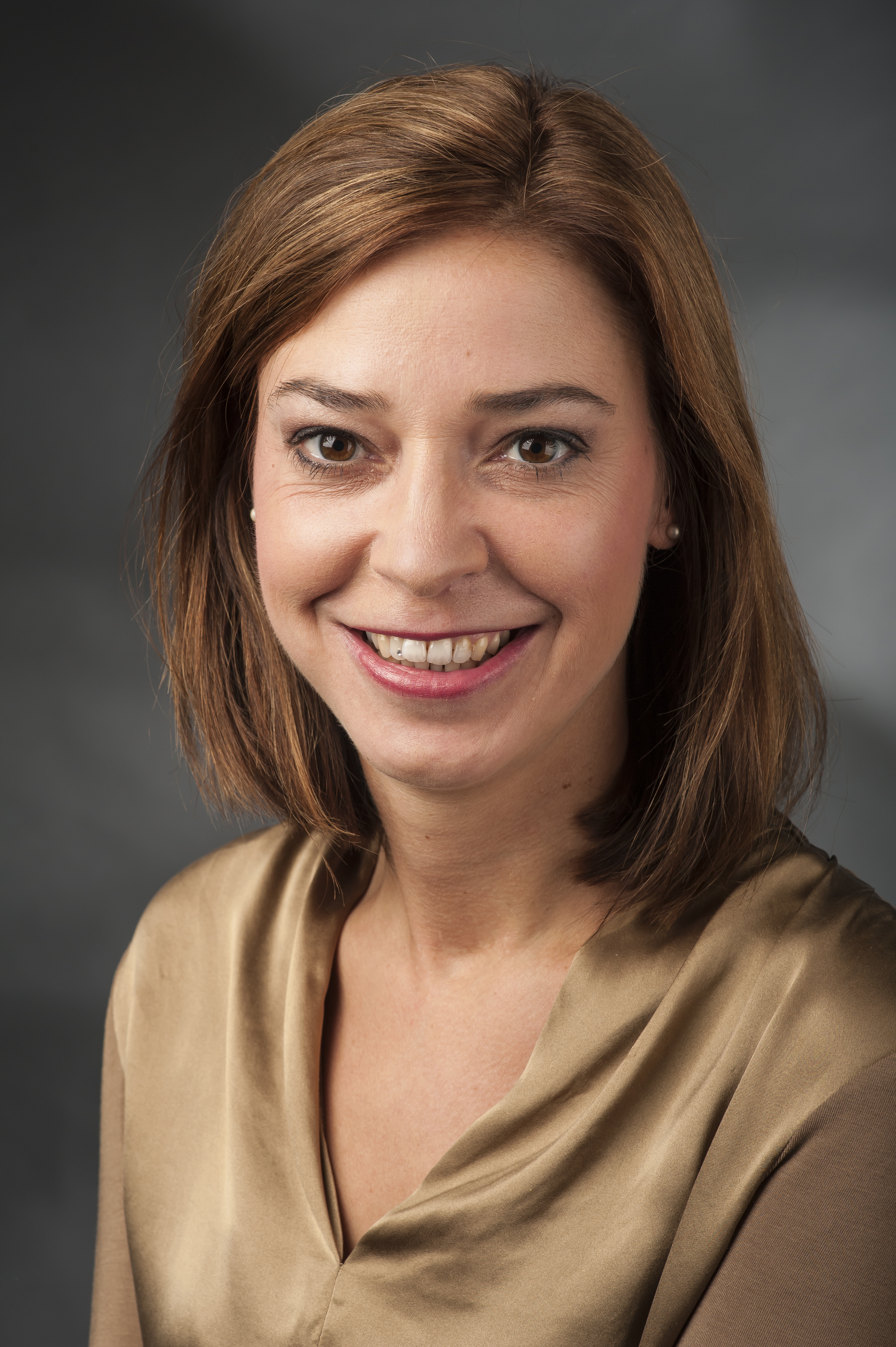

Vice President of the Bundestag (on proposal of the CDU/CSU group)
- In office 26 October 2021 – 25 March 2025
- Preceded by: Hans-Peter Friedrich
- Succeeded by: Andrea Lindholz

Member of the Bundestag for Saxony
- In office 22 October 2013 – 23 February 2025

Personal details
- Born: 28 November 1979 (age 46) Rodewisch, East Germany (now Germany)
- Citizenship: German
- Party: CDU

Yvonne Magwas (born 28 November 1979) is a German politician of the Christian Democratic Union (CDU). A member of the German Bundestag since 2013, she served as its Vice President from 2021 to 2025.

== Education and early career ==
Yvonne Magwas grew up in the Vogtland towns of Falkenstein and Auerbach, where she took her A-Levels at the Goethe-Gymnasium Auerbach in 1998. From 1999 to 2006, she studied sociology, psychology, and business administration at the Chemnitz University of Technology, where she graduated with a Diploma in Sociology.

Still during her studies, Magwas started up a company matching applicants with relevant internships as well as carrying out investigations in the field of human resources and organizational development. In addition, she acted as the chief of staff to the member of the German Bundestag Robert Hochbaum between 2005 and 2013.

== Political career ==
Magwas joined the Junge Union (Young Union), the youth organization of the Christian Democratic Union of Germany (CDU) and became a member of the CDU in 2001. She served as district chairwoman of the Junge Union Vogtland (2001–2006) and member of the board of the Junge Union in Saxony (2003–2008). As of 2008, she has been the deputy district chair of the CDU Vogtland.

In 2003, Magwas was elected Councillor in Auerbach and district councillor in the Vogtland district, and exercised these function until 2009 and 2005, respectively.

In the 2013 federal elections, Magwas was elected a member of the German Bundestag, where she became a member of the Committee on the Environment, Nature Conservation, Building and Nuclear Safety and the Committee on Culture and Media and acted as the former committee's rapporteur on rental policy, housing and urban development. As of 2018, she has been serving on the Committee on Education, Research and Technology Assessment.

Amid the COVID-19 pandemic in Germany, Magwas co-chaired—alongside Silvia Breher, Tobias Hans, Hendrik Hoppenstedt and Paul Ziemiak—the CDU's first ever digital national convention in 2021.

In July 2024, Magwas announced that she would not stand in the 2025 federal elections but instead resign from active politics by the end of the parliamentary term.

== Other activities ==
- Foundation for the Humboldt Forum in the Berlin Palace, Alternate Member of the Council (since 2018)
- German Federal Film Board (FFA), Member of the Supervisory Board (since 2018)
- Deutschlandradio, Member of the Broadcasting Council (since 2014)

== Political positions ==
Ahead of the Christian Democrats' leadership election in 2018, Magwas publicly endorsed Annegret Kramp-Karrenbauer to succeed Angela Merkel as the party's chair. In 2019, she joined 14 members of her parliamentary group who, in an open letter, called for the party to rally around Merkel and Kramp-Karrenbauer amid criticism voiced by conservatives Friedrich Merz and Roland Koch.

In 2020, Magwas was one of the driving forces behind plans to introduce a mandatory quota aimed at achieving equal representation of women within the CDU's regional and national governing bodies by 2025.

When Friedrich Merz argued in 2023 that the Christian Democrats may look to work together with the far right Alternative for Germany at the municipal level, Magmas sought to distance herself from that suggestion, arguing on Twitter: "Whether district council or (national) parliament, right-wing radicals remain right-wing radicals. For Christian Democrats, right-wing radicals are ALWAYS the enemy!"

== Personal life ==
As of 2018, Magwas has been in a relationship with Marco Wanderwitz, with whom she had a child in 2019.
