= Mathias Weiser =

German politician (born 1986)

Member of the Bundestag
- Incumbent
- Assumed office March 2025
- Preceded by: Yvonne Magwas
- Constituency: Vogtlandkreis

Personal details
- Born: Schleiz
- Party: Alternative for Germany (since 2019)

Mathias Weiser is a German politician who was elected as a member of the Bundestag in 2025. He has been a member of the Alternative for Germany since 2019.
