= Siegbert Hummel =

German Tibetologist (1908–2001)

Siegbert Hummel (18 July 1908 – 28 March 2001) was a German Tibetologist and cultural historian. His work focused on the Eurasian context of Tibetan culture, the Bön religion, the Zhangzhung language, and the Gesar epic.

== Biography ==
Born in Rodewisch, Hummel obtained his Abitur from König-Albert-Gymnasium in Leipzig in 1932. He studied theology, philosophy, psychology and history of art at the universities of Tübingen, Rostock, Leipzig and Munich between 1932 and 1938.

From 1938 to 1947, Hummel worked in Leipzig and Dresden as a minister in the Lutheran church. During this time, he also studied Chinese, Japanese, Tibetan and Mongolian languages as well as ethnology and Egyptology. He became curator of the Asian department at the Ethnographic Museum of Leipzig in 1947, a job he held until 1955. In 1948, Hummel obtained his doctorate in Sinology from at the University of Leipzig.

After leaving the museum in 1955, Hummel worked as a pastor in the country parish of Plohn in Vogtland until his retirement.

He died in Röthenbach (Rodewisch) near Rodewisch.

== Works of Siegbert Hummel ==
- 1948
  - Weltbild des Buddhismus (eine Ausstellung), Leipzig, 1948, pp. 23–24.
  - "Der Lotusstabträger," Archiv für Ostasien 1.1: 11-13.
- 1949
  - Ostasiatische Keramik (Ausstellung 14/4-31/5 1949, Museum für Völkerkunde), Leipzig 1949, pp. 4.
- 1950
  - "Guan-yin in der Unterwelt," Sinologica 2, 4: 291-293.
  - "Die Bedeutung der ostasiatischen Keramik fur unsere Gegenwart," Forschungen und Fortschritte 26, 9-10: 115-117.
  - "Die Gloriolen in der lamaistischen Malerei," Asiatische Studien 4: 90-107.
  - "Der Medizinbuddha und seine Begleiter" Sinol 2, 2: 81-104.
  - "Der Pfauenbuddha," Sinol 2, 2: 234-241.
- 1951
  - "Erlauterungen zum KundalinI-Yoga," Psyche 1951, 3: 210-218.
  - "Das Paradoxe in der Theorie des KundalinI-Yoga," Psyche 1951, 6: 399-400.
  - "Zur Frage der Aufstellung buddhistischer Bildwerke Zentral- und Ostasiens," JMVL 10: 50-58.
  - "Die Lamapagode als psychologisches Diagramm," Psyche 1951, 10: 628-631.
- 1952
  - "VOID Wesen der chinesischen Tuschmalerei aus der Sung-Zeit," JMLV 11: 12-22.
  - "Taranatha und der Schwarze-ManjusrI," ZMR 36, 1: 67-71.
  - "Zur Karte von Sikhim und Bhutan," Erd 6,4: 1-3.
  - "Der lamaistische Ritualdolch (phur-bu) und die altvorderorientalischen Nagelmenschen," Asiatische Studien 6: 41-51.
  - "Ueber die Rechtschreibung der Ortlichkeiten auf Tibetkarten," Petermanns Geographische Mitteilungen 96, 1: 3638.
  - "Eine lamaistische Seidenstickerei im Museum für Völkerkunde Leipzig," JMVL 10: 59-61.
- 1953
  - "Die lamaistischen Tempelfahnen und ihre Beziehung zum Yoga," Trib 2-3: 239-253.
  - "Bildwerke lamaistischer Gottheiten als Abwehrzauber" Sinologica 3, 4: 242-254.
  - "Der lamaistische Donnerkeil (rDo-rje) und die Doppelaxt der Mittelmeerkultur" Anthr 48: 982-987.
  - "Eine lamaistische Seidenstickerei" IW 5, 5: 79-81.
  - "Psychologische Grundlagen der tibetischen Kulturgeschichte" Ethnos 18, 1-2: 31-44.
  - "Beitrage zu einer Baugeschichte der Lamapagode", Artibus Asiae 16: 111-118.
- 1954
  - "Magische Hande und Fusse" Artibus Asiae 17: 149-154.
  - "Nichtanimistisches und Animistisches im Lamaismus" JMVL 12: 52-62.
  - "Ikonographische Notizen zum Lamaismus" JMVL 12: 63-81.
- 1955
  - "Der Hund des Daitschin-Tengri/' Geogr Helv 10, 3: 145-147.
  - "Grundzuge einer Urgeschichte der tibetischen Kultur" JMVL 13: 73-134.
  - "Der Lamaismus und die Ikonenmalerei des morgenlandischen Christentums" JMVL 13: 135-145.
- 1956
  - "Sechs Pekinger Bronzen auf einem Bilde von E. Schlieper," Sinol5, 1: 36-40.
  - "Wer waren die Erbauer der tibetischen Burgen?" Paideuma 6, 4: 205-209.
- 1957
  - "Schleuder und Tierbalgboot in Tibet," BSGAE 33: 42-48.
  - "Ethnologische Grundlagen der tibetischen Kulturgeschichte," ZE 82, 2: 243-249.
  - "Die heilige Höhle in Tibet" Anthr 52: 623-631.
  - "Heilige Berge in Tibet" Anthr 52: 944-949.
  - "Aufgaben und Bedeutung der Tibetologie," Z psycho-somat Med 3, 3: 211-220.
  - "Eine Jenseitsdarstellung aus' Tibet," AEH 6, 1-2: 233-242.
  - "Die tibetische Frühgeschichte und die Etruskerfrage," Paideuma 6, 6: 307-317.
  - "Strafen und Torturen der Tibeter," Geogr Helv 12, 2: 93'-102.
- 1958
  - "Ueber die Herkunft der Irrigationstechnik in Tibet" BSGAE 34: 1-9.
  - "Die Gesichtsbemalung der Tibeter," ZE 83, 1: 281-284. .
  - "Das tibetische Kungserspiel" AEH 7, 1-2: 219-221.
  - "Die sudlich.en Salomo-Inseln und die Dongson-Kultur (Eine Randbemerkung)** ZE 83, 1: 66-68.
  - "Shaktistisches im Lamaismus der Tibeter" Sinologica 5, 4: 226-243.
  - "Zum Ursprung der Totengerichts- und Hollenvorstellungen bei den Tibetem" ZMR 42, 1, 1958: 48-55.
  - "Anmerkungen zur Apokalypse des Lamaismus" Ar 0 26, 2: 186-196.
  - "Der Ursprung des·tibetischen Mandalas," Ethnos 1958, 2: 158-171.
  - "Der Hund in der religiösen Vorstellungswelt des Tibeters," Paideuma 6, 8: 500-509.
  - "Strafen und Torturen der Tibeter," Geogr Helv 13, 1: 67-68.
- 1959
  - "Frau Welt und der Priesterk6nig Johannes," ZMR 43, 2: 103-117.
  - "Eurasiatische Traditionen in der tibetischen Bon-Religion," Opusc. Ethn. Mem. Lud. Bir6 Sacra, Budapest 1959, pp. 165–212.
  - "Die Gottheiten der Schulter in Tibet (Phrag-Iha)," RSOr 34: 183-197.
  - "Die lamaistische Psychologie und ihre SteHung zum Spiritismus," Z psychosomat Med 5, 3: 207-216.
  - "Einige parapsychologische Phanomene im Lamaismus der Tibeter," Z psychoS01nat Med 6, 1: 44-54.
  - "Anmerkungen zur Ge-sar-Sage," Anth.r 54: 517-535.
  - "Die lamaistischen Miniaturen im Linden-Museum," Trib 8: 15-37.
- 1960
  - "Die Frauenreiche in Tibet," ZE 85, 1: 44-46.
  - "Die Bedeutung der Na-khi fur die Erforschung der tibetischen Kultur," Monumenta Serica 19: 307-334.
  - "Der Weisse Alte," Sinologica 6, 3: 193-206.
  - "Der göttliche Schmied in Tibet," FS 19: 251-272.
  - "Der Bauplatz der Kathedrale von Lhasa und seine kosmologische Bedeutung," ](air 2, 4: 240-244.
  - "Der magische Stein in Tibet,". IAE 49, 2: 224-240.
- 1961
  - "Der Tigerbändiger in der tibetischen Ikonographie," FS 20: 1-13.
  - "Die Leichenbestattung in Tibet," Monumenta Serica 20: 266-281.
  - "Der Hund in der religiosen Vorstellungswelt des Tibeters," Paideuma 7, 7: 352-361
  - "Boy Dances at the New Year's Festival in Lhasa/' EaW 12, 1: 40-44.
- 1962
  - "Boy Dances at the New Year's Festival in Lhasa," EaW 13, 1: 24-26. **"Pe-har," EaW 13, 4: 313-316.
  - "Die Herrin der Berge," Ethnos 27, 1-4: 23-34.
  - "Die lamaistischen Kultplastiken im Linden-Museum," Trib. 11: 15-68.
  - "Das kristallene Meer in der Kathedrale von Lhasa," OE 9, 1: 90-96.
- 1963
  - "Zur Diskussion über das Ge-sar-Epos," Anthr 58: 231-233.
  - "Probleme der Lha-mo," CAl 8, 2: 143-148.
  - "Günstige und ungünstige Zeiten und Zeichen nach dem Tibetischen des Chags-med-rin-po-che" AFS 22: 89-132.
  - "Mi-Ia-ras-pa un die bKa'-rgyud-pa-Schule," Kair 5, 4: 300-307.
  - "Games of the Tibetans," (together with Paul G. Brewster), FFC o1.77, 2 (No.187), Helsinki 1963, 33 pp.
  - "Ein Parivara des Gautama Buddha," Asiatische Studien 17, 1-2: 41-46.
  - "Ars Tibetana (Drei Bildbetrachtungen)," Ant 4, 1: 80-112.
- 1964
  - "Boy Dances at the New Year's Festival in Lhasa," EaW IS, 1-2: 50-52.
  - "Tibetische Architektur," BSGAE 40: 62-95.
  - "Die verschlossene Urflut im Stadtstempel zu Lhasa und die Weiden vor clem Heiligtum" Kalr 6, 3-4: 173-180.
  - "Zwei indo-tibetische Institute und ihre Veroffentlichungen," Kair 6,3-4: 267-269.
  - "Kosmische Strukturplane der Tibeter," Geogr HeIv 19, 1: 34-41.
  - "Die tibetischen Ma-ni-Mauern als megalithisches Erbe," IAE 50,1: 116-118.
  - "Das Motiv der Nabelschnur in Tibet," Ant 4, 6: 572-580.
  - "Profane und religiose Gegenstande aus Tibet und der lamaistischen Umwelt im Linden-Museum," Trib. 13: 31-138.
- 1965
  - "sMan-gyi bla," BT 2, 2: 9-15.
  - "Die Kathedrale von Lhasa. Imago mundi undHeilsburg" Ant 7, 3: 280-290.
  - "Die Steinreihen des tibetischen Megalithikums und die Ge-sar-Sage," Anthr 60: 833-838.
  - "Zentralasien und die Etruskerfrage" Kair 7, 4: 284-295.
  - "Lotusstab und Lotusstabtrager in der Ikonographie des Lamaismus." Asiatische Studien 1965: 167-174.
- 1967
  - "Non-animistic Elements in Tibetan Buddhism," BT 4, 1: 21-31.
  - "Khum-bu-yul-lha, der weisse Gott der Sherpa," Acta orientalia Academiae Scientiarum Hungaricae 20, 3: 353-361.
  - "Die lamaistischen Malereien und Bilddrucke im Linden-Museum," Trib 16: 35-195.
- 1968
  - "Ekajata in Tibet," Asiatische Studien 22: 110-114.
  - "Eine Bon-po-Foundation," Kair 10, 4: 288-289.
  - "The Tibetan Ceremony of Breaking the Stone," H ReI 8, 2: 139-142.
- 1969
  - "Bon-Ikonographisches in Linden-Museum," Anthr 63-64: 858-868.
  - "Die Maske in Tibet," Ant 11, 2: 181-191.
  - "Tuschmalerei der Sung-Zeit und buddhistische Ikonographie," Ant 11, 6: 546-555.
  - "The sMe-ba-dgu, the Magic Square of the Tibetans," EaW 19, 1-2: 139-146.
  - "Die Jakobinermutze im Parivara des Yama," Asiatische Studien 23, 1-2: 41-44.
  - "Einführung in Bergmanns Nomadische Streifereien," Bergmanns Nomadische Streifereien unter den Kalmücken in den Jahren 1802 und 1803, Riga 1804–1805, repro Oosterhout 1969, pp. v-viii.
- 1970
  - "Taranatha und sein Werk." Asiatische Studien 24, 1-2: 25-33.
- 1971
  - "Die Fuss-Spur des Gautama-Buddha auf dem Wu-T'ai-Shan." Asiatische Studien 25: 389-406.
  - "Zervanistische Traditionen in der Ikonographie des Lamaismus" Etudes tibetaines dediees il la m.e7noire de Marcelle Lalou, Paris 1971, pp. 159–165.
  - "The Motif of the Crystal Mountain in the Tibetan Gesar Epic," H ReI 10, 3: 204-210.
- 1972
  - "mGar" EZZ 1972: 215-222.
  - "Anmerkungen zu den Vorgeburtsreihen in Tibet," Wege zur Ganzheit. Festschrift Govinda, Almora, 1973, pp. 79–85.
  - "Einige Bemerkungen zu 'Jerusalem auf einer alten tibetischen Weltkarte," CACKlB 1973, 1: 47-48.
  - "VajrakIla," WZUH 22, 3: 21-27.
  - "Der Wunderbare Hirsch im Ge-sar-Epos," EZZ 1973: 37-40.
- 1974
  - "Der Osiris-Mythos in Tibet I," CAl 18, 1: 23-29.
  - "Transmigrations- und Inkarnationsreihen in Tibet unter besonderer Beriicksichtigung der Bon-Religion," AO 36: 181-189.
  - "Noch einmal Vajra1d:la," WZUH 23, 5: 126-127.
  - "Zentralasien und die Etruskerfrage. Anmerkungen," RSOr 48: 251-257.
  - "A Gnostic Miscellanea," EaW 24, 3-4: 343-361.
  - "Boy Dances at the New Year's Festival in the Region of Dri-c'u-rori., North Nepal," EaW 24, 3-4: 363-364.
  - "The Three Sisters in the Ge-sar Epic," BT ~ 1, 2: 5-12.
- 1975
  - "Der Osiris-Mythos in Tibet II," Central Asiatic Journal 19, 3: 199-201.
  - "Das tibetische Megalithikum," EZZ 1975: 31-54.
  - "Tut-ench-Amun auf dem Leoparden," Asiatische Studien 23-24: 65-67.
  - "Materialien zu einem Woerterbuch der Zhang-zhung-Sprache, I, II," Monumenta Serica 31: 488-520.
  - "Das heilige Land der Bon-po und das mythologische K'un-Iun der

Chinesen," CACKlB 1975, 3-4: 28-29. .

  - "La couleur dans l'iconographie tibetaine," Art lamarque, Bruxelles 1975, pp. vii-xi (also English and Dutch versions).
  - "Tibetische Heilkunde," LASTH 1975: 15-19.
- 1976
  - "Peter Simon Pallas 'Sammlungen historischer Nachrichten über die

mongolischen Völkerschaften' in einer Ausgabe durch Johann Heinrich Merck," Zentralasiatische Studien ·10: 545-550.

  - "Polyphem im Ge-sar.·Epos/, EZZ 1976: 81-83.
  - "Die drei Schwestern im Ge-sar-Epos," CACKIB 1976, 3-4: 24-30.
  - "Materialien zu einem Wörterbuch der Zhang-Zhung-Sprache III," Monumenta Serica 32: 320-336.
  - "Die Tibet-Sammlung des Linden-Museums," Trib 25: 83-125.
- 1977
  - "Agyptische Miszellen," AIm 8: 87-95.
- 1978
  - "Das Regenschatzmadchen Uh6d6ji/' AO 39: 213-216.
- 1979
  - "Die Bedeutung der Na-khi-Ikonographie fur ein Bon-Pantheon," Zentralasiatische Studien 13: 431-441.
  - "Agyptisch-tibetische Parallelen," AIm 9-10: 313-332.
- 1980
  - "Einführung," reprint of P.S. Pallas, Sammiungen historischen Nachrichten Uber die mongolischen Völkerschaften (1776), Graz (Akademische Druck- und Verlagsanstalt): iii-vii.
  - "Goethes ägyptische Sammlung," Goe ]b 97: 212-223.
  - "Notizen zu einem etruskischen Stamnos in Altenburg," Klio 62: 331-335.
  - "Die Flüsse und Seen auf den Tibetkarten des Ch'in TingTa Ch'ing Hui Tien T'u," Monumenta Serica 34: 513-524.
- 1982
  - "Etruskisches in Weimar," jOAiW, 53: 19-30.
  - "Goethes etruskische Sammlung," Goe ]b 99: -275-281.
  - "Eine Form der Todesstrafe in China und Tibet. .ling-chih," Ur aU]b NF 2: 242244.
- 1983
  - "Agyptische Miszellen," Ahn 11-12: 84-117.
  - "Die etruskische Sammlung im Museum des Kunsthandwerkes in Leipzig,"

Arch Anz: 1-4.

  - "Die etruskischen Kastenumen in Altenburg," ]OAiW 54: 47-52.
  - "Etruskisches im Schlossmuseum Gotha," ]OAiW 54: 53-57.
  - "Okin Taenggri bei P.S. Pallas, Sammlungen... ," Ur aU ]b NF 3: 179-181.
  - "Vignette zum agyptischen Totenbuch, Kap.ll0," Asiatische Studien 31-32: 43-45.
  - "Materialien zu einem Woerterbuch der Zhang-Zhung-Sprache,1I Monumenta Serica 35: 305-308.
- 1984
  - "Drei etruskischen Schmuckscheiben im Museum fiir Deutsche Geschichte,"

jOAiW, 55: 19-20.

  - "Etruskische Miszellen. Puer Senex," ]OAiW 55: 21-25.
  - "Italiotische Tongefasse in Goethes Sammlungen," Goe jb 101: 321-323.
  - "Chinesische und sino-tibetische Farbgebung im Lichte von Goethes Farbenlehre," Goe jb 101: 324-328.
  - "Notiz zur Vorgeschichte des Khatvanga," AD 45: 51-54.
- 1985
  - "Unentzifferte Petroglyphen der Mongolei," Monumenta Serica 36: 545-550.
  - "Die Flüsse und Seen auf Tibetkarten, II," Monumenta Serica 36: 551-553.
  - "Agyptisch-tibetische Parallelen, II," AIm 15-16: 23-44.
- 1986
  - "Notizen zu Min," AcOr 47: 7-12.
  - "Erinnerungenan Velletri. Italienische Reise-22. Februar 1787," Goe]b 103: 384-386.
  - "Der Ursprung der Sprache von Zhang-Zhung," JTS 6: 3-16.
- 1987
  - "Etruskische Miszellen II. Etruskische Kastenume im Albertinum-Dresden," jOAiW 57: 1-12.
  - "Der Dickbauchbuddha," AD 48: 157-167.
  - "Notizen zur Ikonographie der Marici," Monumenta Serica 37: 221-232.

1988

  - "Einige Notizen zum uralaltaischen Substrat im Altkanarischen und im

Etruskischen als Beitrag zur linguistischen Neolith-Anthropologie Eurasiosaharaniens," Gegenb morph jb 134, 1: 53-57.

  - "Seltene ikonographische Bildwerke aus Japan im Museum für Völkerkunde Leipzig," JMVL 37: 5-12.
  - "Sind die altkanarischen Petroglyphen deutbar?," Anthr 83: 561-:-562.
  - "Der Idafe auf der Insel La Palma," AIm 18-19: 48-56.
  - "Goethe und die Chinoiserie," Goe jb 105: 366-369.
- 1989
  - "Etruskische Miszellen III. Turnus," jOAiW 58: 25-39.
  - "Tragergestalten in der griechischen Ikonographie," jOAiW 58: 50-54.
  - "Die filofonnen Bronzestatuetten der Etrusker," jOAiW 58: 174-175.
  - "Die Schrift der Na-Khi," Zentralasiatische Studien 21: 7-19.
  - "Tao und Nu-Kua," Asiatische Studien 43, 1: 28-33.
  - "Einige linguistische Bemerkungen zum anthropologischen MongolenProblem," Gegenb morph jb 135, 5: 717-722.
- 1990
  - "gShen," Ur aU jb NF 9: 236-238.
  - "Idafe-Numen oder Menhir?," Alrn 20: 179-180.
  - "Einfuhrung," reprint of E. Schlagintweit, Die Lebensbeschreibung von Padmasambhava, (1899/1903), Ulm (Fabri) 1990: ii-iii (not numbered).
  - "Einige seltene Darstellungen in der etruskischen Ikonographie," jOAiW 59: 30-39.
  - "Manichaisches in der tibetischen Bon-Religion," MSN: 21-32.
- 1991
  - "Beziehungen des Sumerisch.en zu einigen Sprachen im protoaltaischen

Substrat," Anthr 86: 174-184.

  - "Kaihlsa und Manasarovar in den Vorstellungen der Na-Khi," Zentralasiatische Studien 22: 7-17.
- 1992
  - "Etruskische Miszellen IV. Die Aschekisten in der Tomba Campana (Veji), lDAiW 61: 27-32.
  - Die meroitische Sprache und dcis protoaltaische Sprachsubstrat als Mediunt zu ihrer Deutung, VIm (Fabri). Pp.87.
  - "Die Nagas in der Ikonographie der Na-Khi," Monumenta Serica 40: 235-243.
- 1993
  - "Mythologisches aus Eurasien im Ge-sar Heldenepos der Tibeter, VIm (Fabri). Pp.168.
  - "Meroitisch-türkische Aquivalente," Anthr 88: 190-194.
  - "Noch einmal die Schrift der Na-Khi," Zentralasiatische Studien 23: 13-17.
  - "Die Haube der meroitischen Konige," JOAiW 62: 1-4.
  - "gShen" (English version), BT (1992) 3: 5-8. '
- 1994
  - "Meroitische Miszellen," Anthr., 89, 1-3: 207-212.
  - "Wilhelm Radlof£'zum 75. Todestag. Wiirdigung seines Opus Magnum," Zentralasiatische Studien 24: 26-35.
  - "Khri und legs in den mythologischen Konigslisten der Tibeter, Ur. aU lb. NF 12: 240-244.
  - "Die Lieder der unglucklichen Konigin Sad-mar-kar, AO 55: 161-17~.
  - "Das Rad der Geburten und der Vater des Lichts im Jacobusbrief des Neuen Testamentes," Acta Orien.talia Belgica 8: 219-224.
- 1995.
  - Die meroitische Sprache II, VIm (Fabri).
  - "Neues Material zur Sprache von Zhang-Zhung," AO 56: 162-168.
- 1996
  - Die meroitische Sprache III, VIm (Fabri).
  - "Die meroitische Gottheit Apedemak und die Bedeutung ihres Namens,"Anthr. 91: 534-537.
  - "Funf seltene tibetische Kultgefasse im Linden-Museum Stuttgart. Ein Beitrag zur Bon-Religion," Monumenta Serica 44: 383-391.
- 1997
  - Die meroitische Sprache IV, DIm (Fabri).
