= Sören Voigt =

German politician (born 1971)

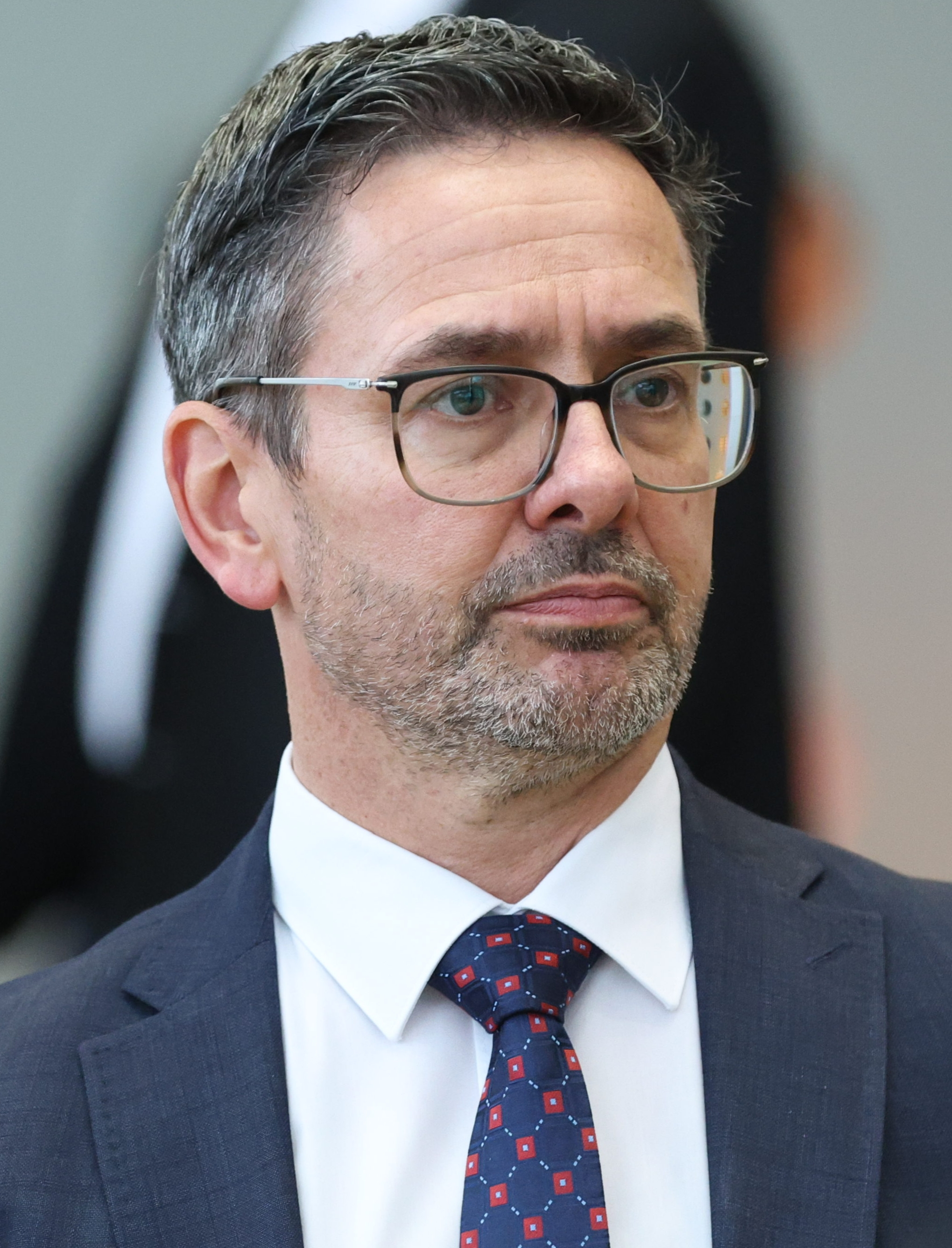
- Voigt in 2024

Member of the Landtag of Saxony
- Incumbent
- Assumed office 29 September 2014
- Preceded by: Jürgen Petzold
- Constituency: Vogtland 3 (2014–2024); Vogtland 2 (2024–present)

Personal details
- Born: 5 August 1971 (age 54) Rodewisch
- Party: Christian Democratic Union (since 1989)

Sören Voigt (born 5 August 1971 in Rodewisch) is a German politician serving as a member of the Landtag of Saxony since 2014. He has served as chairman of the Christian Democratic Union in the Vogtlandkreis since 2008.
