= Treuen =

- Town
- Coat of arms

- Location of Treuen within Vogtlandkreis district
- Interactive map of Treuen
- Location within Germany Location within Saxony
- Coordinates: 50°32′33″N 12°18′8″E
- Country: Germany
- State: Saxony
- District: Vogtlandkreis
- Subdivisions: 12

Government
  - Mayor (2022–29): Andrea Jedzig

Area
  - Total: 43.74 km^{2} (16.89 sq mi)
- Elevation: 424 m (1,391 ft)

Population (2025-12-31)
  - Total: 7,512
  - Density: 171.7/km^{2} (444.8/sq mi)
- Time zone: UTC+01:00 (CET)
  - Summer (DST): UTC+02:00 (CEST)
- Postal codes: 08233
- Dialling codes: 037468
- Vehicle registration: V, AE, OVL, PL, RC
- Website: www.treuen.de

Treuen (German pronunciation: [ˈtʁɔʏən]) is a town in the Vogtlandkreis district, in Saxony, Germany. It is situated 13 km east of Plauen, and 7 km northwest of Auerbach (Vogtland).
