= Rodewisch =

- Town
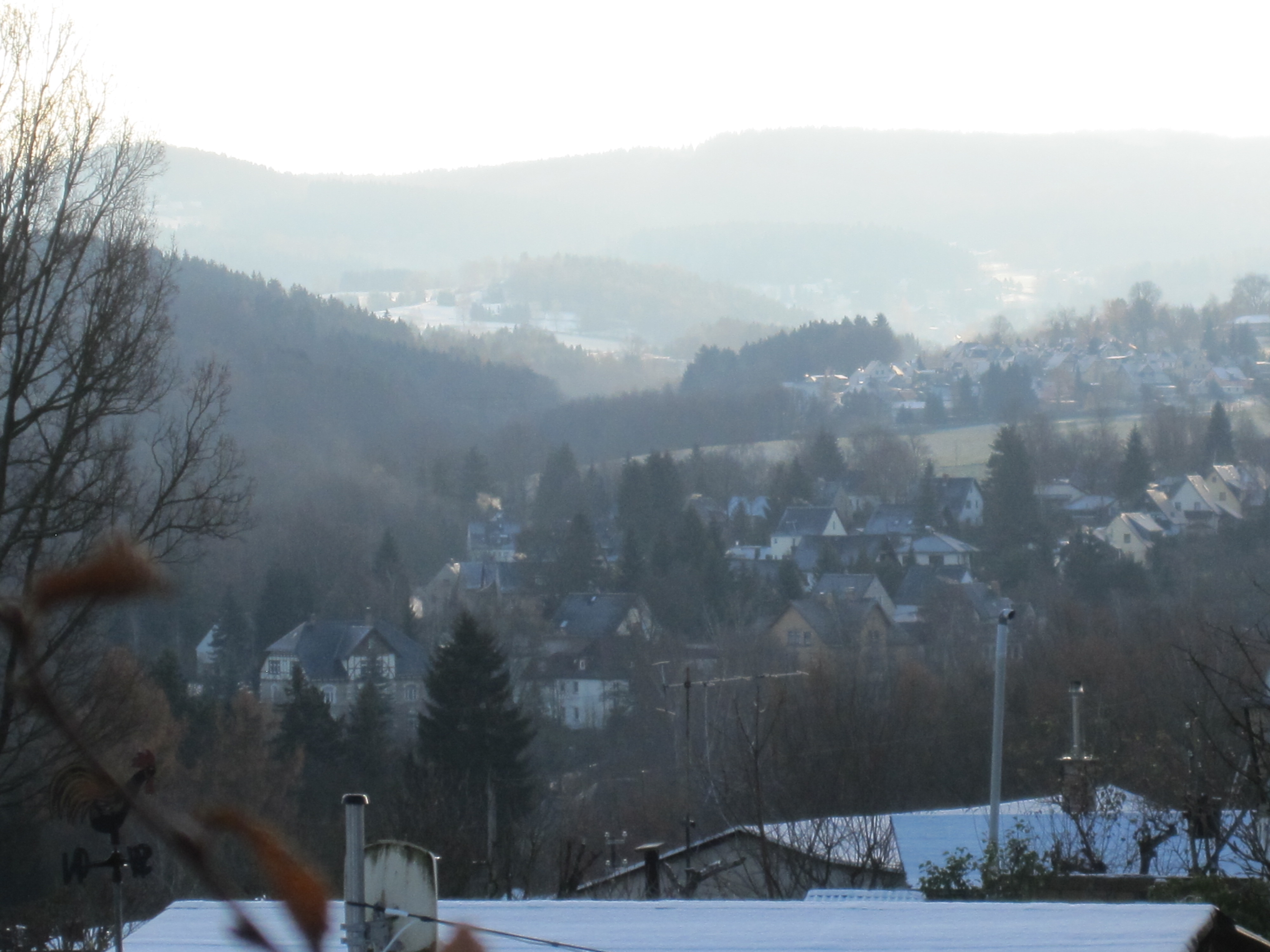
- Rodewisch seen from the train station

- Coat of arms

- Location of Rodewisch within Vogtlandkreis district
- Interactive map of Rodewisch
- Location within Germany Location within Saxony
- Coordinates: 50°31′52″N 12°24′20″E
- Country: Germany
- State: Saxony
- District: Vogtlandkreis

Government
  - Mayor (2019–26): Kerstin Schöniger (CDU)

Area
  - Total: 26.88 km^{2} (10.38 sq mi)
- Elevation: 427 m (1,401 ft)

Population (2025-12-31)
  - Total: 6,014
  - Density: 223.7/km^{2} (579.5/sq mi)
- Time zone: UTC+01:00 (CET)
  - Summer (DST): UTC+02:00 (CEST)
- Postal codes: 08228
- Dialling codes: 03744
- Vehicle registration: V, AE, OVL, PL, RC
- Website: www.rodewisch.de

Rodewisch (German pronunciation: [ˈʁoːdəvɪʃ]) is a town in the Vogtlandkreis district in Saxony, Germany. It is situated 3 km north of Auerbach (Vogtland), and 20 km east of Plauen. Sputnik 1 was seen for the first time in the world in Rodewisch. The town was first mentioned in 1411 and has been a town since 1924. Today's Rodewisch was formed in 1859 by the merger of the three districts of Obergöltzsch, Untergöltzsch and Niederauerbach. Rodewisch has two hospitals and a planetarium. Until 1926, there was a large brass works in the town, which was the largest in northern Germany. Röthenbach and Rützengrün have belonged to Rodewisch since 1994 and 1992 respectively.

== Demographics ==
Historical population:

- 1834: 2,643
- 1871: 3,455
- 1910: 9,494
- 1939: 11,237
- 1960: 12,828
- 1971: 10,196
- 1981: 9,513
- 1998: 8,241
- 1999: 8,105
- 2000: 7,904
- 2001: 7,793
- 2002: 7,762
- 2003: 7,670
- 2004: 7,654
- 2005: 7,562
- 2007: 7,366
- 2008: 7,235
- 2011: 6,769
- 2012: 6,714
- 2013: 6,650

== Notable people born in Rodewisch ==
- Falko Götz (born 1962), football player and manager
- Siegbert Hummel (1908–2001), Tibetologist and cultural historian
- Gerd Schädlich (1952–2022), football player and manager
- Sören Voigt (born 1971), German politician
- Yvonne Magwas (born 1979), German politician
