= Vogtland 1 =

State electoral district of Germany

1: Vogtland 1
- Electoral district for the Landtag of Saxony
- Vogtland 1 in 2024
- District: Vogtland
- Electorate: 61,178 (2024)
- Major settlements: Plauen and Pausa-Mühltroff

Current electoral district
- Created: 2014
- Party: CDU
- Member: Jörg Schmidt

Vogtland 1 is an electoral constituency (German: Wahlkreis) represented in the Landtag of Saxony. It elects one member via first-past-the-post voting. Under the constituency numbering system, it is designated as constituency 1. It is within the district of Vogtlandkreis.

== Geography ==
The constituency includes the cities of Plauen and Pausa-Mühltroff and the municipalities of Rosenbach and Weischlitz within Vogtlandkreis.

There were 61,178 eligible voters in 2024.

== History ==
Since the introduction of the sixty constituency system in 1994:

Election	No.	Name	Borders	Electorate
1994	2	Plauen	City of Plauen	55,426
1999	2	Plauen	City of Plauen, excluding the now incorporated district of Großfriesen	53,769
2004	1	Plauen	City of Plauen	58,093
2009	1	Plauen	City of Plauen	56,248
2014	1	Vogtland 1	City of Plauen	53,832
2019	1	Vogtland 1	City of Plauen	51,987
2024	1	Vogtland 1	City of Plauen; Town of Pausa-Mühltroff; Districts of Rosenbach and Weischlitz within Vogtlandkreis	61,178

== Members ==
Election	Member	Party	%
2014	Frank Heidan	CDU	33.1
2019	Frank Schaufel	AfD	30.0
2024	Jörg Schmidt	CDU	38.4

== Election results ==
=== 2024 election ===
State election (2024): Vogtland 1
Notes:	Blue background denotes the winner of the electorate vote. Pink background denotes a candidate elected from their party list. Yellow background denotes an electorate win by a list member, or other incumbent. A ✓ or ✗ denotes status of any incumbent, win or lose respectively.						
Party	Candidate	Votes	%	±%	Party votes	%	±%
CDU	Jörg Schmidt	16,425	38.4	▲6.7	15,008	35.0	▲2.1
AfD	Mathias Weiser	14,661	34.3	▲4.4	13,758	32.1	▲3.9
BSW	Belinda Eißmann	5,321	12.4		6,279	14.7	
SPD	Juliane Pfeil	2,595	6.1	▼3.2	2,663	6.2	▼2.1
Left	Maria Grünler	1,248	2.9	▼9.3	1,100	2.6	▼8.2
Greens	Gerhard Liebscher	1,033	2.4	▼5.6	1,058	2.5	▼4.2
Freie Sachsen					673	1.6	
FW	Reinhold Dörfler	1,022	2.4	▼1.1	555	1.3	▼1.4
APT					461	1.1	
FDP	Lino Markfort	463	1.1	▼4.4	377	0.9	▼3.3
PARTEI					351	0.8	▼0.7
Values					167	0.4	
BD					99	0.2	
Bündnis C					72	0.2	
dieBasis					68	0.2	
Pirates					58	0.1	
V-Partei3					55	0.1	
ÖDP					27	0.1	
BüSo					23	0.1	
Informal votes		353			269		
Total valid votes		42,768			42,852		
Turnout		43,121	70.5	▲6.6			
CDU gain from AfD	Majority	1,764	4.1				

=== 2019 election ===
State election (2019): Vogtland 1
Notes:	Blue background denotes the winner of the electorate vote. Pink background denotes a candidate elected from their party list. Yellow background denotes an electorate win by a list member, or other incumbent. A ✓ or ✗ denotes status of any incumbent, win or lose respectively.						
Party	Candidate	Votes	%	±%	Party votes	%	±%
AfD	Frank Schaufel	9,444	30.0	▲18.5	8,983	28.5	▲17.2
CDU		9,364	29.8	▼3.3	9,967	31.6	▼4.7
Left		3,856	12.3	▼8.6	3,529	11.2	▼9.1
SPD		3,039	9.7	▼6.0	2,717	8.6	▼8.5
Greens		2,655	8.4	▲1.2	2,218	7.0	▲2.1
FDP		1,678	5.3	▲0.9	1,285	4.1	▲0.6
FW		1,396	4.4	▲2.5	719	2.3	▲1.2
APT					694	2.2	▲1.2
PARTEI					520	1.7	▲1.0
NPD					209	0.7	▼4.0
Verjüngungsforschung					169	0.5	
The Blue Party					106	0.3	
AdPM					102	0.3	
ÖDP					77	0.2	
Pirates					68	0.2	▼0.6
Humanists					56	0.2	
DKP					38	0.1	
PDV					34	0.1	
BüSo					14	0.0	▼0.1
Informal votes		395			322		
Total valid votes		31,432			31,505		
Turnout		31,827	61.2	▲14.7			
AfD gain from CDU	Majority	80	0.2				

=== 2014 election ===
State election (2014): Vogtland 1
Notes:	Blue background denotes the winner of the electorate vote. Pink background denotes a candidate elected from their party list. Yellow background denotes an electorate win by a list member, or other incumbent. A ✓ or ✗ denotes status of any incumbent, win or lose respectively.						
Party	Candidate	Votes	%	±%	Party votes	%	±%
CDU	Frank Heidan	8,140	33.1		8,943	36.3	
Left		5,137	20.9		4,999	20.3	
SPD		3,866	15.7		3,723	15.1	
AfD		2,832	11.5		2,784	11.3	
Greens		1,770	7.2		1,195	4.9	
FDP		1,086	4.4		865	3.5	
NPD		1,007	4.1		1,161	4.7	
FW		460	1.9		262	1.1	
APT					253	1.0	
Pirates		265	1.1		186	0.8	
PARTEI					169	0.7	
DSU					49	0.2	
Pro Germany Citizens' Movement					25	0.1	
BüSo					23	0.1	
Informal votes		486			412		
Total valid votes		24,563			24,637		
Turnout		25,049	46.5	▼8.3			
CDU win new seat	Majority	3,003	12.2				

== See also ==
- Politics of Saxony
- Landtag of Saxony
