= Robert Hochbaum =

German politician (born 1954)

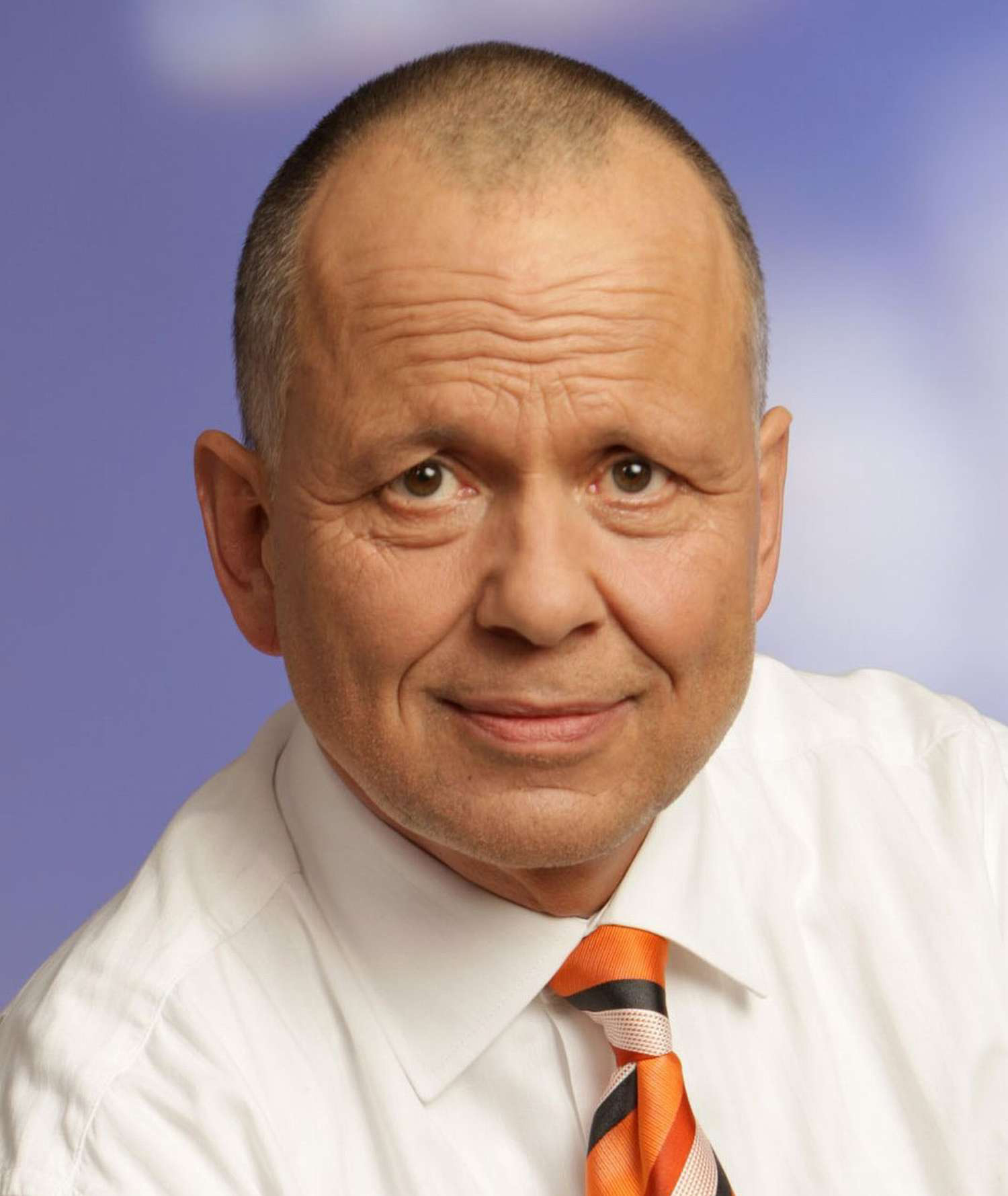
Hochbaum in 2013

Robert Hochbaum is a politician of the Christian Democratic Union, one of the two big-tent political parties in Germany. He was a member of the Bundestag from 2002 to 2017, by consecutively winning the Vogtlandkreis electoral district of Saxony in the federal elections of 2002, 2005, 2009 and 2013.

Hochbaum was born in Pforzheim, Baden-Württemberg on 5 June 1954. He joined the CDU in 1983, and became member the connected Christian Democratic Employees' Association in 1985. In 1982, he started working at the Bundesagentur für Arbeit, the Federal Employment Agency of Germany and became head of the job center in Auerbach (Vogtland) in 1991. He temporarily served in the Bundeswehr and is now a reserve officer.

He was a member of the Defense Committee, and chairman of the sub-committee "Disarmament, Arms Control and Non-Proliferation" from 2005, saying that "Disarmament or arms control and the problem of the spread of chemical and nuclear weapons are playing an increasingly important role worldwide. The developments in Syria, North Korea and Iran, for example, demonstrate this very clearly. The current situation in Crimea and Ukraine also illustrate how quickly crises can arise and how important confidence-building measures remain, which are also part of our work."

Hochbaum, an evangelical Christian, is in his second marriage. He has three children from the first marriage.
