= Rolf Schwanitz =

German politician

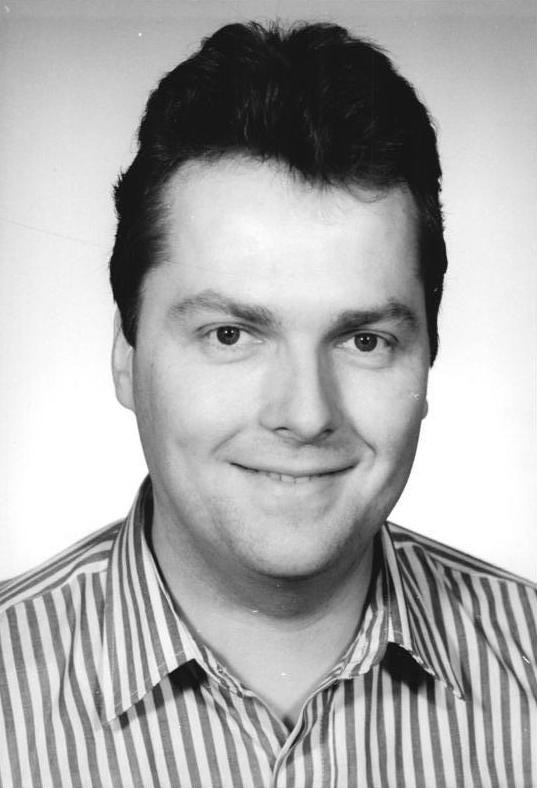
- Rolf Schwanitz (1990)
- Born: 2 April 1959 (age 67); Gera, Bezirk Gera, East Germany
- Occupation: Politician
- Political party: SDP; SPD
- Children: 2

Rolf Schwanitz (born 2 April 1959) is a German politician. From 1998 till 2005, he served under Federal Chancellor Schröder as a Minister of State in the Federal Chancellery. He was then, from 2005 till 2009, Parliamentary State Secretary in the Health ministry under Federal Chancellor Merkel.

== Life ==
=== Early years ===
Schwanitz was born in Gera, a long established city some 75 km (40 miles) west of Dresden, and then in the heart of East Germany's southern industrial region. After successful completion of his school career he undertook a professional training in construction work. He then studied Business administration at Jena and Law at East Berlin. He emerged from his tertiary education with degrees in Engineering Economics and in Jurisprudence, before taking a position as a research assistant in the Business Administration department at the Technology Institute at Zwickau.

=== Politics ===
In October 1989 Rolf Schwanitz joined New Forum, a political movement originating in Zwickau and associated with the Peaceful Revolution that soon afterwards put an end to the German Democratic Republic as a stand-alone one-party state. In November 1989, in the same month that the Berlin Wall was breached, he switched to the (in East Germany newly refounded) SDP (party). Following German reunification in August 1990 the new party quickly merged with its (till now, and since 1946, purely West German) counterpart, which made Schwanitz a member of the SPD (party). Between 1993 and 2010 he served as the party's deputy regional chairman in Saxony. In 2009, following the resignation of Thomas Jurk, and until his successor Martin Dulig was elected, Schwanitz briefly served as acting regional party chairman in Saxony.

He is also a member of the leadership circle of the Seeheimer Kreis, a working group of SPD politicians that describes itself as "undogmatic and pragmatic".

=== Religion ===
A party colleague has described Schwanitz as "a passionately convinced atheist". Since 2010 he has supported the creation of a working group on "Secularism and secularists in the SPD". The objective of such a group should be that "Religious and non-religious communities must rank equally, and enjoy the same level of respect from the state, acting on behalf of society, with no privileges allowed to one side." He wants to end "gender based discrimination involving those working with the church. The churches enjoy exemptions involving decisions on promotions and pay levels". He goes on, "If a third of the German population, sharing the non-religious perspective, also recognise the issue, then we need to raise it up the public agenda with an SPD working group".

Schwanitz was very sharply critical of the public representation of the papal visit to Germany in September 2011, when he was one the members of parliament who refused to attend Pope Benedict's high-profile speech to the Bundestag.

=== National politics ===
Following the East German national election on 18 March 1990, between March and October 1990, Rolf Schwanitz was a member of the country's first (and last) freely elected People's Chamber (Volkskammer), by now a member of the SDP and representing the Karl-Marx-Stadt electoral district.

He was one of the 144 deputies in the chamber who on 3 October 1990, as part of the German reunification process, became members of the Bundestag (National Assembly) of a reunited Germany. In the first post unification election, which took place in December 1990, Schwanitz's name was on the SPD list for the Saxony electoral district and he was elected to the Bundestag. He enjoyed electoral success in the Bundestag elections in 1994, 1998, 2002, 2005 and 2009, but did not contest a seat in 2013.

In the 2005 election he attracted nationwide criticism with an election poster showing the coffins of US soldiers, inside a cargo plane, being returned from the Iraq War. The headline on the poster stated, "She would have sent [German] soldiers" ("Sie hätte Soldaten geschickt"). The "She" in question was the (then) opposition leader Angela Merkel. The poster was accompanied by a recommendation for the voters in Saxony to vote for the SPD candidate, Rolf Schwanitz. Although Schwanitz subsequently served in a coalition government under Merkel, the context of the 2005 election was one in which their respective parties were competing nationally for votes, and the issue of whether Germany should send troops to Iraq in defiance of a pacifist tradition established since 1945, and in support of the US army, was one seriously divisive issue between mainstream parties of the moderate left (SPD) and the moderate right (CDU). The poster, intended to highlight Angela Merkel's position on the Iraq War, instead attracted national media criticism of Schwanitz. The hard hitting image of American coffins was considered tasteless: use of the image by the (originally East German) socialist atheist Schwanitz for electoral purposes had overstepped the boundaries of acceptability.

=== Ministerial Office ===
During 1990, Rolf Schwanitz served in East Germany's last government under Prime Minister Lothar de Maizière. Schwanitz was appointed a Parliamentary Secretary of State, working in the department of the Justice Minister Kurt Wünsche.

The 1998 election ended the 16 year chancellorship of Helmut Kohl. The SPD and Green parties received respectively 40.9% and 6.7% of the national vote. Candidates from receiving less than 5% of the national vote are excluded from the Bundestag, so that the combined 47.6% of the national vote translated into 345 of the 669 seats in the Bundestag, creating a majority for a new SPD/Green coalition government under Gerhard Schröder. On 27 October 1998 Rolf Schwanitz was appointed Minister of State in Schröder's Chancellery. At the same time, between 1998 and 2002, he was Federal Government Commissioner for the New Federal States (i.e. former East Germany). The outcome of the 2002 election was close, but it enabled Gerhard Schröder to form a second coalition government with the Greens: this time Rolf Schwanitz was not a member of it.

The largest two parties both lost ground in the 2005 election, and in the end a "grand coalition" was formed between the two of them, leaving the business of opposition to the less mainstream PDS, The Greens and the FDP. Within the governing CDU/CSU/SPD coalition government, now led by Angela Merkel, Schanitz again received a job, this time as Parliamentary Secretary of State for Health, working with the Health Minister Ulla Schmidt (SPD).

The principal losers in the 2009 election were the SPD. Rolf Schwanitz resigned his office as the Social Democrats went into opposition.

== Other activities ==
- Friedrich Ebert Foundation (FES), Member of the Board of Trustees
- Giordano Bruno Foundation, member of the advisory board.
- Institute for Secular Law, member of the advisory board.
