= Vogtland =

German region

Coordinates: 50°24′49″N 12°10′42″E

County of Vogtland, County of Greiz Vögte von Weida, Gera und Plauen (German) Terra Advocatorum (Latin) Královský Rychtář (Czech)
- 11th century–1563
- Coat of arms

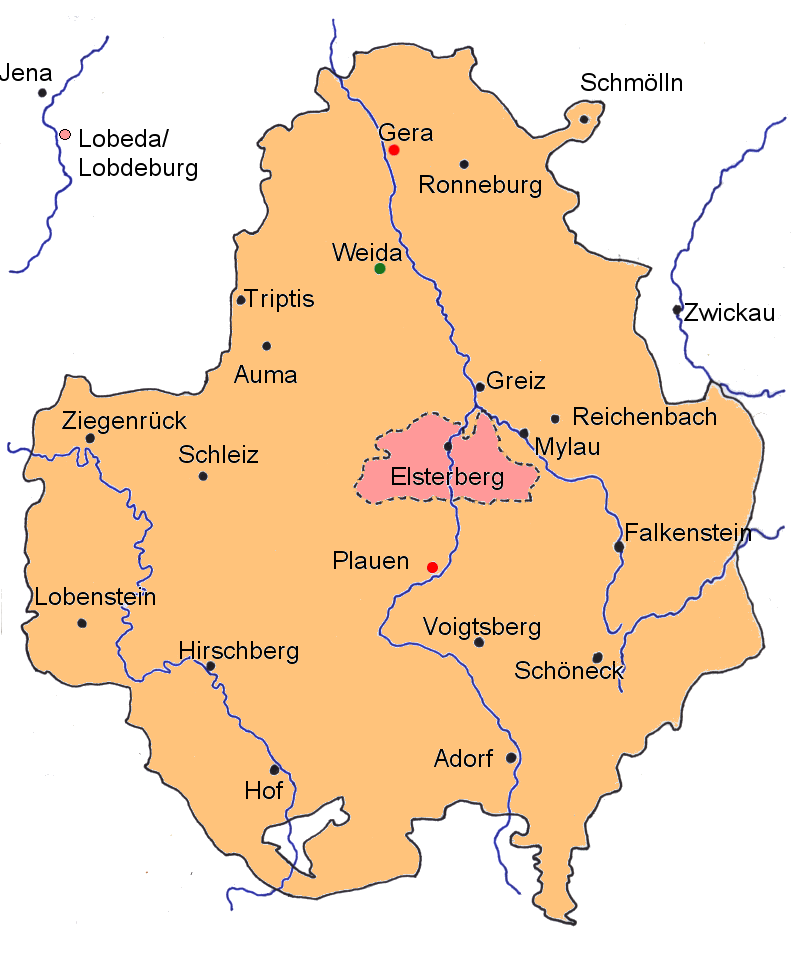
- Map of the Vogtland in 1350
- Status: State of the Holy Roman Empire
- Capital: Weida (Osterburg), Gera, Plauen
- Common languages: "Vogtländisch" (East Franconian German, North Bavarian)
- Government: Principality
- Historical era: Middle Ages
  - Established: 11th century
  - Bohemian protectorate: 1327
  - Land exchange with Margraviate of Meissen: 1357
  - Power struggles with Electorate of Saxony: fourteenth–sixteenth centuries
  - Restored to Vögte after Battle of Mühlberg: 1547
  - Annexed to Saxony: 1563
- Today part of: Czech Republic: ∟Karlovy Vary; Germany: ∟Bavaria; ∟Saxony; ∟Thuringia

Vogtland (German: [ˈfoːktlant]; Czech: Fojtsko) is a region spanning the German states of Bavaria, Saxony and Thuringia and north-western Bohemia in the Czech Republic. It overlaps with and is largely contained within Euroregio Egrensis. The name alludes to the former leadership by the Vögte ("advocates" or "lords protector") of Weida, Gera and Plauen.

== Government ==
For elections to the Landtag of Saxony, Vogtland has three state constituencies:

- Vogtland 1
- Vogtland 2
- Vogtland 3

== Geography ==
=== Natural geography ===
The landscape of the Vogtland is sometimes described as idyllic, thanks to its fields, meadows and wooded hilltops. In the south and southeast, Vogtland rises to a low or mid-height mountain range also called Oberes Vogtland, or Upper Vogtland. Here, monocultural coniferous forest is the predominant form of vegetation. The Vogtland's highest mountain is Schneehübel, reaching 974 metres; another remarkable landmark is the Schneckenstein, 883 m above sea level, which gained some renown for its (falsely) alleged unique abundance of topaz crystals. Its mountains spread from the Ore Mountains in the south-east to the Fichtel Mountains in the south-west, including the Elster Mountains.

Neighbouring regions are Franconian Forest, Ore Mountains, Thuringian Highland and Fichtel Mountains. The south-eastern part of the Vogtland belongs to Ore Mountain/Vogtland Nature Park, a protected area comparable to a national park.

In its northern part, which averages around 250 m above sea level, the landscape is marked by several river valleys, as the White Elster, the Zwickauer Mulde and the Göltzsch have their spring in the Vogtland, while the Saale flows through Bavaria and Thuringia in the west of Vogtland.

=== Cultural geography ===
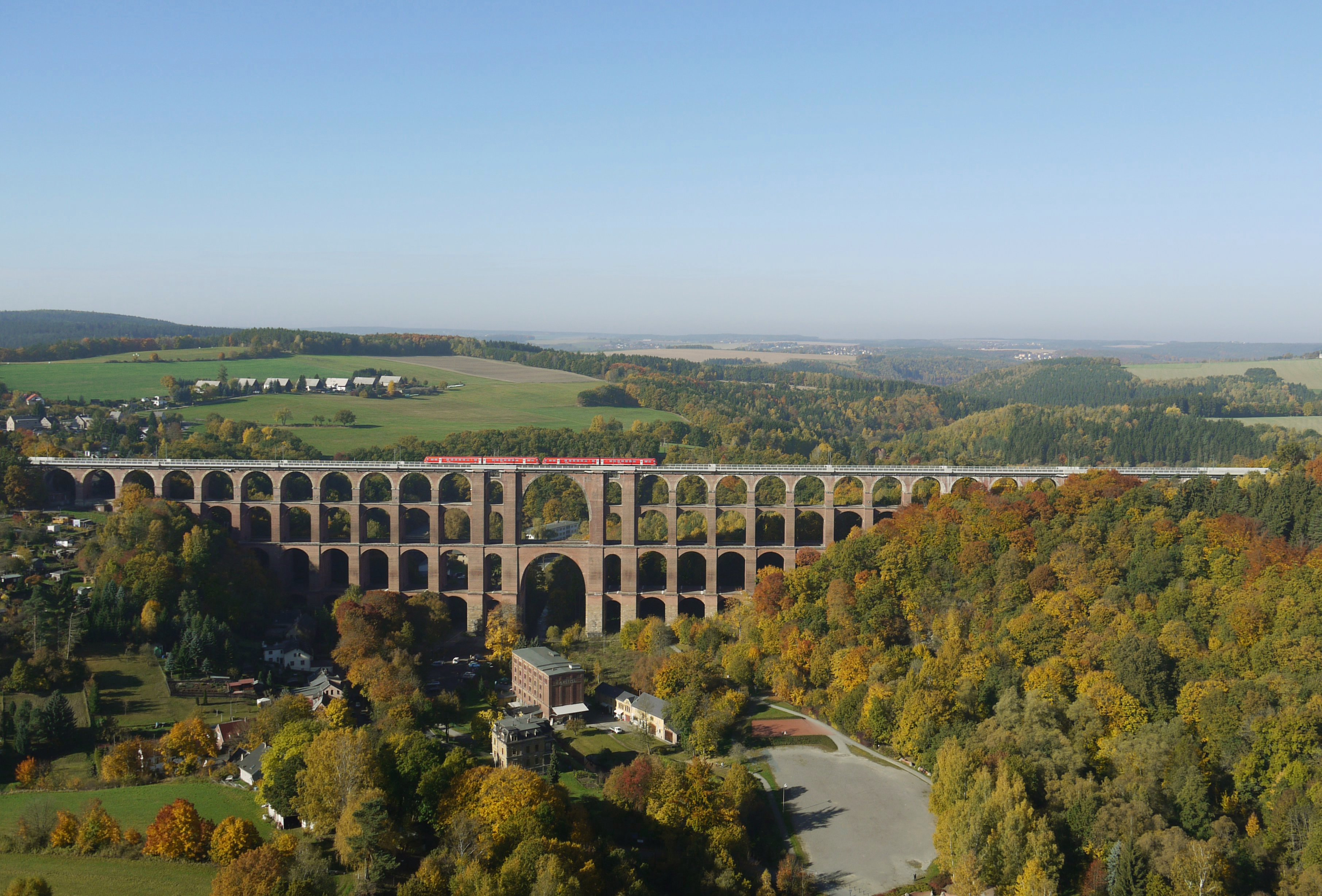
Göltzsch Viaduct on the Leipzig–Hof railway between Reichenbach im Vogtland and Netzschkau in 2012

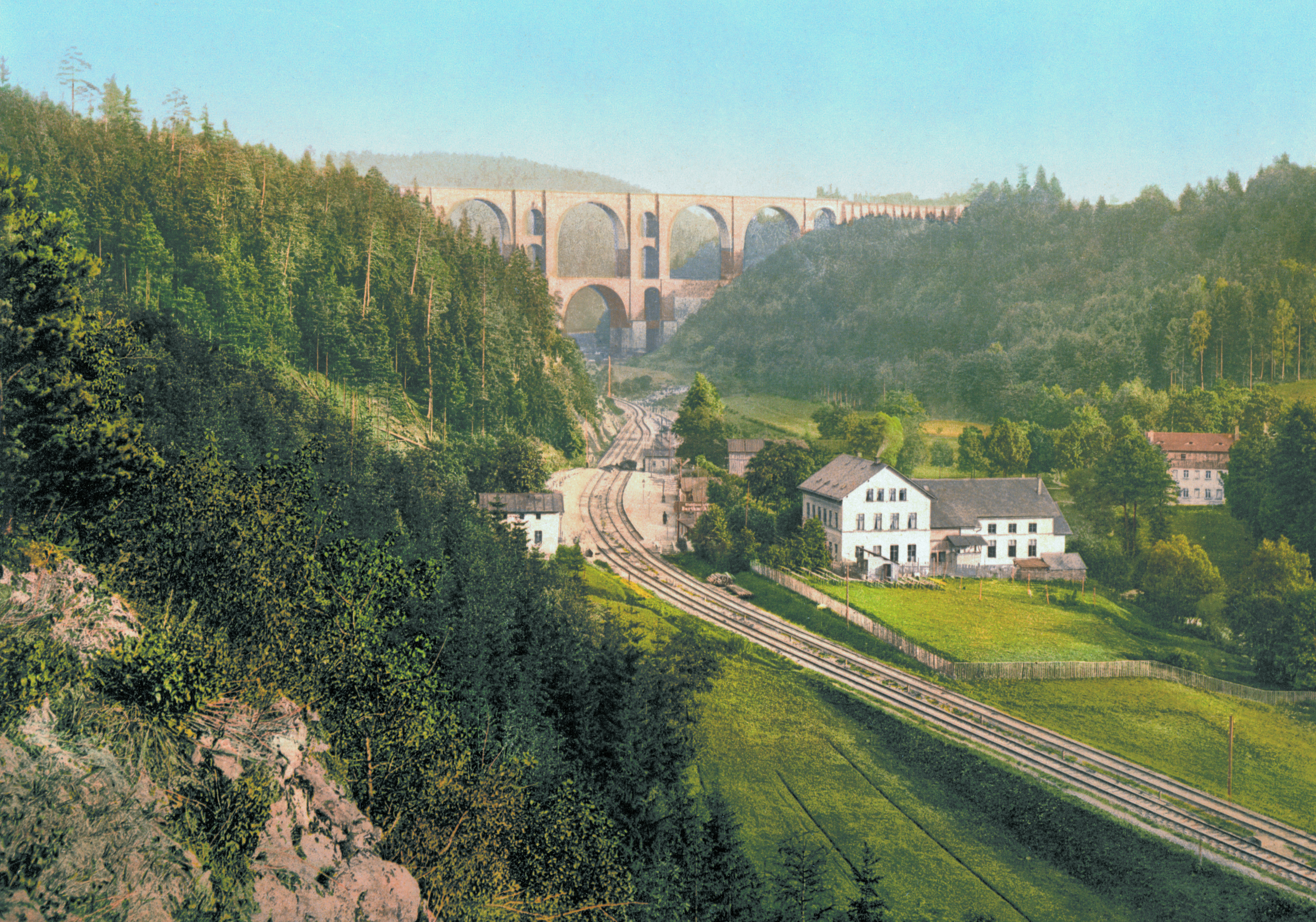
Elster Viaduct on Leipzig–Hof railway (with Elster Valley Railway below) in 1900

The river valley geography in Vogtland's north made it necessary to build comparatively big bridges to channel railroad and automobile traffic streams. Particularly famous are the Göltzsch Viaduct between Reichenbach im Vogtland and Netzschkau, the world's largest bridge built of bricks, and her "little sister", the Elster Viaduct. Both of them are in use as railroad bridges closing the gap between Dresden and Nuremberg.

As road bridges are concerned, the major bridges forming part of the A 72 near Hof, Pirk and Weißensand are the most important ones, while one urban bridge poses as a rarity: The Syratal Viaduct is Europe's biggest mono-arch bridge made of chunked natural stone - to be found in Plauen, commonly called Friedensbrücke.

Integral part of the Vogtland landscape are its reservoirs, the shores of which mostly are popular holiday and camping destinations.

== Notable cities ==
Plauen is the largest city and seat of the Vogtlandkreis county and informally known as the "capital of the Vogtland". A university city, Gera is the largest city of the historical Vogtland region, yet, also a link in the Thüringer Städtekette (Thuringia city chain) ranging eastwards from Eisenach via Erfurt, Weimar, and Jena to Gera.

Other towns of regional significance are:

=== In Saxony ===
- Reichenbach im Vogtland, Große Kreisstadt and site of the Vogtland's landmark, the Göltzsch viaduct, the largest brick bridge made of bricks, spanning from Reichenbach to the adjacent town of Netzschkau.
- Auerbach/Vogtl., Große Kreisstadt
- Oelsnitz im Vogtland, Große Kreisstadt
- Klingenthal, Große Kreisstadt

=== In Thuringia ===
- Greiz, former capital of the Principality of Reuss-Greiz, the smallest principality of the former Holy Roman Empire
- Weida, ancestral seat of the first Vogts and thus often referred to as the cradle of the Vogtland.

=== In Bavaria ===
- Hof, university city and capital of the Hof county.

=== In the Czech Republic ===
- Cheb, capital of the Cheb District as well as seat of the University of West Bohemia Faculty of Economics

== History ==
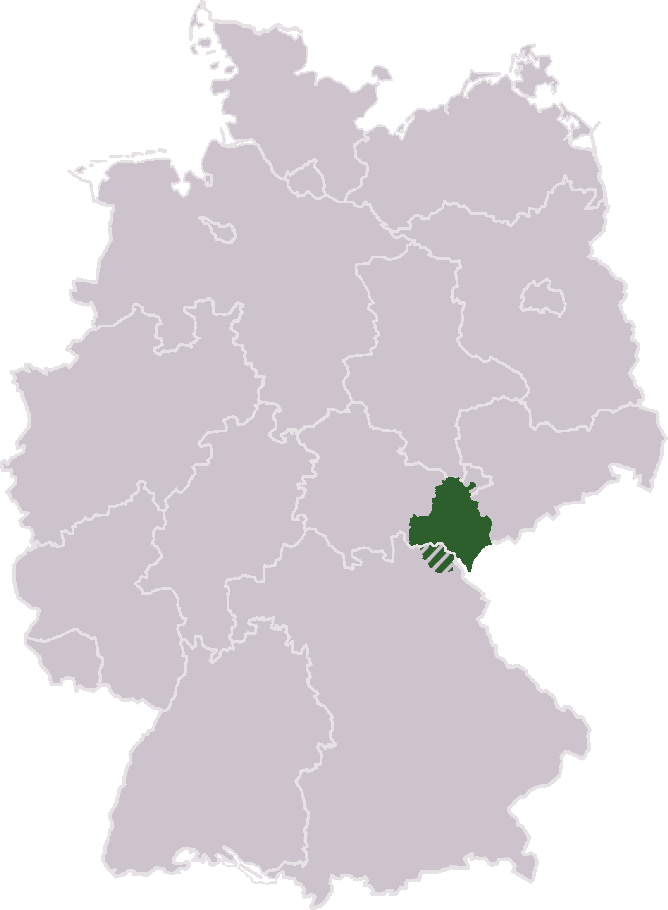
Land der Vögte

The larger settlemental region surrounding Gera has been recorded in documents as early as the year 1000. It is thought to have been inhabited since late 7th or early 8th century by Slavic Settlers who tribally belonged to the Sorbs. Large portions of the Vogtland, however, were still covered with pristine forests and were not settled before the High Middle Ages, especially until the period called the Deutsche Ostsiedlung. Those settlers arrived mainly in eleventh and twelfth centuries, ethnically being Slavic or German, coming from areas of traditionally older settlement like Franconia, Thuringia and Saxony. Even today this can be traced along lines dividing dialectal areas, providing linguistic differences at close distances of settlement while demonstrating peculiar commonalities with varieties spoken in more distant regions of Germany. For instance, in a number of villages of the upper Vogtland even nowadays a dialect is spoken similar to that in Oberpfalz (/ou/ sounds instead of /u:/ as in Kou (en. cow) etc.).

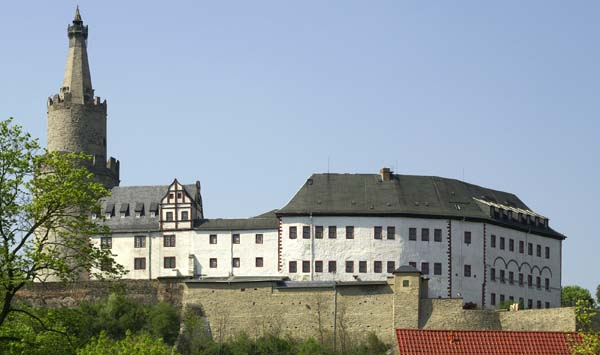
The Osterburg, Seat of the Vogts of Weida

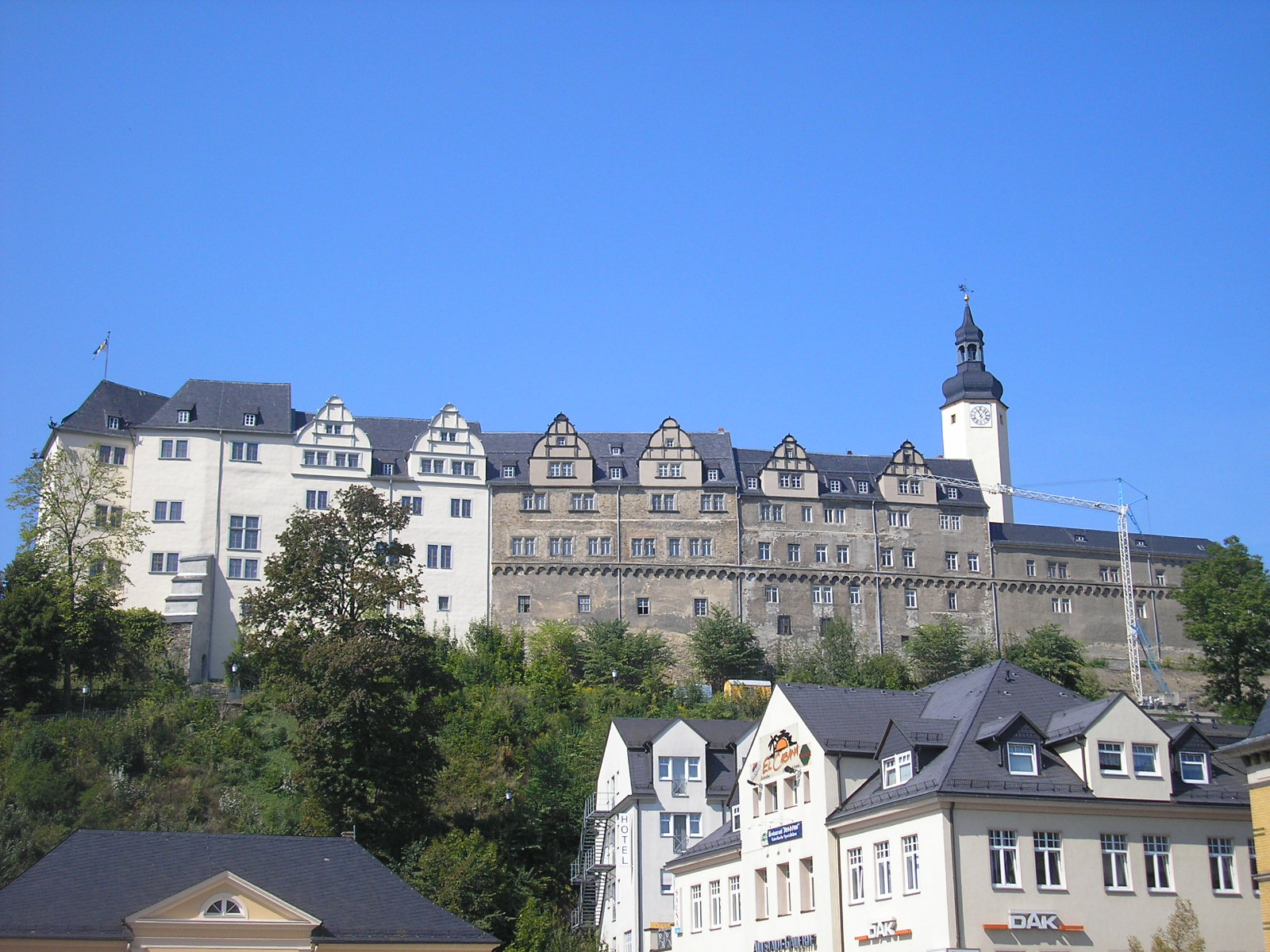
The Upper Château in Greiz, Reussian Residency

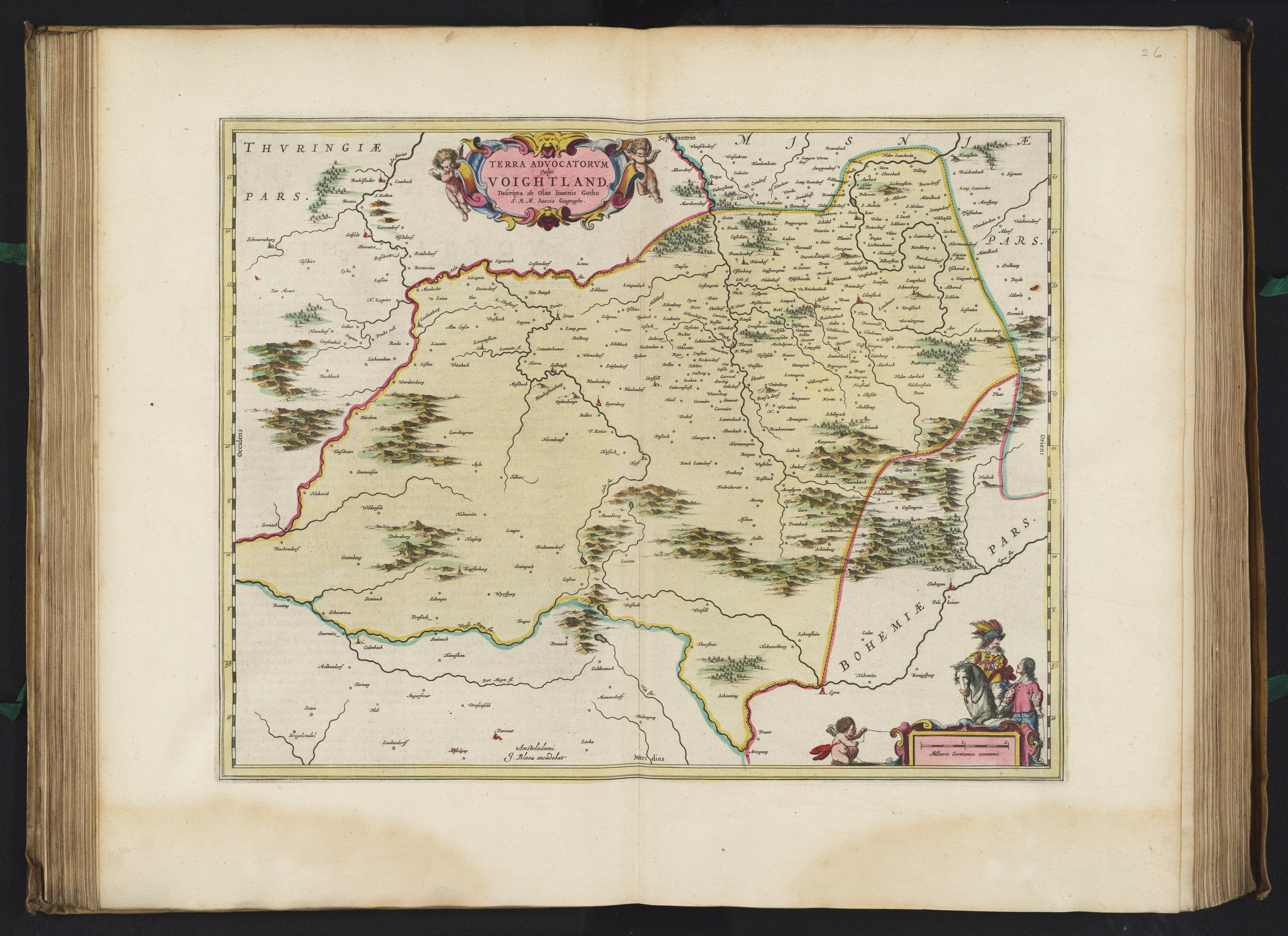
Map of 1662

The place name Vogtland (formerly also known as Voigtland, Latin: terra advocatorum) originates in the rule of the Vogts (bailiffs) in this region from the eleventh to the sixteenth century AD, specifically in reference to the Vogts of Weida, Gera and Plauen. In the 12th century, Emperor Barbarossa appointed the first Vogts as administrators of his imperial forest areas in the east to facilitate his rule. Their headquarters was the Osterburg at Weida, thus giving it the reputation as the cradle of the Vogtland. Among the privileges of the Vogts were the endowment over minerals still unextracted from the ground (Bergregal) and the entitlement to regulating mint and coinage affairs (Münzregal), which were both handed down to them by Kaiser Frederick II in 1232. In the 12th and 13th centuries, the Vogts of Weida gradually became independent of the Quedlinburg Abbey on the lands they administered for it.

As in the 14th century claims to power by the Margraves of Meissen emerged, Henry of Plauen submitted to the tenure-based regnancy of the Bohemian Crown, excepting only the dominion of Voigtsberg, that stayed tenured to the Reich. In 1349, his equinomic son Henry also handed Voigtsberg over to Bohemian tenure; thus the whole Vogtland had become a Reichsafterlehn (a specific status of tenure). In 1357 an exchange of territories was agreed with by the Margraviate of Meissen, effectually making Wiedersberg, Liebau, Adorf, Pausa, Neuenkirchen and Hirschberg (among others) Meissenian while Borna, Geithein and Kohren were handed to the Vogt. The exchange was heavily disputed by branch line cousins of Henry's. The Lords of Plauen, as they called themselves, retrieved Auerbach, Pausa and Liebau as Meissenian tenure in 1379. Since 1426 the Lords of Plauen were Burggraves of Meissen and found themselves in constant power struggles with the Saxon Prince Electors.

Bohemian King George of Podiebrad took the burning of the royal castle of Graslitz due to fights between Henry II of Plauen and his enemies to be an occasion to withdraw his tenure and have the Vogtland occupied by Ernest in 1466. Henry II von Plauen had fallen into disgrace with him for his open opposition against nobility. Thus, Ernest received tenure over the Vogtland which, at the occasion of the Leipziger Teilung in 1485, was transferred to the House of Ernest while keeping the Bergregal under joint control. In 1547, after the Battle of Mühlberg, the Ernestines forfeited the tenure over the Vogtland and Kaiser Ferdinand I handed it down to his Chancellor Henry IV of Plauen, making Maurice, Elector of Saxony co-tenant to the Vogtland tenure. Henry V and Henry VI could not settle up their debts towards Augustus, Elector of Saxony. Due to arrears in Tithe and other liabilities the brothers pawned the Vogtland to the Electorate of Saxony in 1559.

With Heinrich VI the rule of the Vogts of Plauen over parts of the Vogtland ended, as he could not redeem the pawn any more. In 1566, Augustus acquired the office and towns of Voigtsberg, Oelsnitz, Plauen and Pausa. Matters were further resettled in 1657, among other transactions assigning office over Plauen, Voigtsberg and Pausa to Saxe-Zeitz (a secundogeniture of Electoral Saxony) while schriftsässige Rittergüter and the town of Schöneck remained in the possession of the Electorate. In 1718, after the extinction of the Saxe-Zeitz line, the areas in concern reverted to the Electorate. Apart from the Saxon share, the forests around Auerbach and Schöneck remained an exceptional area being both electoral and ducal at the same time.

The area, which is now generally known as Vogtland, lies mostly in the present-day state of Thuringia, with a small part belonging to the Free State of Bavaria. Over time the dominions of the Vogts (bailiffs) extended beyond the original Vogtland into the Western Ore Mountains, with areas extending into what is now the Czech Republic. This cross-border Vogtland, as ruled by the Vogts (varying in its extent), stretched over 1,338 square miles over the centuries, which is roughly the size of Santa Clara County in California.

== Transportation and infrastructure ==
Two major motorways (A 72 and A 9) serve the Vogtland with connection to the surrounding regions and cities. Providing connections locally within the region and beyond state and national borders, Vogtlandbahn is a private railway company which operates the Vogtland Express. Vogtlandbahn services includes direct connections to Leipzig, Regensburg and Berlin independently from Deutsche Bahn and cooperates with Bohemian (Czech) railway company Viamont as well as with Bavaria-based Alex train services to provide further connections to Munich, Prague and further destinations of note in Euregio Egrensis and beyond. There is a bus service that runs from Vogtland to Berlin.

While the European Union develops into a Europe of Regions, Vogtland could experience an increase of significance for transiting traffic and tourism for the region of Euregio Egrensis, independently from the political meaning of Vogtlandkreis.

== See also ==
- Vogtlandkreis (a district in Saxony covering a part of the Vogtland)
- Euregio Egrensis (the EU-based structure of a regions-based Europe as rough equivalent of the Vogtland beyond current nationality-based structuring)
- Bohemian track
