= Rudolf Braun (politician) =

German politician

Member of the Bundestag
- In office 1994–1998

Personal details
- Born: 25 June 1955 (age 70) Falkenstein, Saxony, East Germany (now Germany)
- Party: CDU
- Children: 2

Rudolf Braun is a German politician of the Christian Democratic Union (CDU) and former member of the German Bundestag.

== Life ==
Braun was a member of the German Bundestag from 10 November 1994 to 26 October 1998 (one term). He was elected via a direct mandate from constituency 328 in Saxony. He was a full member of the Committee on the Interior and a deputy member of the Committee on Economic Cooperation and Development. He is married and father of two children.
