= Netzschkau =

- Town
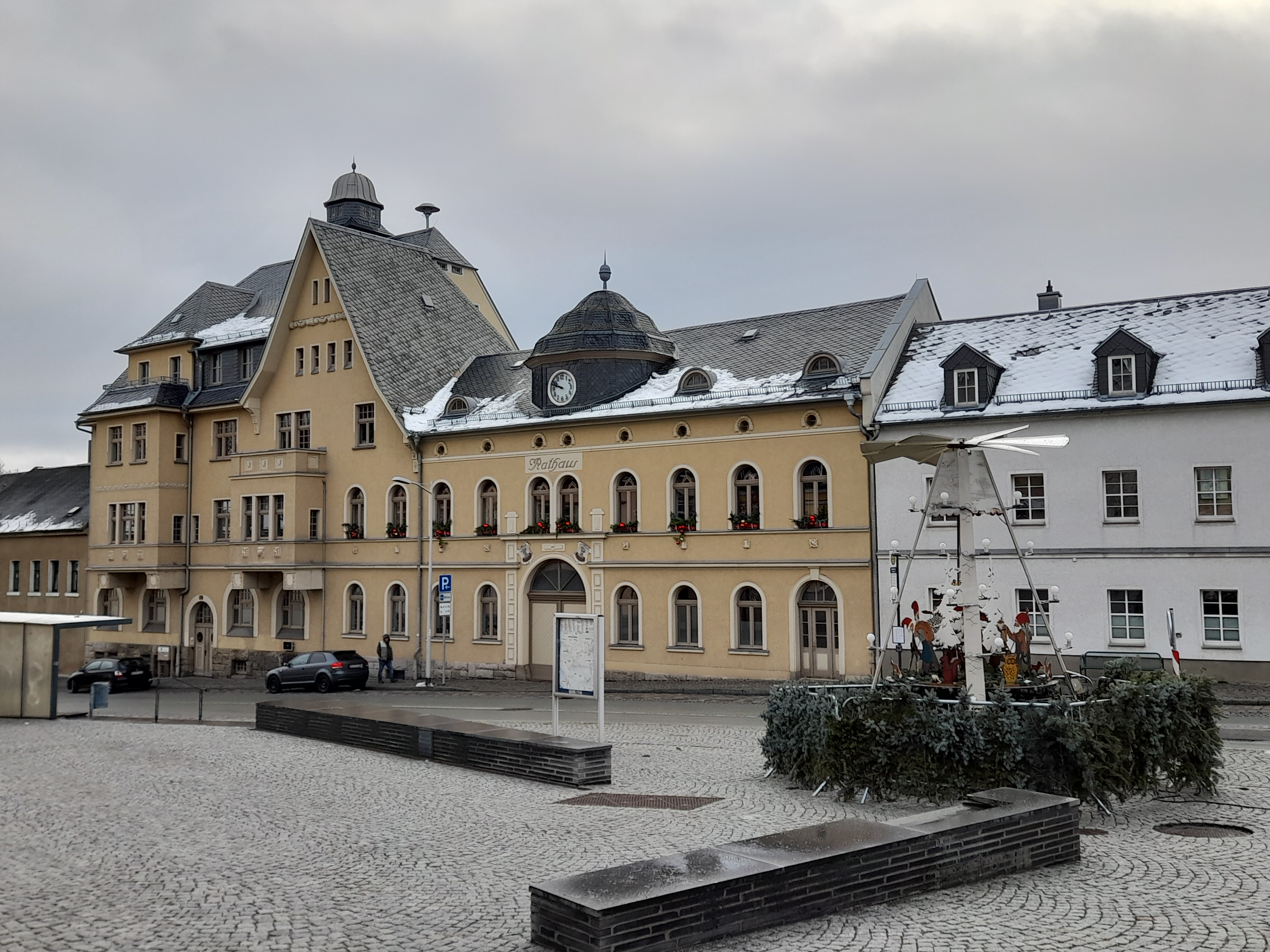
- Town hall

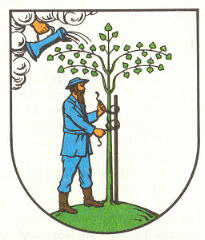
- Coat of arms

- Location of Netzschkau within Vogtlandkreis district
- Interactive map of Netzschkau
- Location within Germany Location within Saxony
- Coordinates: 50°37′N 12°15′E
- Country: Germany
- State: Saxony
- District: Vogtlandkreis
- Subdivisions: Kernstadt; 6 Ortsteile

Government
  - Mayor (2020–27): Mike Purfürst

Area
  - Total: 12.51 km^{2} (4.83 sq mi)
- Elevation: 378 m (1,240 ft)

Population (2025-12-31)
  - Total: 3,570
  - Density: 285/km^{2} (739/sq mi)
- Time zone: UTC+01:00 (CET)
  - Summer (DST): UTC+02:00 (CEST)
- Postal codes: 08491
- Dialling codes: 03765
- Vehicle registration: V, AE, OVL, PL, RC
- Website: www.netzschkau.de

Netzschkau (German pronunciation: [ˈnɛtʃkaʊ]) is a town in the Vogtlandkreis district, in the Free State of Saxony, in eastern Germany. It is situated 6 km southeast of Greiz, and 21 km southwest of Zwickau.

== Demographics ==
=== Historical population ===
Development of population (from 1960 as of 31 December):

1687 - 1910

- 1687: 200
- 1814: 1,058
- 1834: 1,594
- 1880: 3,797
- 1900: 7,426

1933 - 2001

- 1933: 7,274
- 1960: 7,426
- 1998: 4,856 1
- 1999: 4,732
- 2001: 4,687

2003 - 2012

- 2003: 4,544
- 2005: 4,361
- 2007: 4,299
- 2008: 4,251
- 2012: 4,149

From 2013

- 2013: 4,107

Data source since 1998: Statistisches Landesamt Sachsen
