= Auerbach (Vogtland) =

Town in Saxony, Germany

Auerbach Auerbach/Vogtl.
- Große Kreisstadt
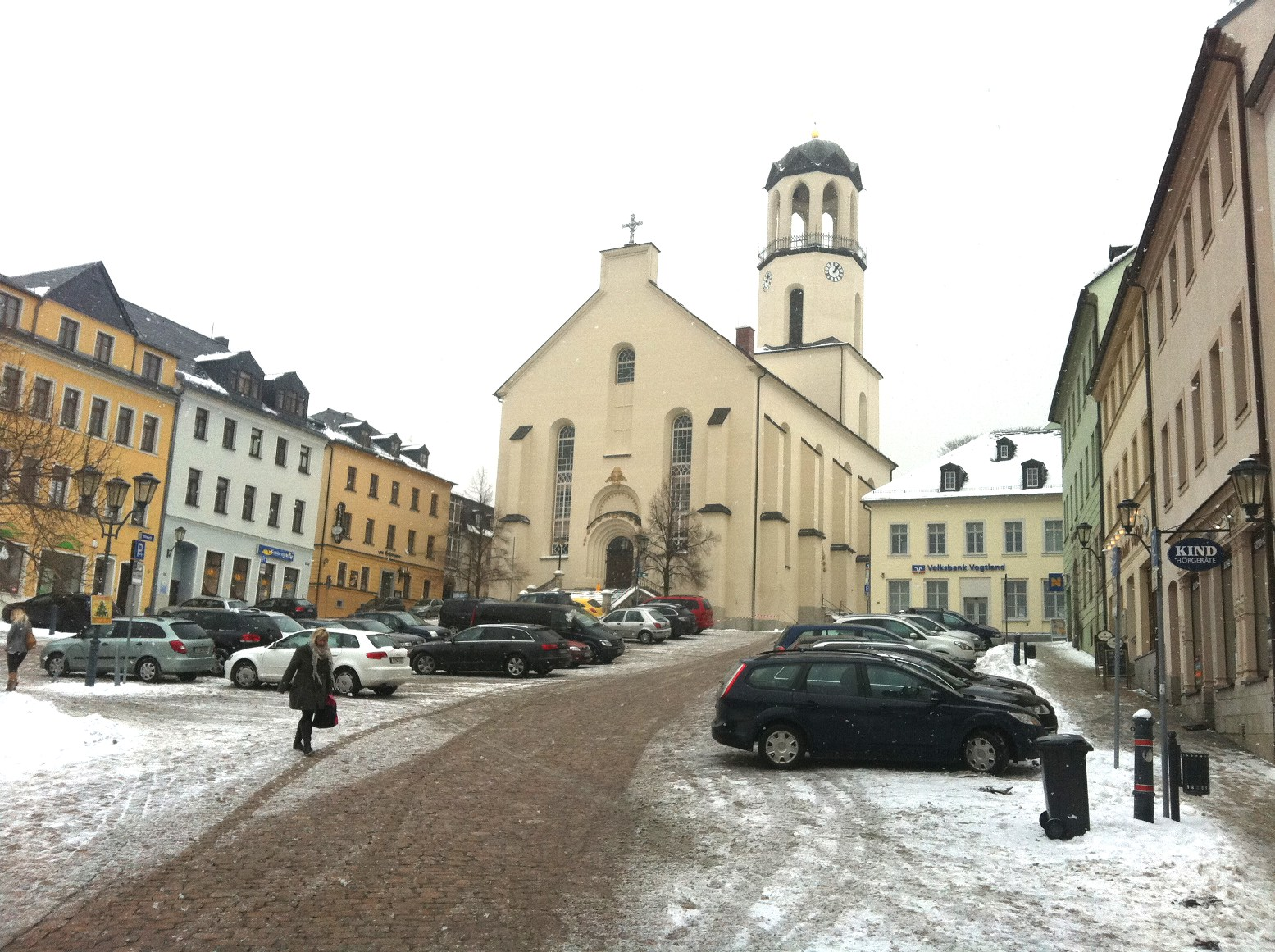
- Church of Saint Lawrence in the center of Auerbach

- Coat of arms

- Location of Auerbach within Vogtlandkreis district
- Interactive map of Auerbach
- Location within Germany Location within Saxony
- Coordinates: 50°30′34″N 12°24′0″E
- Country: Germany
- State: Saxony
- District: Vogtlandkreis
- Subdivisions: 5

Government
  - Mayor (2022–29): Jens Scharff (Ind.)

Area
  - Total: 55.52 km^{2} (21.44 sq mi)
- Elevation: 555 m (1,821 ft)

Population (2025-12-31)
  - Total: 17,061
  - Density: 307.3/km^{2} (795.9/sq mi)
- Time zone: UTC+01:00 (CET)
  - Summer (DST): UTC+02:00 (CEST)
- Postal codes: 08209
- Dialling codes: 03744
- Vehicle registration: V, AE, OVL, PL, RC
- Website: www.stadt-auerbach.de

Auerbach (German pronunciation: [ˈaʊɐbax]. Official name Auerbach/Vogtl.) is a town in the Vogtlandkreis, Saxony, Germany. It is the regional centre of the eastern Vogtland. The economy is mainly based on textile manufacturing, food processing and machine industry. After Plauen and Reichenbach, Auerbach is the third most populous town in the Vogtlandkreis.

Auerbach was mentioned for the first time in 1282. The town is situated at the declivities above the river Göltzsch at the foot of a castle tower from the 12th century. Landmarks include the towers of the St. Laurentius church, the Catholic Zum Heiligen Kreuz church and the 43.9-metre-high (144 ft) tower of the castle. The three tall buildings give Auerbach its nickname “the Three Towers Town”.

== Demographics ==
Historical population (from 1960, as on 31 December):

1834 to 1960

- 1834: 2,985
- 1875: 5,277
- 1880: 6,258
- 1910: 12,721
- 1933: 19,597
- 1946: 18,708 ^{1}
- 1950: 21,765 ^{2}

1971 to 2008

- 1971: 18,714
- 1981: 18,449
- 1984: 21,617
- 1997: 20,425
- 2001: 19,675
- 2005: 21,110
- 2008: 20,340

After 2012

- 2012: 19,300
- 2013: 19,076
- 2015: 18,893
- 2023: 17,427

Data source from 1998: Saxon State Statistical Office
^{1} 29 October
^{2} 31 August

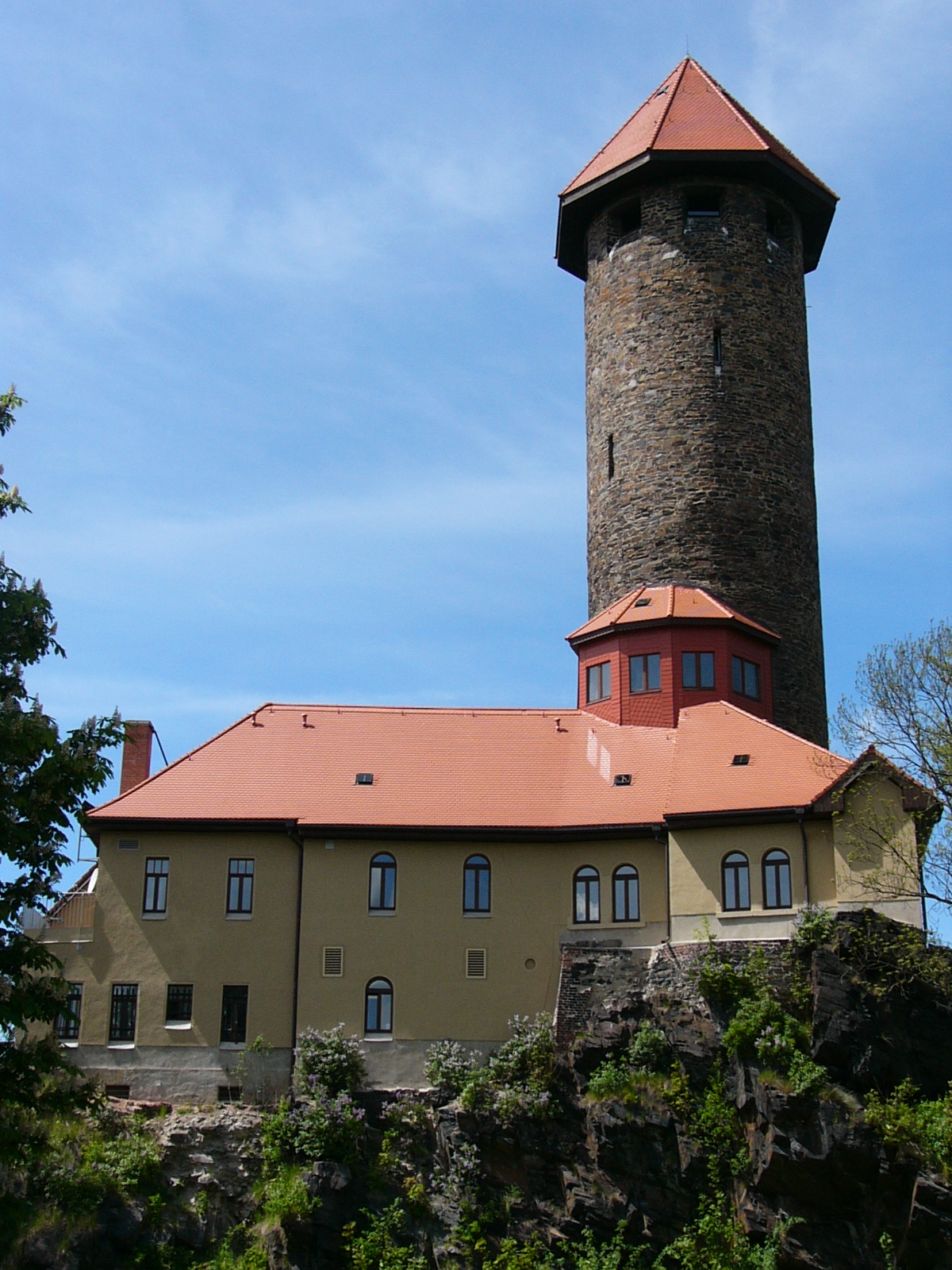
Auerbach Castle

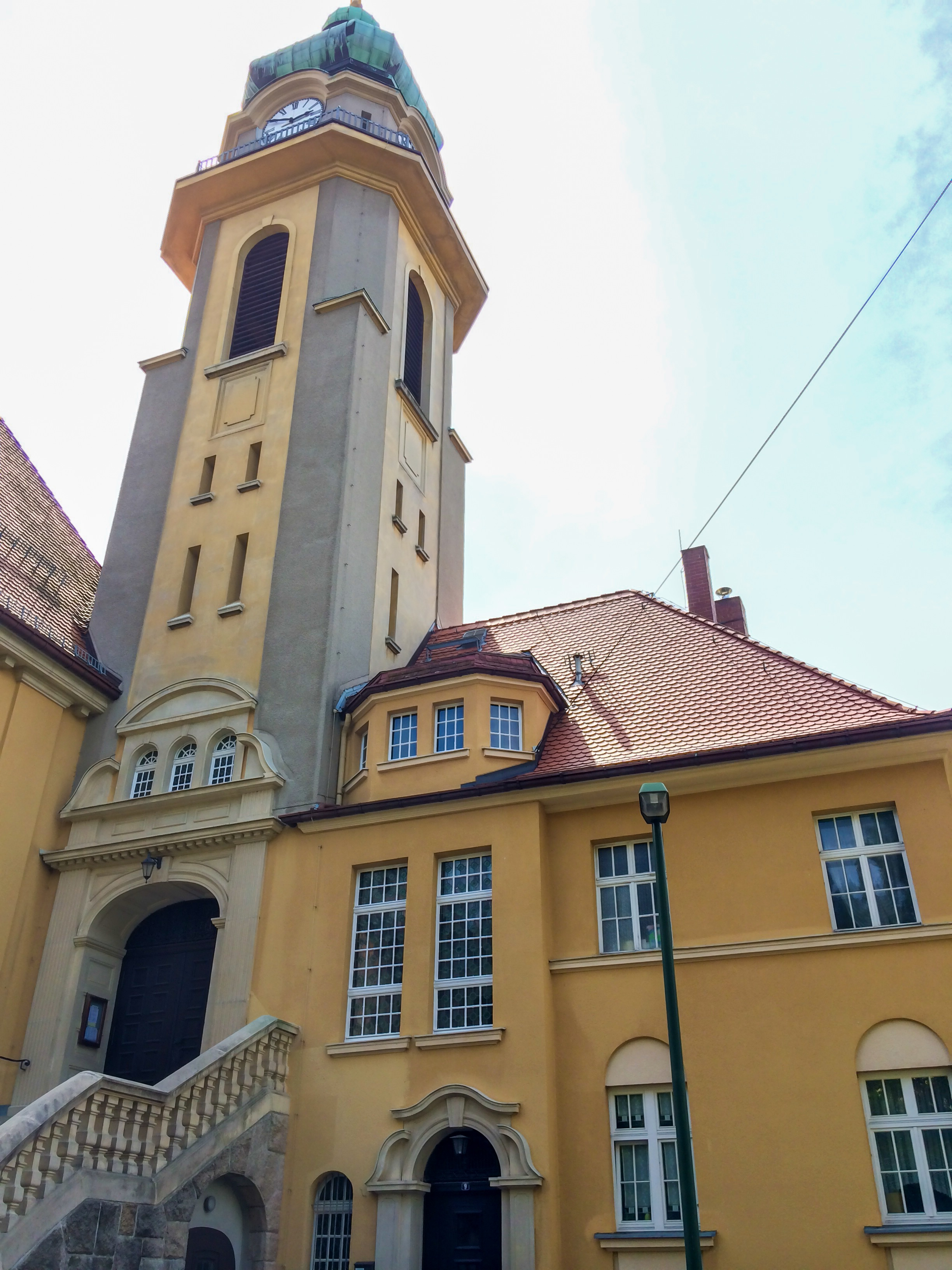
Zum Heiligen Kreuz Church

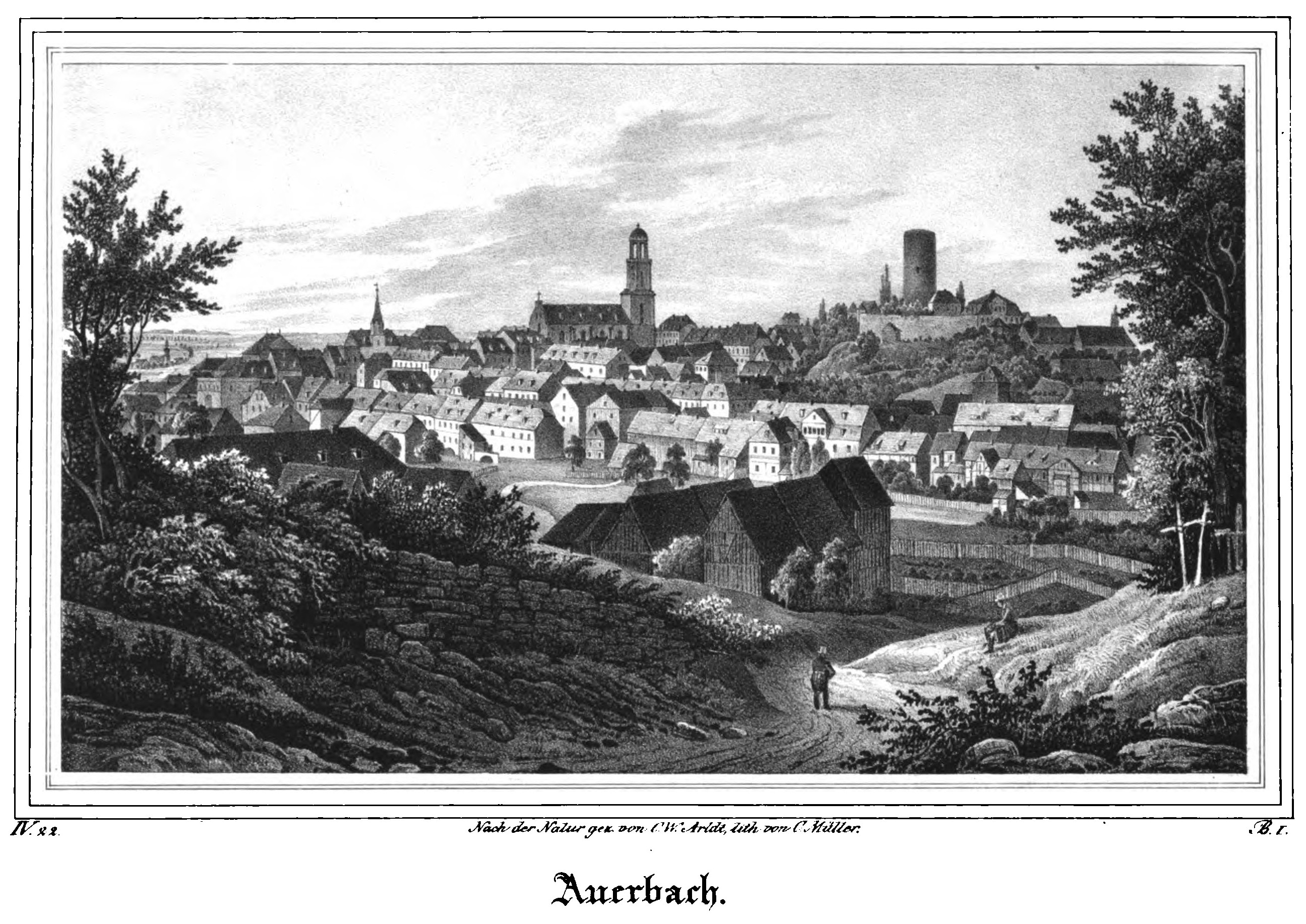
Auerbach, lithographie from a drawing by Carl Wilhelm Arldt, 1839
