= Western Ore Mountains =

Natural region of Germany

Coordinates: 50.4°N 12.5°E

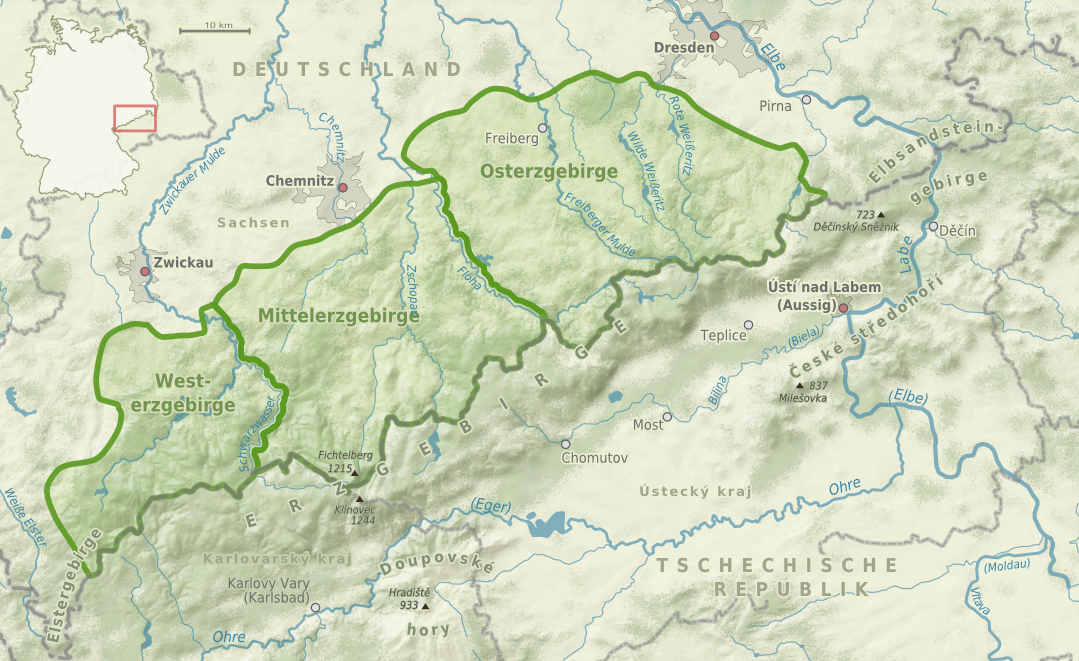
Map of natural regions in the Ore Mountains

The Western Ore Mountains (German: Westerzgebirge) is a natural region that forms the westernmost part of the Ore Mountains in the German state of Saxony. It is also part of the major landscape unit known as the Saxon Highlands and Uplands. It extends eastwards to include the valley of the Schwarzwasser, and, below its mouth, that of the Zwickauer Mulde, and incorporates the western parts of the former major units known as the Lower and Upper Western Ore Mountains (Unteres und Oberes Westerzgebirge), no. 423, as well as the Southern Slopes of the Ore Mountains (Südabdachung des Erzgebirges), no. 420.

In the current classification system of natural regions, the Western Ore Mountains only covers the western part of the region that bore the same name in the preceding system, whilst the eastern part of that region is now part of the Central Ore Mountains.

The higher regions of the Western Ore Mountains are part of the Ore Mountains/Vogtland Nature Park.

== Geography ==
The Western Ore Mountains transition gradually towards the (south)west into the "historic" Vogtland region and include several of its villages, whilst the official boundary with the natural region of Vogtland largely follows the watershed between the rivers of the Zwickauer Mulde and, in the extreme south, the Svatava, with the Vogtland river of the White Elster, the central and southern part of this boundary lying somewhat to the east, so that the source regions of the eastern Elster tributaries are still counted as being in the Ore Mountains. The Vysoký kámen (Hoher Stein) near Erlbach is the southernmost mountain of the Ore Mountain range.

To the north the Western Ore Mountains descend to the gently rolling Ore Mountain Basin and the town of Zwickau, whilst the mountain range continues to the south on the far side of the border with the Czech Republic. The state border largely follows the ridgeline of the mountains, which continues southwest on both sides of the border into the Elster Mountains and the natural region of Vogtland. The 805 m high Hoher Brand, which is generally accepted as being in the Elster Mountains range, because it is located southwest of the Svatava, officially belongs to the natural region of the Western Ore Mountains.

In the south is the highest point on Saxon soil, the Auersberg (1019 m NN), northwest of Johanngeorgenstadt. It is overlooked by the 1,043 m high Blatenský vrch (Plattenberg) southeast of the town and on the other side of the international border.

== Settlements ==
The following list includes all the towns and municipalities that lie wholly or partly within the Western Ore Mountains. Places that belong to the historic Vogtland, are marked with an asterisk (*).

- Aue (centre and west)
- Auerbach* (only the sparsely populated southeastern half)
- Bad Schlema
- Bockau
- Breitenbrunn (northwestern part of the municipality)
- Crinitzberg
- Eibenstock
- Ellefeld* (only the southeast)
- Erlbach* (only the northeastern half)
- Falkenstein* (only the unpopulated southeastern tip)
- Grünbach*
- Hammerbrücke*
- Hartmannsdorf bei Kirchberg
- Hartenstein (apart from the unsettled east and the extreme northwest)
- Hirschfeld
- Johanngeorgenstadt
- Kirchberg (apart from the extreme southwest)
- Klingenthal*
- Langenweißbach
- Lauter
- Lengenfeld* (only the extreme northeast)
- Lichtentanne (only the extreme southeast)
- Markneukirchen* (only the unsettled, extreme northeast tip)
- Morgenröthe-Rautenkranz
- Neustadt* (only the unsettled south(east))
- Oelsnitz/Erzgeb. (only the southeast)
- Rodewisch* (only the unsettled southeast)
- Schneeberg
- Schöneck* (apart from a narrow, unsettled strip on the western slope)
- Schönheide
- Schwarzenberg (centre and west)
- Sosa
- Stützengrün
- Steinberg* (apart from the extreme northwest)
- Tannenbergsthal*
- Werda* (only the southeast half)
- Wildenfels (apart from the north)
- Wilkau-Haßlau (only the extreme south)
- Zschorlau
- Zwickau (only the extreme south)
- Zwota*

Following the redrawing of the boundaries by the Saxon State Office, parts of Zwickau and Wilkau-Haßlau also lie within the Western Ore Mountains.

== See also ==
- Eastern Ore Mountains
- List of mountains in Saxony
- List of regions of Saxony

== Sources ==
- BfN
  - Map services
  - Landscape fact files
    - Southern Slopes of the Ore Mountains
    - Higher regions on the northern slopes of the Western and Central Ore Mountains
    - Lower regions of the Western Ore Mountains
