= Trieb =

River in Germany

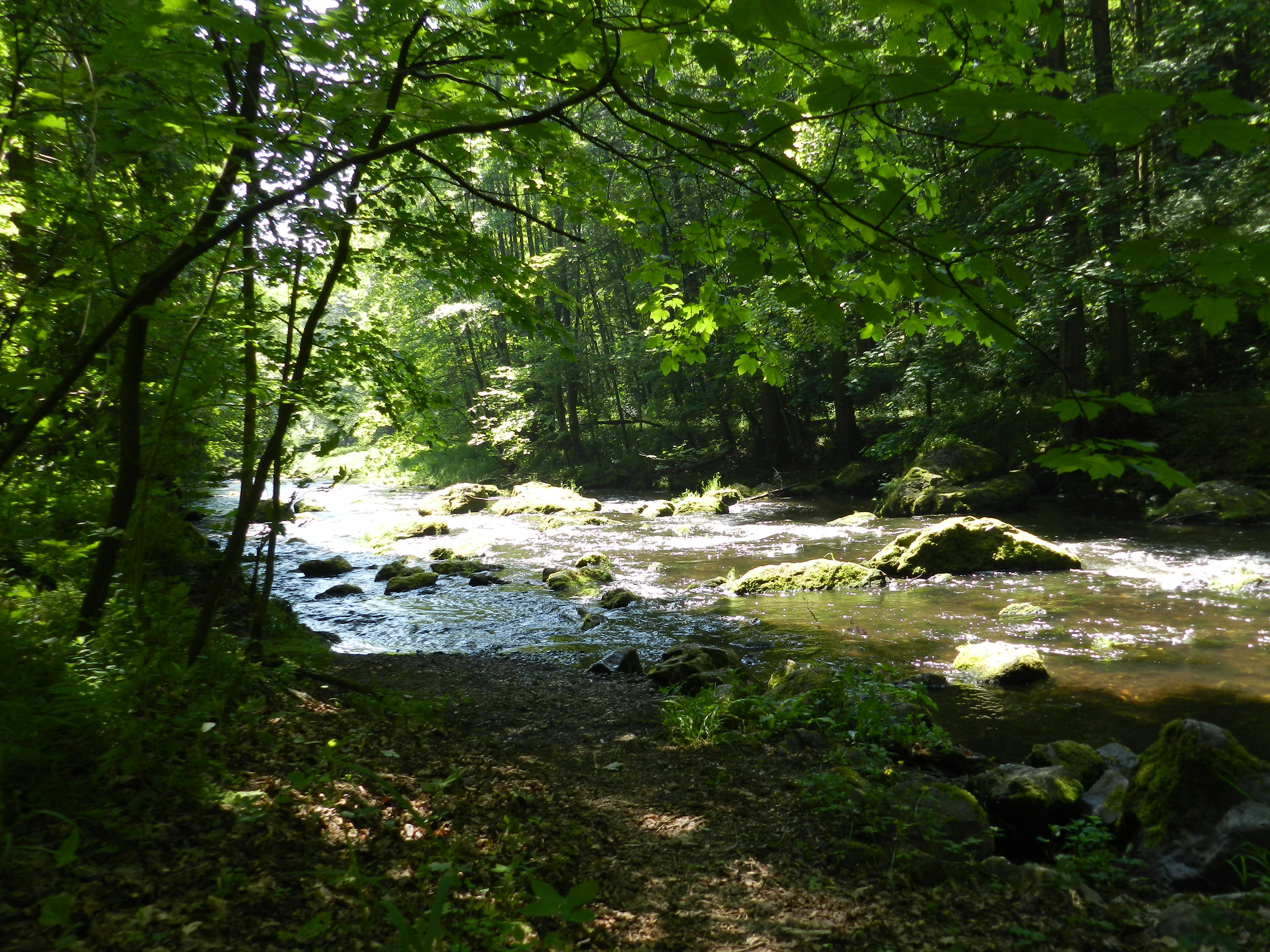

Location
- Country: Germany
- State: Saxony
- District: Vogtlandkreis
- Reference no.: DE: 56618

Physical characteristics
- Source
  - location: north of Schöneck/Vogtl.
  - coordinates: 50°24′33″N 12°20′49″E
  - elevation: 770 m above sea level (NN)
- Mouth
  - location: White Elster
  - coordinates: 50°33′07″N 12°10′07″E
  - elevation: 331 m above sea level (NN)
- Length: 20 km (12 mi)
- Discharge
  - location: at Hasenmühle gauge
  - average: 0.959 m^{3}/s (33.9 cu ft/s)
  - minimum: Record low: 0.020 m^{3}/s (0.71 cu ft/s) (in 08.08.1979); Average low: 0.146 m^{3}/s (5.2 cu ft/s)
  - maximum: Average high: 13.8 m^{3}/s (490 cu ft/s); Record high: 49.2 m^{3}/s (1,740 cu ft/s) (in 01.09.1995)

Basin features
- Progression: White Elster→ Saale→ Elbe→ North Sea
- Landmarks: Villages: Bergen/V.
- Tributaries
  - right: Treba
- Waterbodies: Reservoirs: Werda Reservoir, Pöhl Reservoir

The Trieb is a river of Saxony, Germany and a right-hand tributary of the White Elster.

== See also ==
- List of rivers of Saxony
