= Azur (satellite) =

West Germany's first scientific satellite

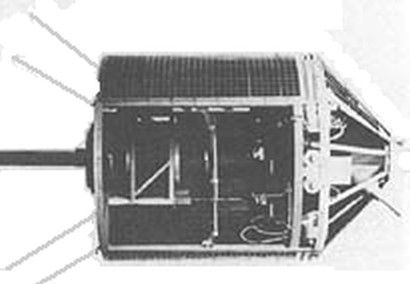
- Operator: BMWF/DLR
- COSPAR ID: 1969-097A
- SATCAT no.: 4221
- Mission duration: 7 months, 20 days (achieved); 56 years, 9 months, 24 days (in orbit)

Spacecraft properties
- Manufacturer: BMWF/NASA
- Launch mass: 71 kilograms (157 lb)

Start of mission
- Launch date: 8 November 1969, 01:52 UTC
- Rocket: Scout B S169C
- Launch site: Vandenberg SLC-5

End of mission
- Last contact: 29 June 1970

Orbital parameters
- Reference system: Geocentric
- Regime: Medium Earth; Decayed into Low Earth
- Periapsis altitude: 368 kilometres (229 mi)
- Apoapsis altitude: 1,445 kilometres (898 mi)
- Inclination: 102.70 degrees
- Period: 102.99 minutes
- Epoch: 6 December 2013, 12:36:47 UTC

Azur (also called GRS-A) was West Germany's first scientific satellite. Launched on 8 November 1969 it studied the Van Allen belts, solar particles, and aurorae.

The construction of the satellite was carried out by Ludwig Bölkow, one of the aeronautical pioneers of Germany, and with the participation of other German companies.

An engineering model of the Azur-satellite is exhibited in the German Space Travel Exhibition in Morgenröthe-Rautenkranz.
