= Neue Perspektive Vogtland =

Neue Perspektive Vogtland Neue Perspektive Vogtland
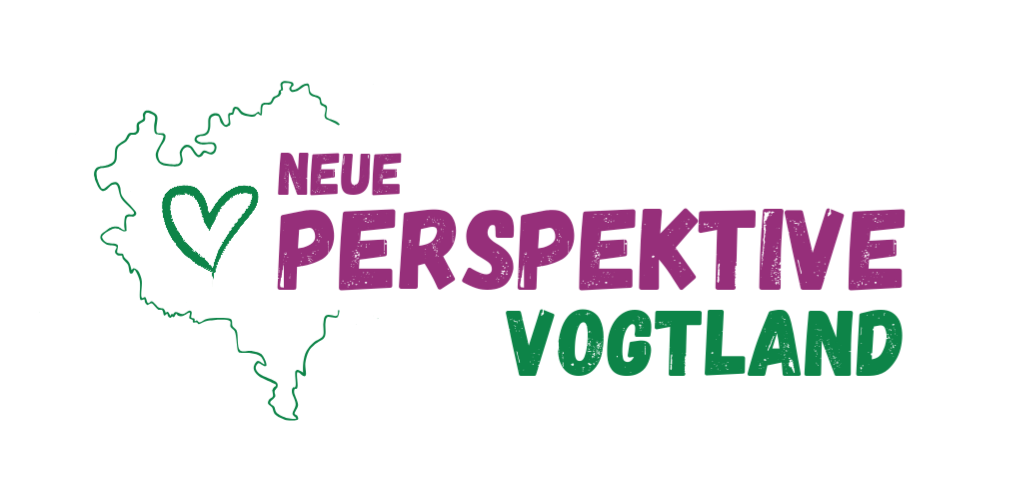
- Abbreviation: PERSPEKTIVE
- Chief executive: David Drechsel
- Deputy Chief executive: Thomas Hohl, Dietmar Eichhorn
- Speaker in the district council: Gunnar Gemeinhardt
- Founded: 11 December 2023; 21 months ago
- Headquarters: Plauen, Muldenhammer
- Newspaper: MEHR PERSPEKTIVE
- Membership (2025): 33
- Ideology: Localism; Direct democracy
- Political position: center
- Kreistagsfraktion: FDP/Perspektive
- Colours: purple green
- Slogan: "Parteiunabhängig. Dem Vogtland verpflichtet." (2024)
- County council Vogtlandkreis: 2 / 86
- Municipal councils Vogtlandkreis: 4 / 570

Website
- neue-perspektive-vogtland.de

Neue Perspektive Vogtland is a non-partisan grouping of electors in the Vogtlandkreis, Saxony. It was founded in December 2023 as an electoral alliance with a view to the 2024 local elections and has been represented in the Vogtlandkreis district council since then, as well as in town and municipal councils via local alliances. The group forms a joint district council parliamentary group with the FDP.

== History ==
The grouping of electors was founded on 11 December 2023. It ran for the first time in the 2024 local elections in the Vogtlandkreis, in which it achieved a result of 2.1% and thus won two seats in the county council.

Some candidates were already active in local politics before 2024. For example, Manja Tröger, who was elected to the county council for the Greens in 2019, and Gunnar Gemeinhardt, who received over 20% in the 2015 district council election as an independent.

=== Mandates ===
After the 2024 local elections, the grouping of electors will be represented with two seats in the Vogtlandkreis district council. The elected representatives are Gunnar Gemeinhardt and Michael Kober. In addition, other supporters of the grouping of electors were elected to city and local councils via local electoral lists, including Thomas Hohl (Pausa-Mühltroff local council), David Drechsel (Muldenhammer local council), Yvonne Gruber (Plauen city council) and Ingo Eckhardt (Plauen city council).

== Electoral performance ==
=== Vogtlandkreis County Council ===
In the 2024 district elections in the Vogtland district, the grouping of electors stood 15 candidates and entered the Vogtland district council with two representatives. Since 2024, it has formed a parliamentary group with the FDP, which lost its parliamentary group status in the district elections.

Vogtlandkreis County council
Election	Vote	%	Score	Seats	+/–	Leader	Status
2024	6,913	2.1	9th	2 / 86	▲2	collective leadership	Opposition

=== Vogtlandkreis Municipal councils ===
The grouping of electors stood for the 2024 local elections in the Vogtland district with five candidates on local electoral lists. Four of these candidates were elected to city and municipal councils.

Vogtlandkreis Municipal councils
Election	Vote	%	Score	Seats	+/–	Leader	Status
2024	2,484	0.8	-	4 / 570	▲4	collective leadership	Opposition
2024	Part of local lists, which won 8 seats in total						
