= Wilhelm Bachner =

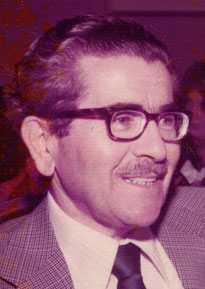
- Born: 1912
- Died: 1991 (aged 78–79)
- Occupation: Engineer

Wilhelm Bachner (1912–1991) was an engineer and Holocaust survivor who saved the lives of more than fifty Jews during World War II.

While residing within the Warsaw Ghetto, Bachner hid his Jewish identity and took a job as an engineer in a German construction company. He used his connections to freely access the ghetto and assist his family and friends.

As the construction company gained more military contracts, Bachner hired other Jews, helped them conceal their identities, and got his family and others out of ghettos and concentration camps.

Most of the people he helped survived The Holocaust.

== Early life and education ==
Wilhelm Bachner was born in 1912 in Bielsko-Biała, Poland to Heinrich Bachner and Helena Buchfuehrer Bachner. Prior to World War I, the town had been part of Austria. He had two sisters, Hilde and Anna, and a brother, Bruno.

Bachner studied engineering at a German university. He moved to Warsaw with his wife, Cesia, in 1939. The family was forced into the Warsaw Ghetto soon after their arrival.

== Rescue efforts ==
Kellner Construction Company and the Warsaw Ghetto

In late 1940, the Bachners were visited by their cousin, Annia Meyer. Meyer had hidden her Jewish identity and obtained a secretary position at a German construction company owned by Johannes Kellner. Meyer suggested that Bachner do the same citing his perfect German and his degree from a German university.

In January 1941, Bachner bribed a guard and left the ghetto by blending in with Jews with legal working papers. He removed the armband that identified him as a Jew and proceeded to the construction company's offices. Bachner was interviewed by Kellner and hired immediately. Kellner had temporarily moved to the area to work on military contracts for the Germans.

Projects

The first project Bachner worked on was barracks for the Luftwaffe near the Warsaw airport. He was told to coordinate the painting of the barracks, gather Polish workers, and source building supplies. Bachner suggested to Kellner that it may be cheaper to acquire bricks and construction materials from demolished buildings in the Warsaw Ghetto. Kellner approved the request and Bachner was given papers that allowed him to enter and exit the Warsaw Ghetto freely. At the end of each day, Bachner entered the ghetto, put on his armband, and returned to his family home on Sliska Street. He often brought the family food and other necessities that were difficult to acquire in the ghetto.

The project at the Warsaw airport was completed in February 1941. Kellner had initially planned to return to his offices in Dresden, Germany. Fearing that this was the end of his scheme, Bachner convinced Kellner to stay in Warsaw and establish a construction firm there. Bachner promised to handle operations and manage German contracts. Kellner agreed and the construction company was declared to be crucial to Nazi war efforts which allowed them easier access to permits, supplies and workers. Bachner was the firm's supervisor.

The second contract received by the construction company was for the Luftwaffe airport in Bialystok, a town about fifty miles from Warsaw. Bachner supervised the project and lived on-site, but frequently returned to Warsaw.

Bachner's cousin resigned from her secretary position at the firm in spring 1941. Bachner suggested hiring two people to replace her citing the increased workload. Kellner approved the request and Bachner hired two Jewish men that lived outside the Warsaw ghetto. Like Bachner, the men were also hiding the fact that they were Jewish. One of the men, an accountant named Adolph Stamberger, was married to a German Christian and was living under the name Andrzej Staniecki. The other man was Stamberger's son-in-law, Julek Schwalbe, who was using the name Juljusz Stroynowski.

After the Nazis took Ukraine from the Soviets in summer 1941, the Kellner construction company was subcontracted to build Luftwaffe facilities in the Ukrainian town of Berdichev, a town in which most Jews had been deported, killed or forced into slave labor. The project was completed by winter 1941 and Bachner returned to Warsaw.

Bachner soon returned to Ukraine again to oversee a project at Kiev. On the way there, his train stopped in Lwow, Poland where Jewish slave laborers from Janowska concentration camp were working nearby. Bachner recognized his uncle Fabish working among them, though he did not approach him. Bachner later returned to the work site and where he told the SS officer in charge that the man was a skilled carpenter who was needed on other projects, but the officers refused to release him. Bachner hired a driver, returned at night and snuck his uncle out of the rail yard where the slave laborers were working. Bachner brought Fabish back to Kiev and made him a foreman on the Kiev project.

In summer 1942 Julek Schwalbe came to Kiev to share news of the deportation and murders of Jews from the Warsaw Ghetto. Bachner departed Kiev for Warsaw on 28 July 1942. Bachner's brother, Bruno, was deported from the ghetto the same summer, even though he had working papers. Bachner's mother committed suicide soon after.

Bachner created fake working papers for his father, wife, cousins, and others connected to his Jewish workers with the goal of getting them out of the ghetto before they were deported to concentration camps. With their papers, they were able to leave the ghetto and join Bachner in Ukraine. Bachner integrated them into his workforce, continued to assist them in concealing their identities, and housed some in a safe house in Kiev. Bachner presented his wife, Cesia, as his Polish mistress.

In autumn 1943, as the Soviets advanced through Ukraine, the Kellner construction company's Kiev offices closed and employees began retreating westward in a train car workshop known as a Bauzug. Some Ukrainian and Jewish workers stayed behind while Bachner's crew went on to Poland.

In May 1944 Kellner visited Bachner at a worksite in Bromberg, Poland and told him to fire some employees, including Bachner's father who had been using the last name Godewski. Fearing the loss of his father, Bachner admitted to Kellner that the man was his father and that both he and his father were Jewish. Kellner did not turn them in, but stated that he would not help them or any other Jewish members of the crew if they were found out.

Liberation

The Bauzug and the remaining crew arrived in Germany in October 1944 and continued moving to various German project sites while avoiding Allied bombing campaigns. The train was split into two in April 1945 with Bachner's cars going to Muldenburg and the other cars going to Plauen. When Muldenburg was liberated by the Americans, Bachner presented himself to the Americans. He was initially stopped by an American MP, but was able to share in limited English that he was Jewish. The MP revealed that he was Jewish as well and Bachner recited the Shema prayer to him. The Jewish members of the crew from both parts of the Bauzug were reunited at a displaced persons camp in Oelsnitz.

=== Post war ===
The Bachners returned to Bielsko, Poland where they reunited with Wilhelm's surviving sister, Hilde. His sister, Anne, and brother, Bruno, has been murdered by the Nazis. They soon left Poland due to restrictive Communist rule and antisemitism. They briefly lived in West Bramberg, Germany before immigrating to America in 1951.

Wilhelm and Cesia Bachner settled in Oakland, California. The couple had no children due to a wartime abortion that left Cesia sterile. Bachner worked as an engineer in the San Francisco Bay area.

== Death and legacy ==
Bachner saved more than fifty Jews during The Holocaust. He stayed in touch with many of them after the war.

Bachner died in 1991, four months after Cesia.
