= Leubnitz =

Village in Vogtlandkreis district, Germany

- Ortsteil of Rosenbach
- Interactive map of Leubnitz
- Location within Germany Location within Saxony
- Coordinates: 50°31′0″N 12°1′40″E
- Country: Germany
- State: Saxony
- District: Vogtlandkreis
- Municipality: Rosenbach

Area
  - Total: 29.64 km^{2} (11.44 sq mi)
- Elevation: 299 m (981 ft)

Population (2009-12-31)
  - Total: 1,414
  - Density: 47.71/km^{2} (123.6/sq mi)
- Time zone: UTC+01:00 (CET)
  - Summer (DST): UTC+02:00 (CEST)
- Postal codes: 08539
- Dialling codes: 037431
- Vehicle registration: V
- Website: www.leubnitz.de

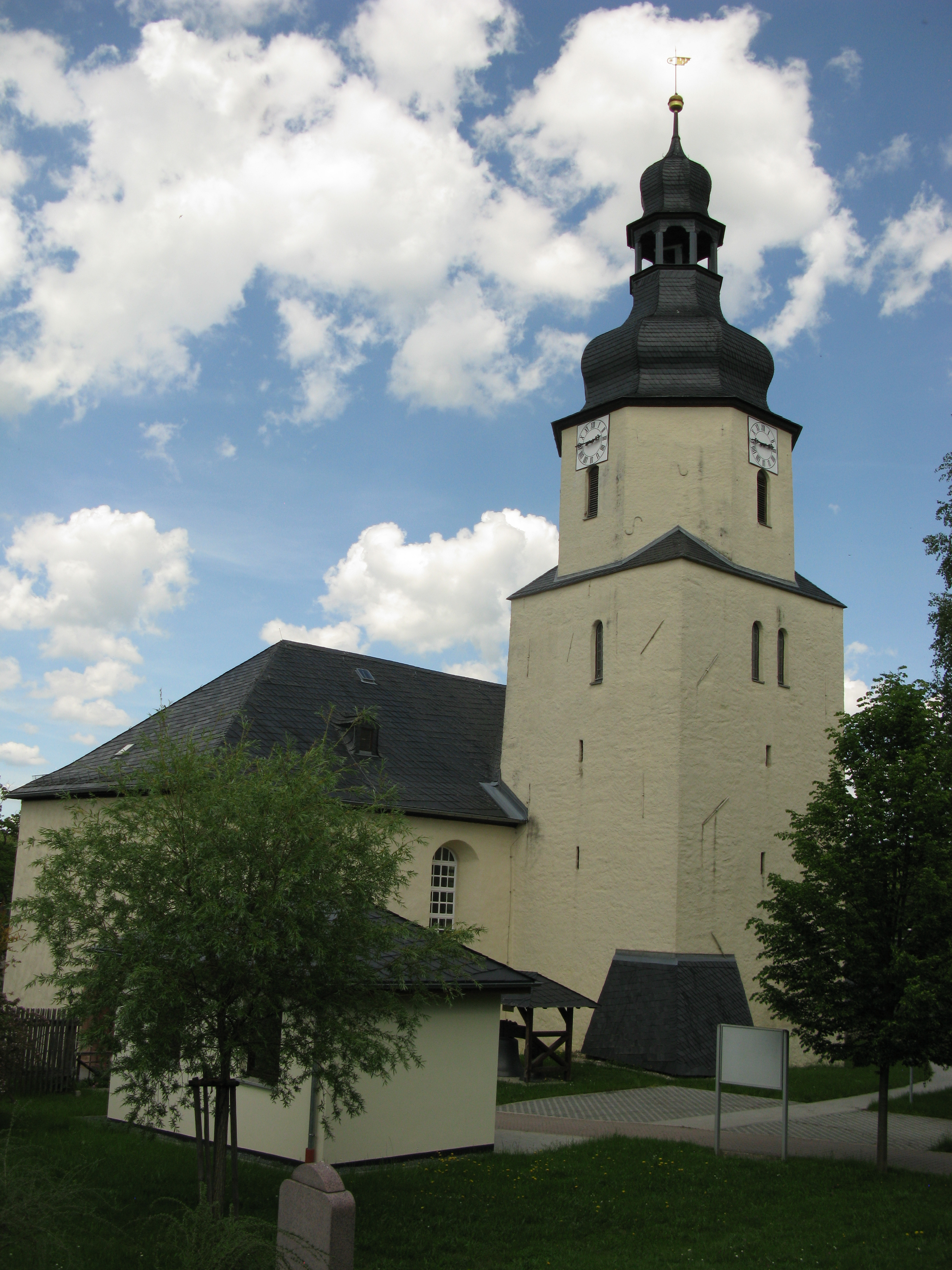
St. Mary’s church in Leubnitz

Leubnitz is a village and a former municipality in the Vogtlandkreis district, in Saxony, Germany. Since 1 January 2011, it is part of the municipality Rosenbach.
