= Syrau =

- Ortsteil of Rosenbach
- Interactive map of Syrau
- Location within Germany Location within Saxony
- Coordinates: 50°32′35″N 12°4′34″E
- Country: Germany
- State: Saxony
- District: Vogtlandkreis
- Municipality: Rosenbach

Area
  - Total: 15.66 km^{2} (6.05 sq mi)
- Elevation: 443 m (1,453 ft)

Population (2009-12-31)
  - Total: 1,584
  - Density: 101.1/km^{2} (262.0/sq mi)
- Time zone: UTC+01:00 (CET)
  - Summer (DST): UTC+02:00 (CEST)
- Postal codes: 08548
- Dialling codes: 037431
- Vehicle registration: V
- Website: www.syrau.de

Syrau is a village and a former municipality in the Vogtlandkreis district, in Saxony, Germany. Since 1 January 2011, it is part of the municipality Rosenbach.
