= Central Ore Mountains =

Coordinates: 50.6°N 13.0°E

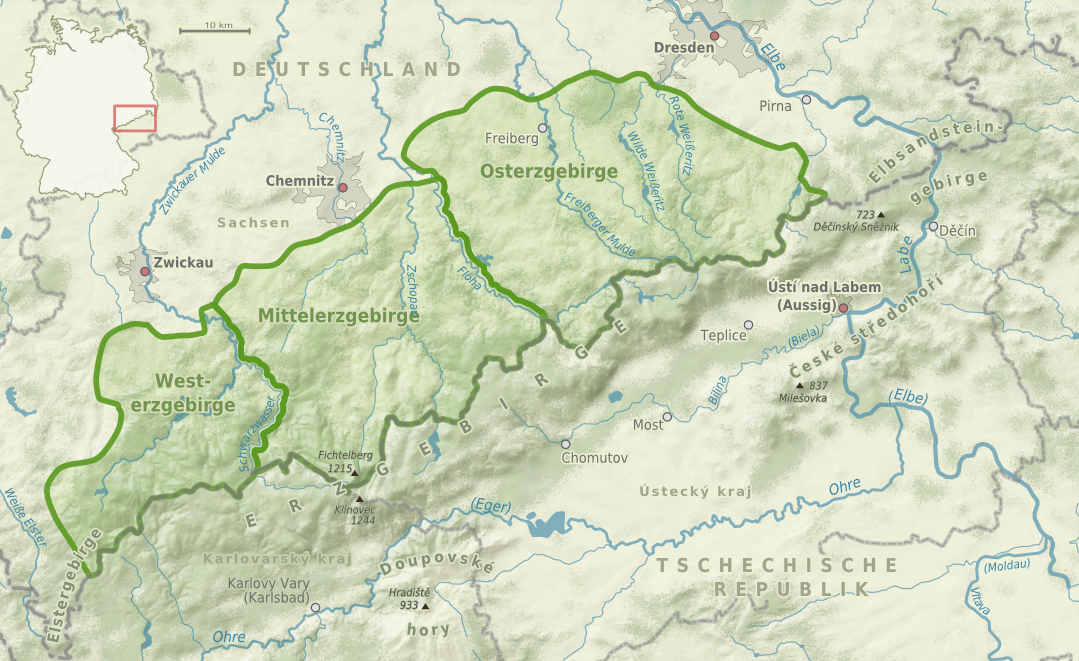
Map of natural regions in the Ore Mountains

The Central or Middle Ore Mountains (German: Mittlere Erzgebirge or Mittelerzgebirge) is a natural region that forms the central-western part of the Ore Mountains in the German federal state of Saxony. It is part of the overarching unit, the Saxon Highlands and Uplands. It forms the eastern part of the former major units, the Lower Western Ore Mountains (Unteres Westerzgebirge, 423) and Upper Western Ore Mountains (Oberes Westerzgebirge, 421) and is separated from the Eastern Ore Mountains in the east by the (included) valley of the Flöha, and from the Western Ore Mountains in the west by the (excluded) valley of the Schwarzwasser and, below its mouth, by the Zwickauer Mulde.

The upper regions of the Central Ore Mountains are part of the Ore Mountains/Vogtland Nature Park.

== See also ==
- Western Ore Mountains
- Eastern Ore Mountains
- List of mountains in the Ore Mountains
- List of mountains in Saxony

== Sources ==
- Federal Agency for Nature Conservation (BfN)
  - Map services
  - Landscape fact files
    - Upper regions on the northern slopes of the Western and Central Ore Mountains
    - Lower regions of the Central Ore Mountains
