= Zaulsdorf =

- Ortsteil of Mühlental
- Interactive map of Zaulsdorf
- Location within Germany Location within Saxony
- Coordinates: 50°25′13″N 12°13′53″E
- Country: Germany
- State: Saxony
- District: Vogtlandkreis
- Municipality: Mühlental

Area
  - Total: 1 km^{2} (0.39 sq mi)
- Time zone: UTC+01:00 (CET)
  - Summer (DST): UTC+02:00 (CEST)

Zaulsdorf is a small village in the Vogtlandkreis district, in Saxony, Germany. It is situated 5 kilometres (3.1 mi) east of Oelsnitz. It is part of the municipality Mühlental.

== Geography ==
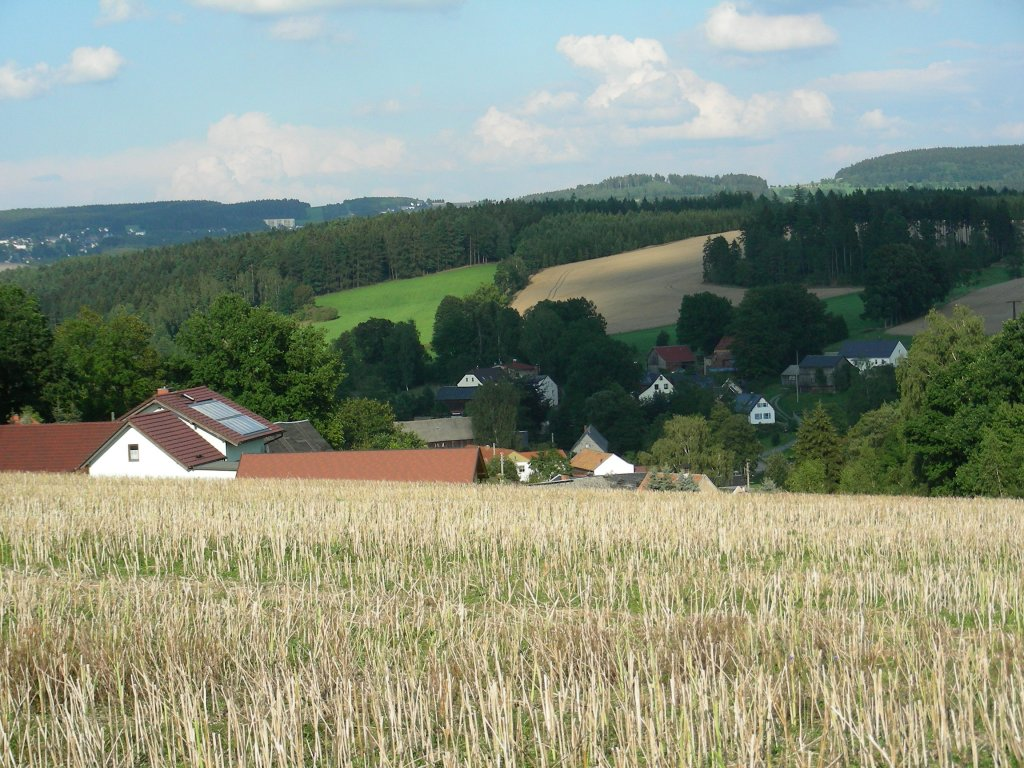
Zaulsdorf from the West

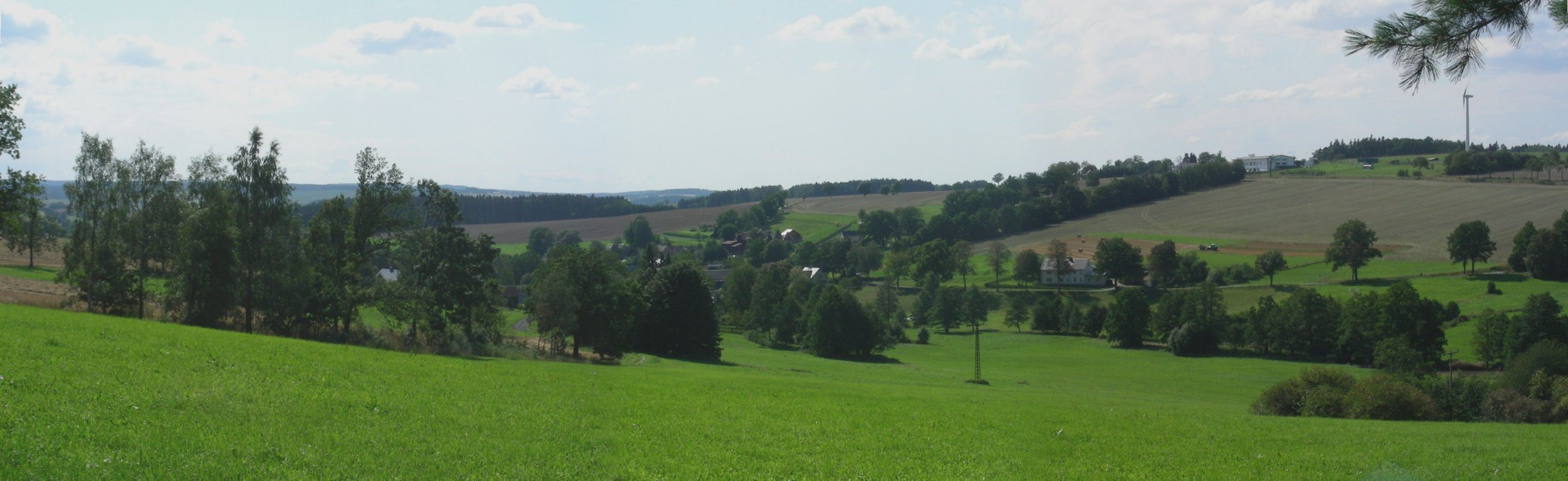
Zaulsdorf from the East

The village of Zaulsdorf lies in a valley approximately 460 metres (1,510 ft) above sea level. The ground rolls and rises to the mountains which are approximately 900 metres (3,000 ft).

The village of Zaulsdorf is accessed by taking the L303 highway to the east out of Oelsnitz. Zaulsdorf is on the right about 5 kilometres (3.1 mi) away from Oelsnitz.

== History ==
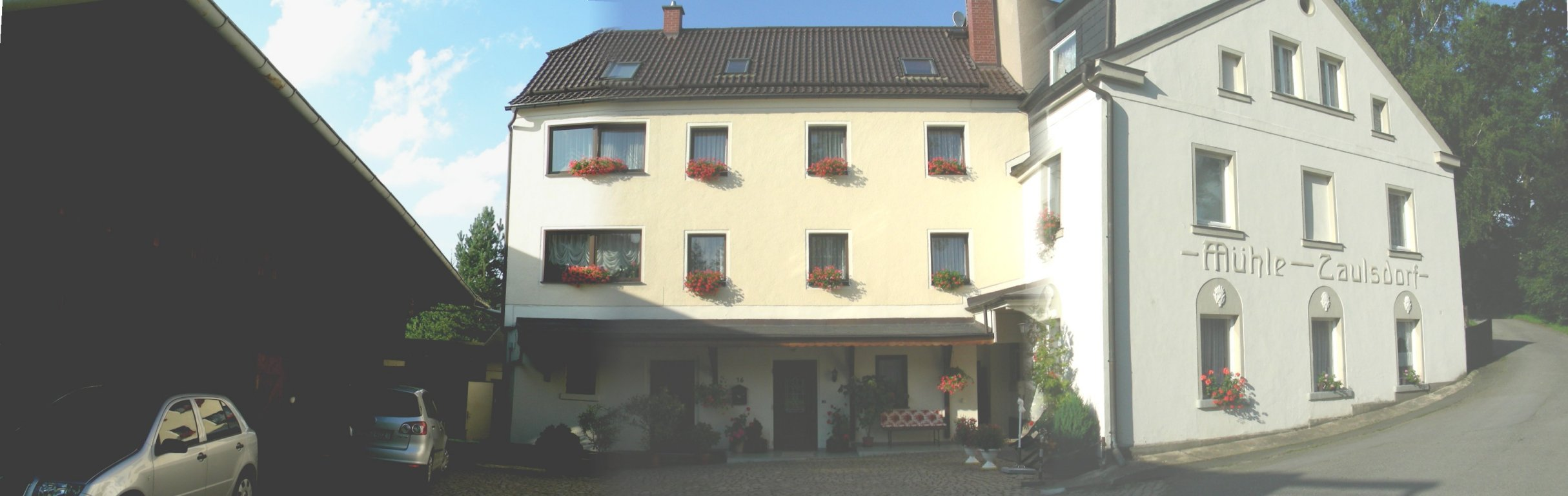
Zaulsdorf old mill from the South

The Zaulsdorf Mill is a central focus of the village. Prior to 1902, the Zaulsdorf Mill was owned by the Leucht family. Since then, the mill has been owned by the Halbauer family.

The mill hasn't worked since 1986 and has been turned into apartments.
