= Treba =

Treba may refer to:

- Latin name of present Trevi nel Lazio, town and former bishopric, now a Latin Catholic titular see
- Treba (river), right tributary of the Trieb in Saxony, Germany
