= Treba (river) =

River in Saxony, Germany

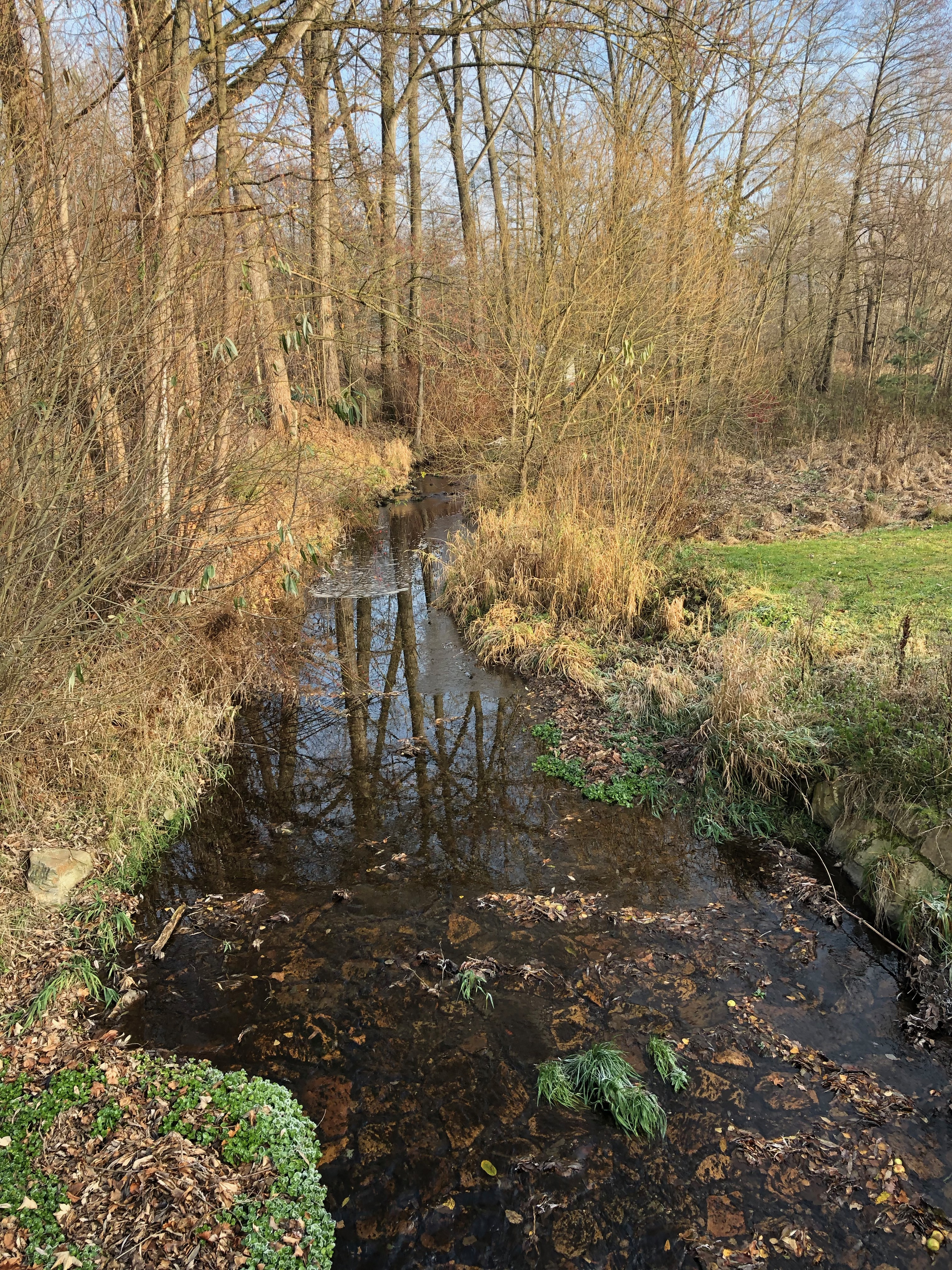
- Treba in Treuen

Location
- Country: Germany
- State: Saxony
- Reference no.: DE: SN5-6-618-4

Physical characteristics
- Source
  - location: near Neustadt
  - coordinates: 50.5247°N 12.2869°E
  - elevation: 634 m above sea level (NN)
- Mouth
  - location: into the Trieb (as Treuener Wasser)
  - coordinates: 50°31′29″N 12°17′12″E
  - elevation: 388 m above sea level (NN)
- Length: 15 km (9.3 mi)

Basin features
- Progression: Trieb→ White Elster→ Saale→ Elbe→ North Sea
- Landmarks: Small towns: Treuen

The Treba (in its lower course Treuener Wasser) is a river of Saxony, Germany.

The Treba's source is near Neustadt. Southeast of Treuen, the Treba unites with the Lämmelsbach and is then called Treuener Wasser. The Treuener Wasser empties from the right into the Trieb between the town of Treuen and the Thoßfell Predam.

There is a gauging station for a stream gauge (OBF51650) and this lies within Special Area of Conservation 5439-301 "Oberes Göltzschtal", which is a protected area and part of the Ore Mountains/Vogtland Nature Park.

== See also ==
- List of rivers of Saxony
