= Mehltheuer =

- Ortsteil of Rosenbach
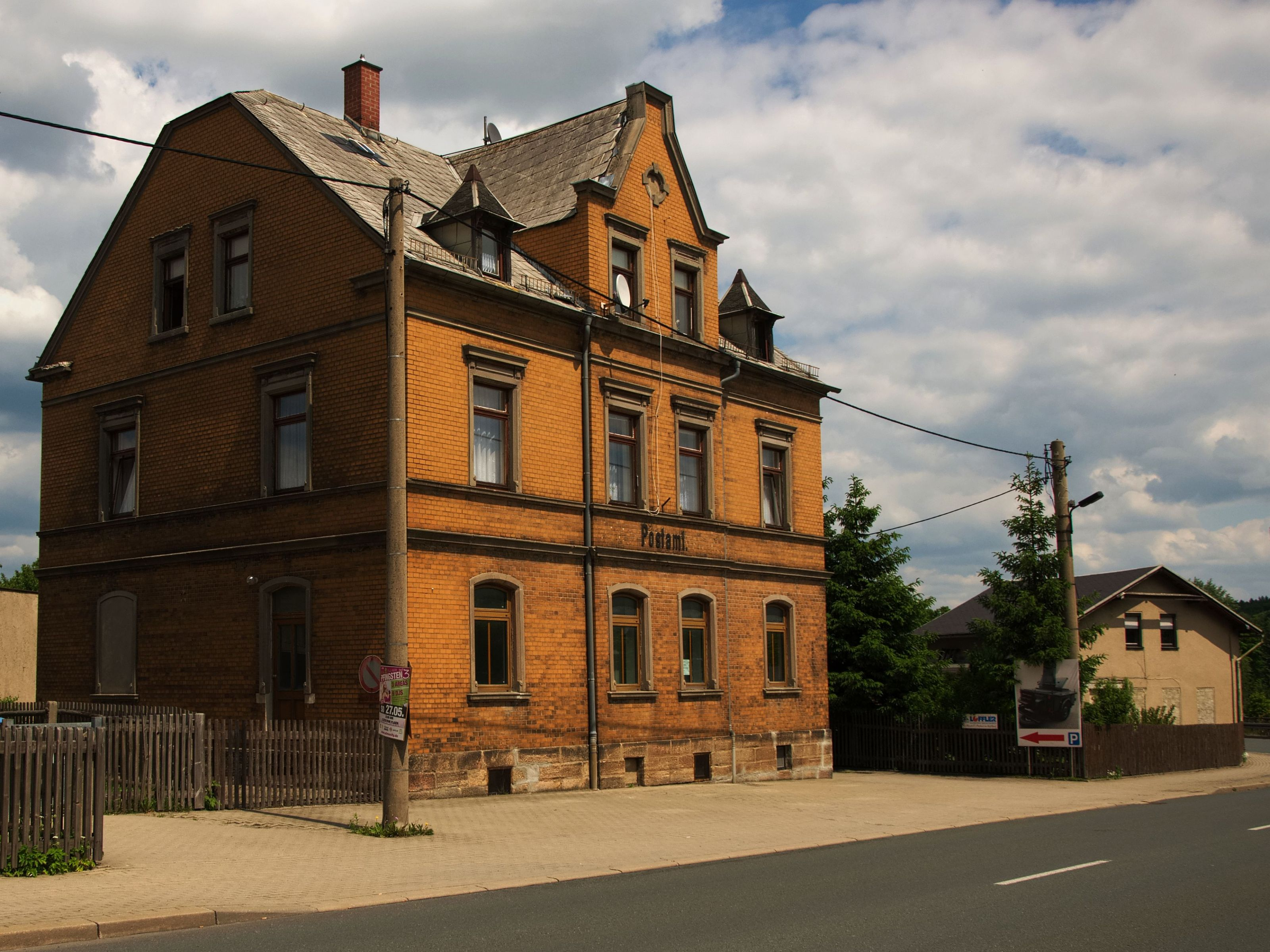
- Post office in Mehltheuer
- Interactive map of Mehltheuer
- Location within Germany Location within Saxony
- Coordinates: 50°32′40″N 12°2′20″E
- Country: Germany
- State: Saxony
- District: Vogtlandkreis
- Municipality: Rosenbach

Area
  - Total: 22.09 km^{2} (8.53 sq mi)
- Elevation: 512 m (1,680 ft)

Population (2009-12-31)
  - Total: 1,478
  - Density: 66.91/km^{2} (173.3/sq mi)
- Time zone: UTC+01:00 (CET)
  - Summer (DST): UTC+02:00 (CEST)
- Postal codes: 08539
- Dialling codes: 037431
- Vehicle registration: V
- Website: www.mehltheuer.de

Mehltheuer is a village and a former municipality in the Vogtlandkreis district, in Saxony, Germany. Since 1 January 2011, it is part of the municipality Rosenbach.

During World War II, Germany operated a subcamp of the Flossenbürg concentration camp in the village, in which over 300 Jewish women from German-occupied Poland and Hungary were imprisoned as forced labour. The prisoners were liberated by American troops in 1945.

There is a train station in the village.
