= Saxon Highlands and Uplands =

Coordinates: 51.0000°N 13.0000°E

- Native name: Sächsisches Bergland und Mittelgebirge
- Classification: Natural regions of the Free State of Saxony
- Natural region: Saxon Highlands and Uplands
- State(s): Saxony
- Country: Germany

The Saxon Highlands and Uplands (German: Sächsisches Bergland und Mittelgebirge) refer to a natural region mainly in the south of Saxony with small elements also in southeast Thuringia and northeast Bavaria. It comprises, from (south)west to (north)east, of the Vogtland, the Ore Mountains, Saxon Switzerland, the Upper Lusatian Plateau and the Zittau Hills.

The amalgamation of several major geographical units by the working group for Ecological balance and Regional Character at the Saxon Academy of Sciences in Leipzig, that includes a break-up of the old natural region of Oberlausitz, has not been fully recognised officially, because this division has not yet been accepted by federal authorities like the Bundesamt für Naturschutz (BfN), but does broadly follow the logic of other groupings such as that of the Thuringian-Franconian Upland which border it to the west and includes the Thuringian Forest, Thuringian Highland, Franconian Forest and Fichtel Mountains.

Whilst the Thuringian-Franconian Upland, like the adjacent Upper Palatine-Bavarian Forest run from northwest to southeast, these low Saxon mountains generally run from west-southwest to east-northeast. The Vogtland, whose German section lies mainly in the natural region in the Free State of Saxony that gives it its name, forms the actual link to the Thuringian-Franconian Upland.

The new internal subdivisions of the Ore Mountains have since been adopted by the BfN.

== Natural sub-divisions ==
The following list shows the current division of natural regions. Main geographical units according to Meynen and the BfN are shown with an asterisk (*).

- Saxon Highlands and Uplands
  - 41 (=D17) Vogtland* (partly in Thuringia)
    - 410 East Thuringian-Vogtland Plateau
    - 411 Middle Vogtland Peak District
    - 412 Upper Vogtland
      - Elster Mountains
  - 42 (=D16) Ore Mountains*
    - Western Ore Mountains
    - Middle Ore Mountains
    - Eastern Ore Mountains
  - 43 (=D15) Saxon-Bohemian Chalk Sandstone Region*
    - 430 Saxon Switzerland
    - 431 Zittau Mountains (German part of the Lusatian Mountains which also stretch into the Czech Republic)
  - to 44 (=D14) Mountainous part of Upper Lusatia*
    - 441 Upper Lusatian Plateau

== Alternative sub-divisions according to Meynen and BfN ==
The older division of the Ore Mountains into major units by Meynen is as follows (in brackets their location within the new classification):

- 42 (=D16) Ore Mountains (Erzgebirge)
  - 420 Southern foothills of the Ore Mountains (extreme southwest of the Western Ore Mountains)
  - 421 Upper Western Ore Mountains (Western Ore Mountains apart from the extreme southwest and extreme northeast, southern part of the Middle Ore Mountains)
  - 422 Upper Eastern Ore Mountains (southern part of the Eastern Ore Mountains)
  - 423 Lower Western Ore Mountains (Extreme northeast of the Western Ore Mountains, north and centre of the Middle Ore Mountains)
  - 424 Lower Eastern Ore Mountains (North and centre of the Eastern Ore Mountains)

== See also ==
- Natural regions of Germany

== Sources ==
- Map of the natural regions in Saxony at www.umwelt.sachsen.de (pdf, 859 kB)
- BfN
  - Map services
  - Landscape fact files
    - Vogtland
      - Upper levels of the East Thuringian-Vogtland Plateau and the Middle Vogtland Peak District
      - Upper Saale Valley
      - Northern East Thuringian-Vogtland Plateau (excluding lake district)
      - Plothen Lake District
      - Ronneburg Arable and Mining Region (Northeastern East Thuringian-Vogtland Plateaus)
      - Lower levels of the Middle Vogtland Peak District
      - Intermediate levels of the Upper Vogtland
      - Lower levels of the Upper Vogtland
    - Ore Mountains
      - Southern foothills of the Ore Mountains
      - Upper levels of the northern foothills of the Western and Middle Ore Mountains
      - Lower levels of the Western Ore Mountains
      - Lower levels of the Middle Ore Mountains
      - Upper levels of the Eastern Ore Mountains
      - Lower levels of the Eastern Ore Mountains
      - Tharandt Forest (northern part of the Eastern Ore Mountains)
    - Kreidesandsteingebiet und Oberlausitz
      - Saxon Switzerland (excluding the Elbe Valley)
      - Upper Elbe Valley
      - Upper Lusatian Plateau
      - Zittau Hills
