= Tannenbergsthal =

- Ortsteil of Muldenhammer
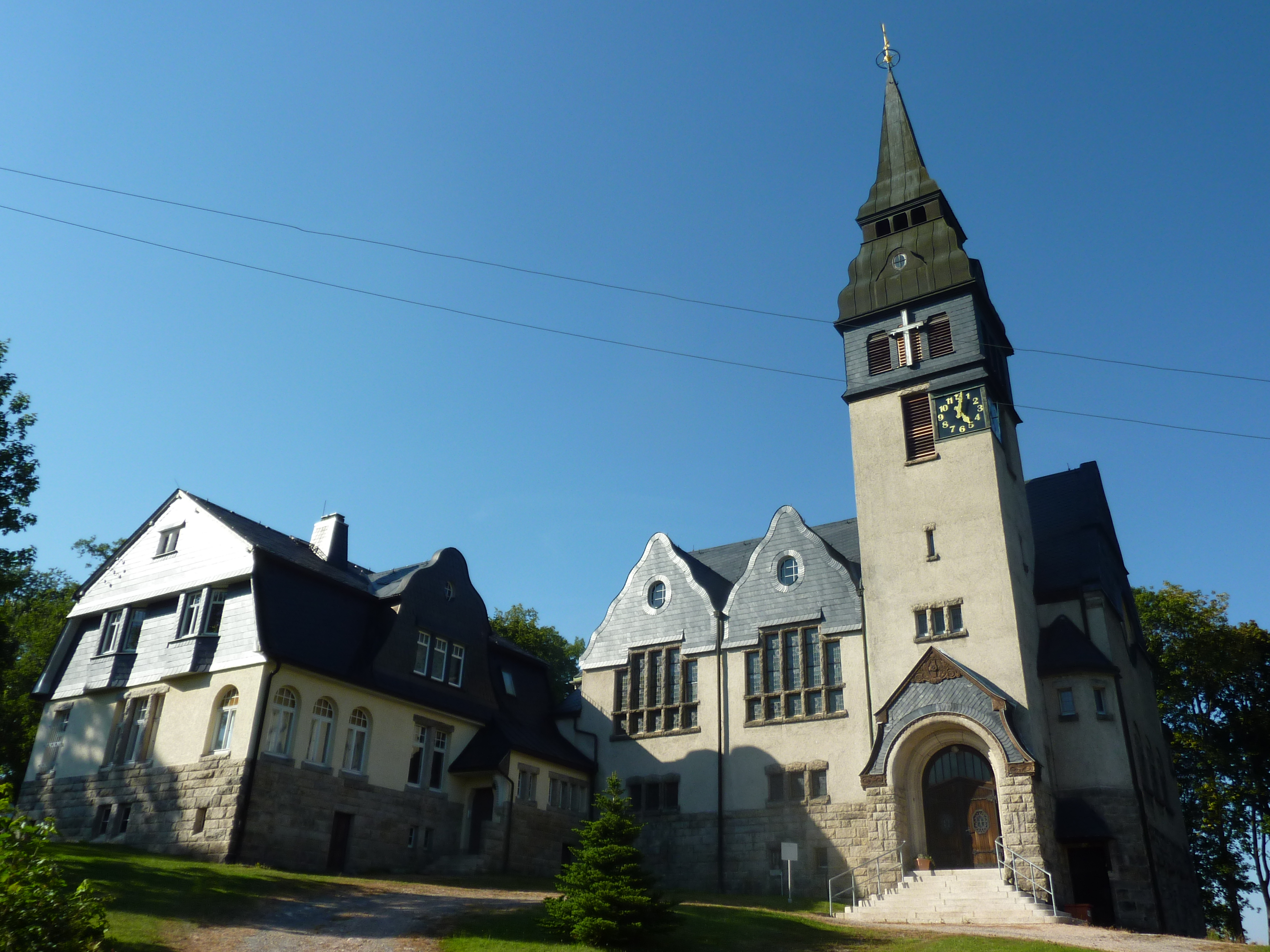
- Village church

- Coat of arms
- Interactive map of Tannenbergsthal
- Location within Germany Location within Saxony
- Coordinates: 50°26′N 12°28′E
- Country: Germany
- State: Saxony
- District: Vogtlandkreis
- Municipality: Muldenhammer

Area
  - Total: 17.92 km^{2} (6.92 sq mi)
- Elevation: 615 m (2,018 ft)

Population (2006-12-31)
  - Total: 1,501
  - Density: 83.76/km^{2} (216.9/sq mi)
- Time zone: UTC+01:00 (CET)
  - Summer (DST): UTC+02:00 (CEST)
- Postal codes: 08262
- Dialling codes: 037465
- Vehicle registration: V
- Website: www.tannenbergsthal.de

Tannenbergsthal is a village and a former municipality in the Vogtlandkreis district, in Saxony, Germany. Since 1 October 2009, along with Morgenröthe-Rautenkranz, it is part of the municipality Muldenhammer.

== Overview ==
Located in the western part of the Ore Mountains, it is also a part of the Vogtland.

The village counts Europe's only topaz rock and a nearby show mine. The Crown Jewels of the United Kingdom contain Tannenbergsthal topazes.
