= Jägerswald =

- Verwaltungsverband
- Location of Jägerswald within Vogtlandkreis district
- Interactive map of Jägerswald
- Location within Germany Location within Saxony
- Coordinates: 50°26′N 12°15′E
- Country: Germany
- State: Saxony
- District: Vogtlandkreis
- Seat: Tirpersdorf
- Subdivisions: 4 municipalities

Area
  - Total: 51.44 km^{2} (19.86 sq mi)

Population (2025-12-31)
  - Total: 4,618
  - Density: 89.77/km^{2} (232.5/sq mi)
- Time zone: UTC+01:00 (CET)
  - Summer (DST): UTC+02:00 (CEST)
- Website: www.jaegerswald.de

Jägerswald is a Verwaltungsverband in the district Vogtlandkreis in Saxony, Germany. The seat of the Verwaltungsverband is in Tirpersdorf.

The Verwaltungsverband Jägerswald consists of the following municipalities:

1. Bergen
2. Theuma
3. Tirpersdorf
4. Werda
