= German Space Travel Exhibition =

Museum in Germany

- Deutsche Raumfahrtausstellung
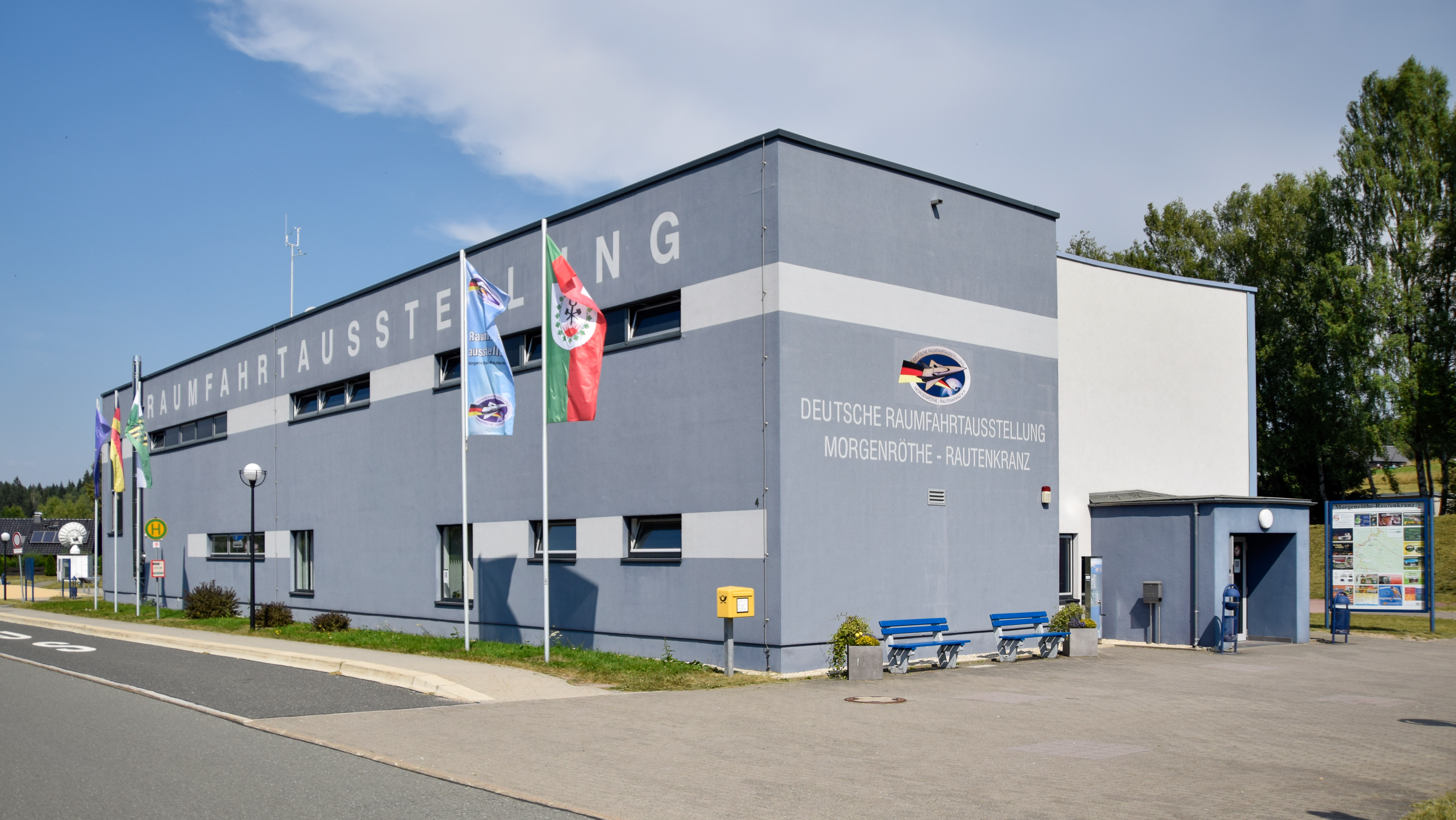
- Building that houses the German Space Travel Exhibition
- Established: 1979, 2007
- Location: Dr.-Sigmund-Jähn-Str. 4, 08262 Muldenhammer, Germany
- Coordinates: 50.46289°N 12.492598°E
- Type: Science museum, Aerospace museum
- Collection size: more than 1000 objects
- Visitors: 60,000 to 70,000
- Public transit access: Bus stop Rautenkranz, Raumfahrtausstellung, Bus #22
- Website: www.deutsche-raumfahrtausstellung.de/german-space-travel-exhibition/

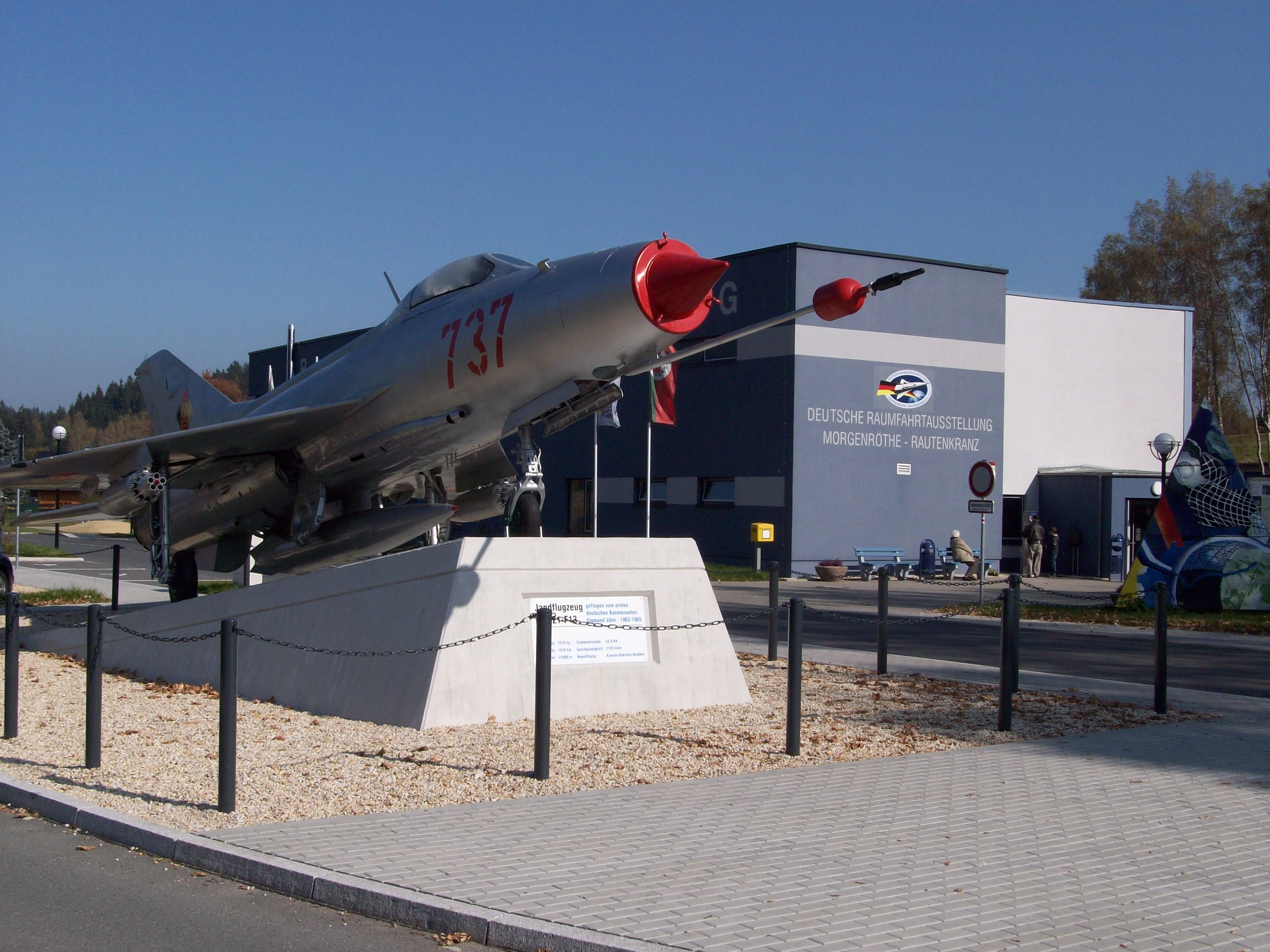
The MiG-21F-13 that the later German cosmonaut Sigmund Jähn also flew as a pilot in front of the exhibition building.

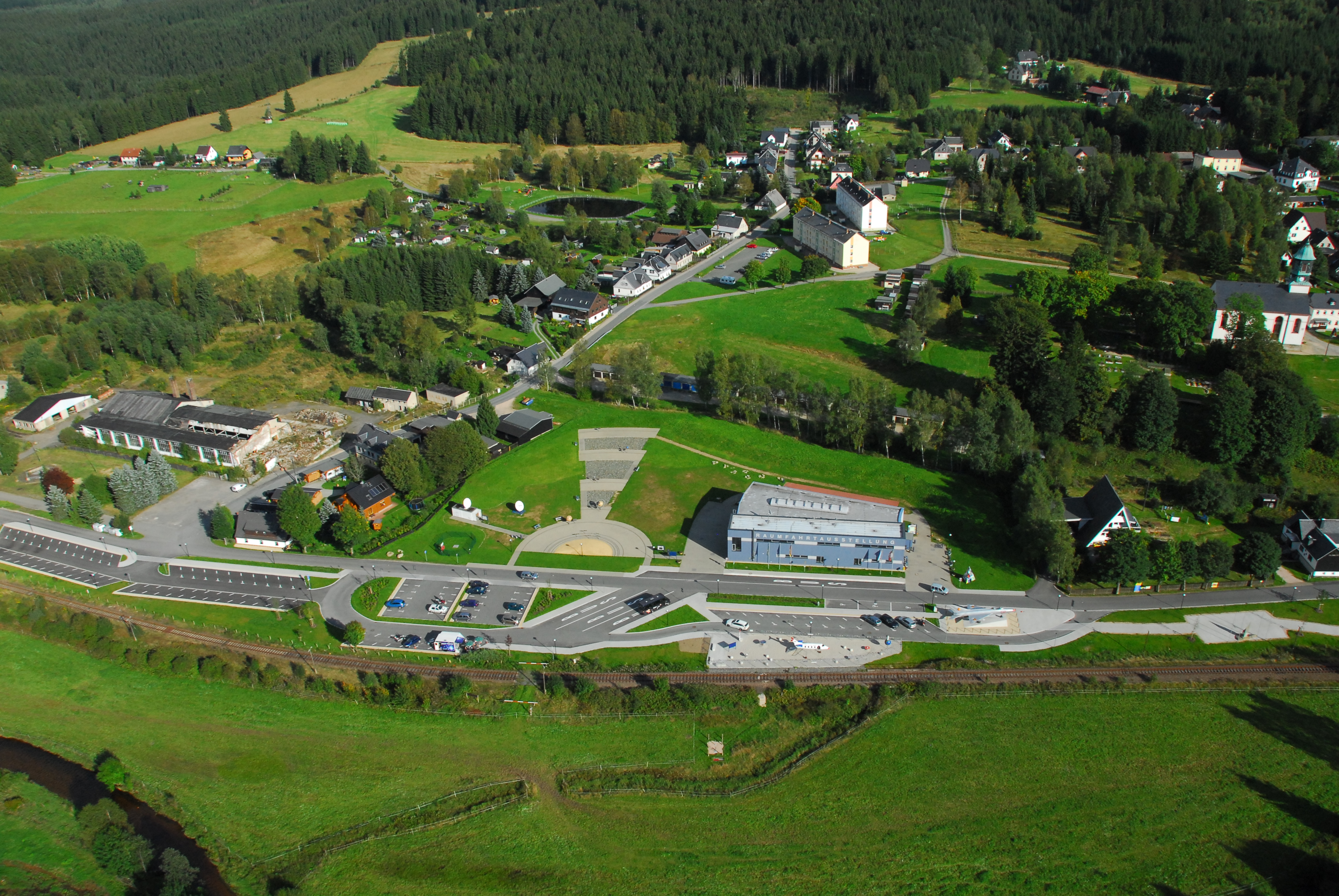
Aerial view of the exhibition's location with outdoor "planet park".

The German Space Travel Exhibition (German: Deutsche Raumfahrtausstellung) is a permanent exhibition in Morgenröthe-Rautenkranz in the southwest of Saxony, Germany, very close to the border of the Czech Republic. The exhibition is dedicated to spaceflight and space exploration.

== History ==
Sigmund Jähn, born in Morgenröthe-Rautenkranz, was the first German astronaut to complete a space mission as part of the Interkosmos program in 1978. To commemorate the joint USSR – GDR space flight, a permanent exhibition was opened in the municipality that is his birth place in 1979. The title was Permanent exhibition of the first joint cosmos flight USSR – GDR (German: Ständige Ausstellung des ersten gemeinsamen Kosmosfluges UdSSR–DDR). Today, Morgenröthe-Rautenkranz is part of the municipality of Muldenhammer in the rural district of Vogtlandkreis.

Following German reunification in 1990, this exhibition was broadened to feature a pan-German perspective on space. In 2006/2007, the exhibition was given a new building with significantly more space and an outdoor area including a Planetenpark with the depictions of our solar system's planets and a space travel-themed playground. The exhibition is operated by a non-profit registered association and hosts up to 70,000 visitors per year.

The exhibition has been scheduled for expansion since 2020. A federal ministry and a Saxon ministry granted together 8,7 million euros for an extension building and the establishment of a cinematic experience, space bistro, conference centre, and museum shop for visitors. Construction has started in spring 2023 after delays from the previously announced start in 2022. The topping out ceremony was held in May 2025. It has been announced that the extension building will open in 2027 with a new interactive exhibition "Mission Space" regarding the return to the moon. In the meantime, the exhibition can be visited via a side entrance.

== Collection ==
The exhibition concept, which was developed in close cooperation with representatives of the German Aerospace Center and the German Museum Munich, includes four main themes:

- Insights into the history of spaceflight and space exploration
- Presentation of the benefits of space travel for the Earth
- Information about space projects in which Germany is involved
- Appreciation of the achievements of German researchers, engineers, scientists, cosmonauts and astronauts

== Important Exhibits ==
- Accessible base block of the Soviet MIR space station
- Original – spacesuits
- Original engine of a V2 rocket
- Models of many carrier systems (rockets / Shuttle) on a scale of 1:25
- Engineering model AZUR – first German satellite
- Original experiments from the space stations Salyut, MIR and ISS
- Coupling simulator Soyuz spaceship / ISS
- Airplane MiG-21F-13
- In addition to the permanent exhibition, there are 1–2 special exhibitions a year.

== Operating association ==
The registered association Space Travel Exhibition Association (German: Deutschen Raumfahrtausstellung e.V.) has over 250 national and international members. Almost all German astronauts and cosmonauts are association members. The association designs and operates the exhibition and also organizes various symposia and events. A highlight event is the space travel days with astronauts and cosmonauts, technicians and scientists as well as space travel fans and technically interested people.

== Various ==
The former railway building that originally housed the exhibition still exists. Today it serves as a guesthouse and bistro, with decor inspired by space travel and steampunk. In 2020 the street where the exhibition is located was renamed from "Bahnhofstraße" to "Dr.-Sigmund-Jähn-Straße".
