= Rosenbach, Vogtland =

Rosenbach
- Municipality
- Coat of arms

- Location of Rosenbach within Vogtlandkreis district
- Interactive map of Rosenbach
- Location within Germany Location within Saxony
- Coordinates: 50°32′N 12°2′E
- Country: Germany
- State: Saxony
- District: Vogtlandkreis

Area
  - Total: 67.34 km^{2} (26.00 sq mi)
- Elevation: 487 m (1,598 ft)

Population (2025-12-31)
  - Total: 3,918
  - Density: 58.18/km^{2} (150.7/sq mi)
- Time zone: UTC+01:00 (CET)
  - Summer (DST): UTC+02:00 (CEST)
- Postal codes: 08539
- Dialling codes: 037431
- Vehicle registration: V, AE, OVL, PL, RC

Rosenbach (official name: Rosenbach/Vogtl.) is a municipality in the Vogtlandkreis district, in Saxony, Germany. It was formed on 1 January 2011 by the merger of the former municipalities Leubnitz, Mehltheuer and Syrau.
