= Morgenröthe-Rautenkranz =

- Ortsteil of Muldenhammer
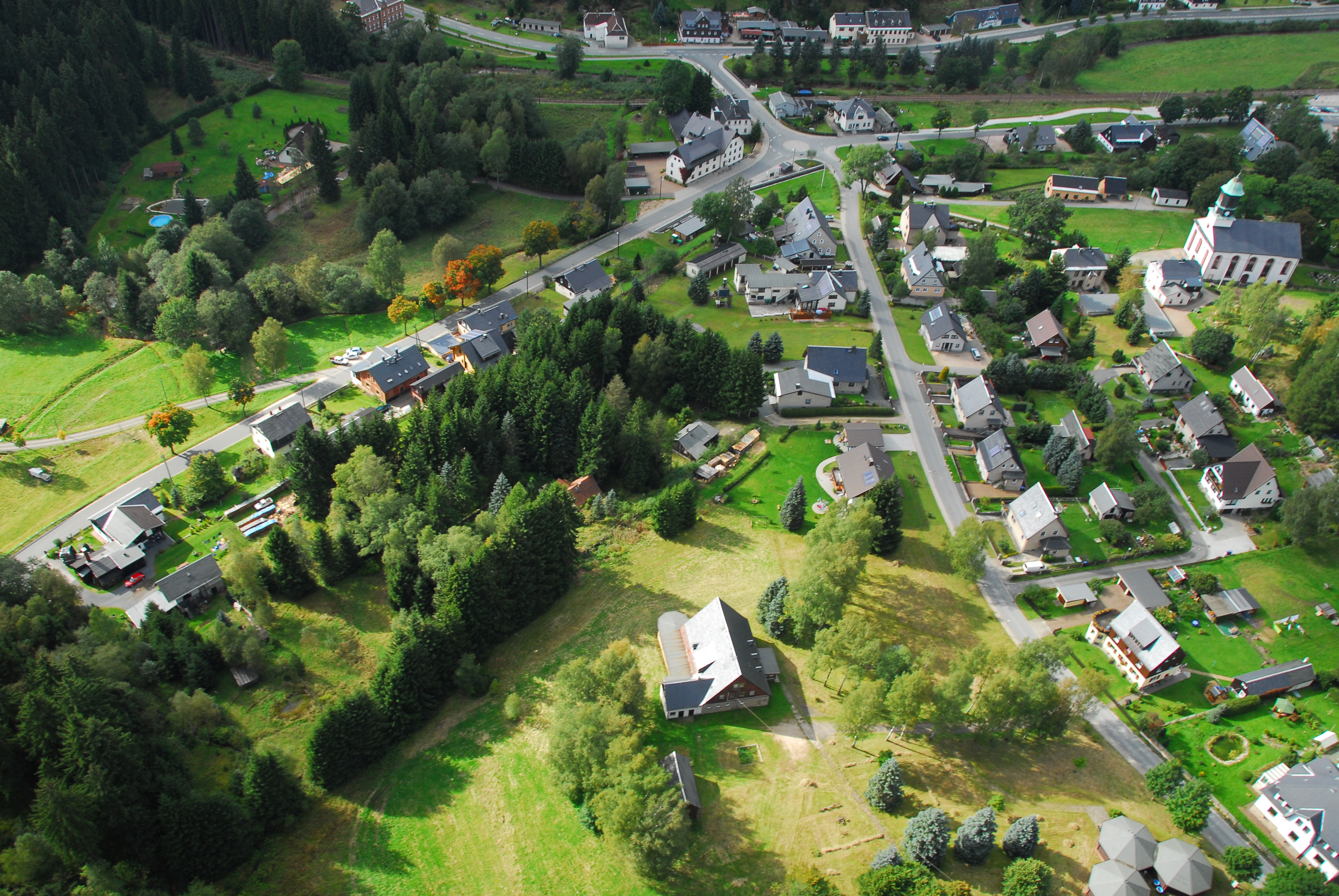
- Aerial view of Rautenkranz

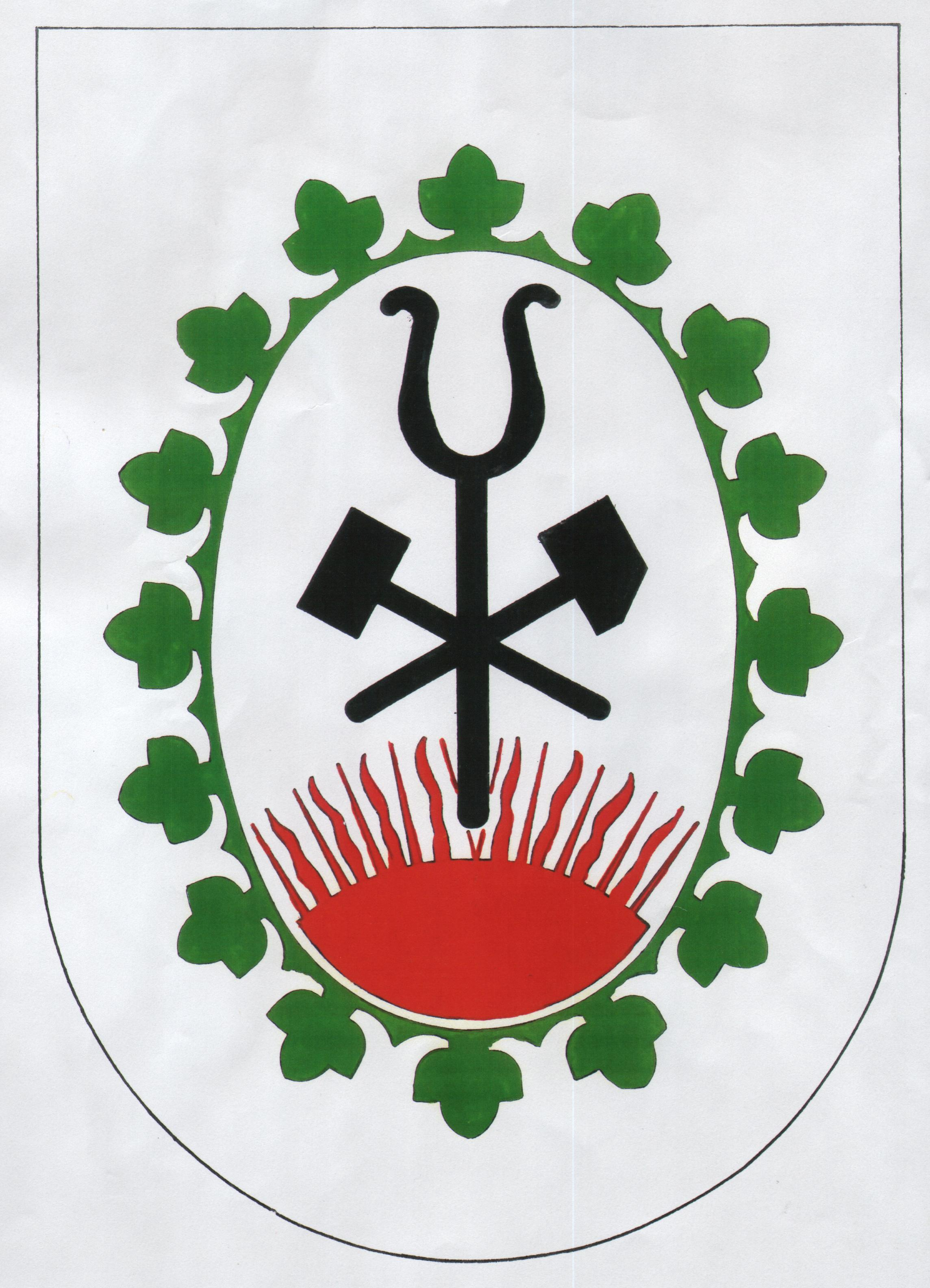
- Coat of arms
- Interactive map of Morgenröthe-Rautenkranz
- Location within Germany Location within Saxony
- Coordinates: 50°27′N 12°31′E
- Country: Germany
- State: Saxony
- District: Vogtlandkreis
- Municipality: Muldenhammer
- Subdivisions: 4

Area
  - Total: 30.03 km^{2} (11.59 sq mi)
- Elevation: 620–750 m (2,030–2,460 ft)

Population (2006-12-31)
  - Total: 851
  - Density: 28.3/km^{2} (73.4/sq mi)
- Time zone: UTC+01:00 (CET)
  - Summer (DST): UTC+02:00 (CEST)
- Postal codes: 08262
- Dialling codes: 037465
- Vehicle registration: V
- Website: www.morgenröthe-rautenkranz.com

Morgenröthe-Rautenkranz is a village and a former municipality in the Vogtlandkreis district, in Saxony, Germany. Since 1 October 2009, along with Tannenbergsthal and Hammerbrücke, it is part of the municipality Muldenhammer.

In Morgenröthe-Rautenkranz is the German Space Travel Exhibition.

== Personalities ==
- Sigmund Jähn (1937-2019), first German cosmonaut.

== Gallery ==
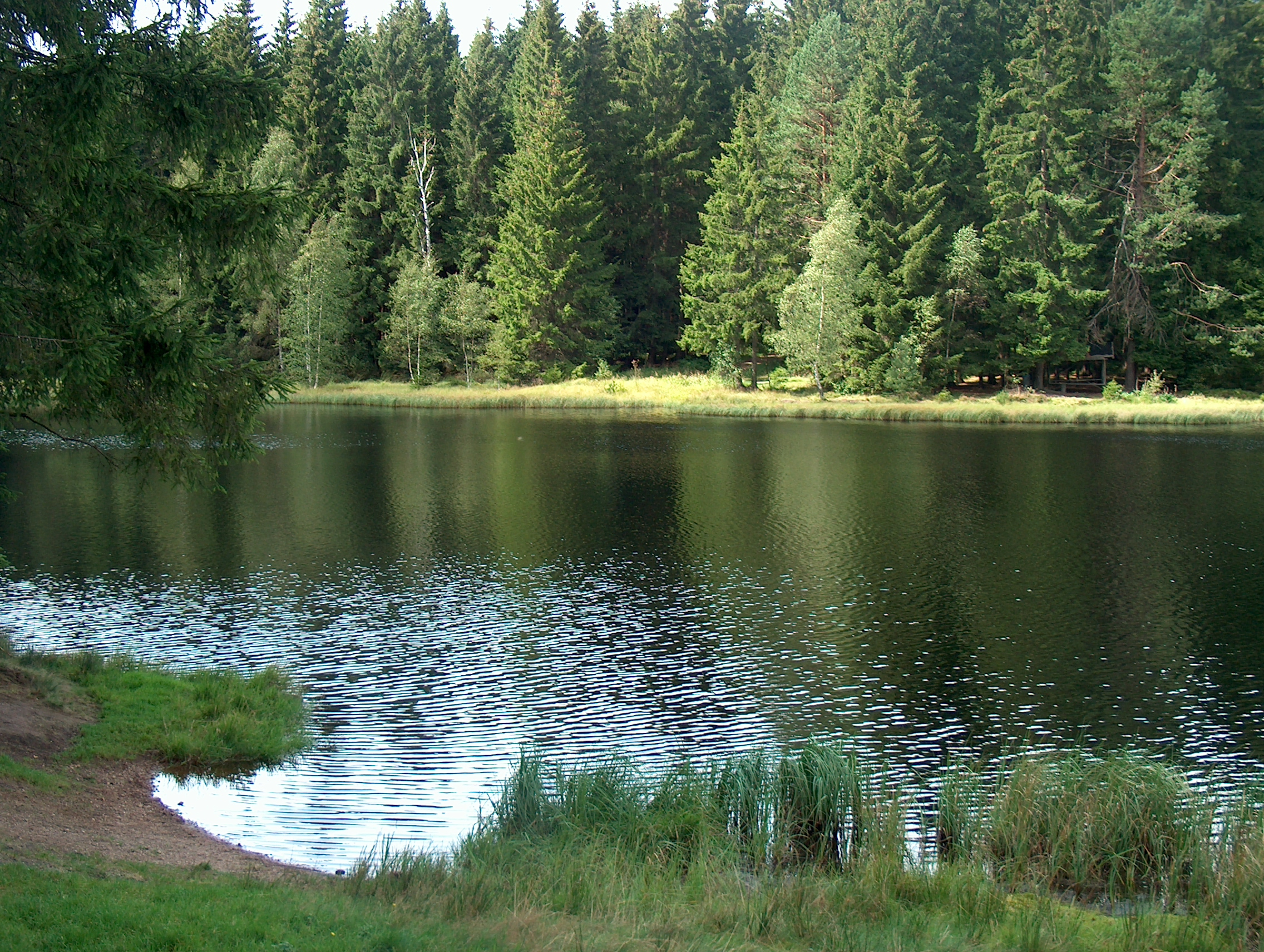
Vogtlandsee

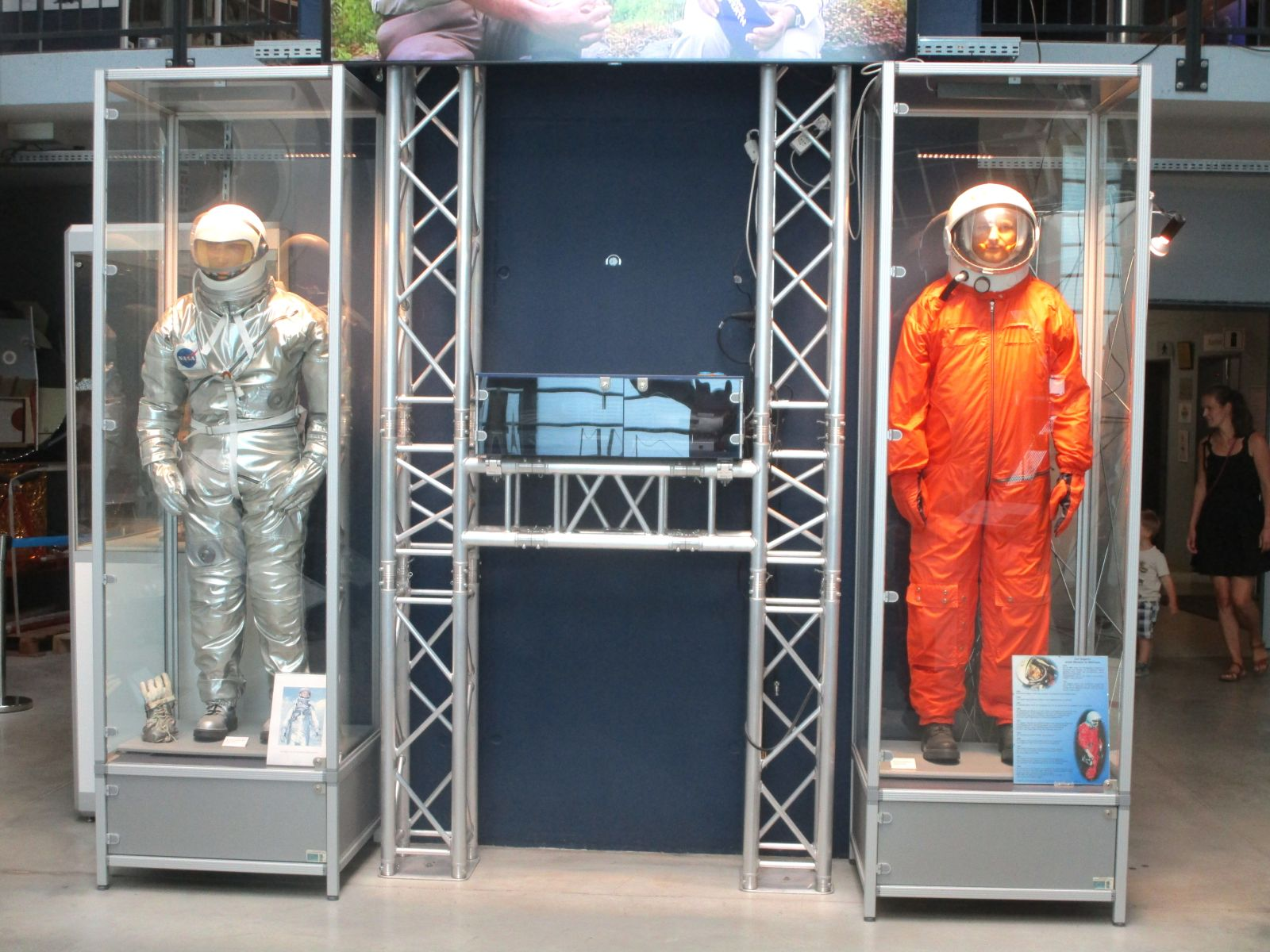
Space suits in the German Space Travel Exhibition
