= Bezelberg =

Mountain in Germany

- Location within Saxony

Highest point
- Elevation: 638 m above sea level (2,093 ft)
- Coordinates: 50°27′47″N 12°19′44″E

Geography
- Location: Saxony (Germany)

Geology
- Mountain type: Granite

The Bezelberg is a 638-metre high mountain with an observation plateau near Neustadt in Vogtlandkreis in the German Free State of Saxony. Because only the very top is wooded, it offers a good all-round view of the local area as well as the escarpment of the Ore Mountains that drops away to the northwest towards Steinberg bei Wernesgrün. In GDR times, the mountain was used by the military due to its proximity to the border.
