= Theuma =

- Municipality
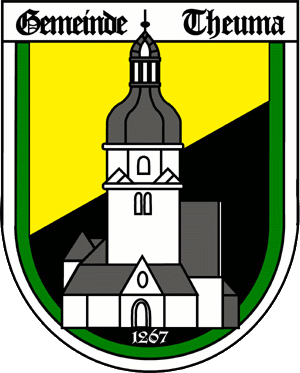
- Coat of arms

- Location of Theuma within Vogtlandkreis district
- Interactive map of Theuma
- Location within Germany Location within Saxony
- Coordinates: 50°28′12″N 12°13′21″E
- Country: Germany
- State: Saxony
- District: Vogtlandkreis
- Municipal assoc.: Jägerswald

Government
  - Mayor (2022–29): Uwe Riedel

Area
  - Total: 9.94 km^{2} (3.84 sq mi)
- Elevation: 483 m (1,585 ft)

Population (2025-12-31)
  - Total: 945
  - Density: 95.1/km^{2} (246/sq mi)
- Time zone: UTC+01:00 (CET)
  - Summer (DST): UTC+02:00 (CEST)
- Postal codes: 08541
- Dialling codes: 037463
- Vehicle registration: V, AE, OVL, PL, RC

Theuma is a municipality in the Vogtlandkreis district, in Saxony, Germany.
