= Mühlental =

- Municipality
- Location of Mühlental within Vogtlandkreis district
- Interactive map of Mühlental
- Location within Germany Location within Saxony
- Coordinates: 50°27′7″N 12°28′53″E
- Country: Germany
- State: Saxony
- District: Vogtlandkreis
- Subdivisions: 10

Government
  - Mayor (2019–26): Heiko Spranger

Area
  - Total: 39.64 km^{2} (15.31 sq mi)
- Elevation: 500 m (1,600 ft)

Population (2025-12-31)
  - Total: 1,151
  - Density: 29.04/km^{2} (75.20/sq mi)
- Time zone: UTC+01:00 (CET)
  - Summer (DST): UTC+02:00 (CEST)
- Postal codes: 08626
- Dialling codes: 037464
- Vehicle registration: V, AE, OVL, PL, RC
- Website: www.gemeinde-muehlental.de

Mühlental is a municipality in the Vogtlandkreis district, in Saxony, Germany. It consists of the villages Hermsgrün, Wohlbach, Saalig, Marieney, Unterwürschnitz, Oberwürschnitz, Elstertal, Tirschendorf, Willitzgrün and Zaulsdorf.
