= Tirpersdorf =

- Municipality
- Location of Tirpersdorf within Vogtlandkreis district
- Interactive map of Tirpersdorf
- Location within Germany Location within Saxony
- Coordinates: 50°26′5″N 12°15′15″E
- Country: Germany
- State: Saxony
- District: Vogtlandkreis
- Municipal assoc.: Jägerswald

Government
  - Mayor (2022–29): Ralph Six

Area
  - Total: 19.56 km^{2} (7.55 sq mi)
- Elevation: 486 m (1,594 ft)

Population (2025-12-31)
  - Total: 1,323
  - Density: 67.64/km^{2} (175.2/sq mi)
- Time zone: UTC+01:00 (CET)
  - Summer (DST): UTC+02:00 (CEST)
- Postal codes: 08606
- Dialling codes: 037463
- Vehicle registration: V, AE, OVL, PL, RC
- Website: www.tirpersdorf.de

Tirpersdorf is a municipality in the Vogtlandkreis district, in Saxony, Germany.
