= Muldenhammer =

- Municipality
- Coat of arms

- Location of Muldenhammer within Vogtlandkreis district
- Interactive map of Muldenhammer
- Location within Germany Location within Saxony
- Coordinates: 50°26′N 12°28′E
- Country: Germany
- State: Saxony
- District: Vogtlandkreis

Area
  - Total: 56.09 km^{2} (21.66 sq mi)
- Elevation: 665 m (2,182 ft)

Population (2025-12-31)
  - Total: 2,778
  - Density: 49.53/km^{2} (128.3/sq mi)
- Time zone: UTC+01:00 (CET)
  - Summer (DST): UTC+02:00 (CEST)
- Postal codes: 08262
- Dialling codes: 037465
- Vehicle registration: V, AE, OVL, PL, RC
- Website: muldenhammer.com

Muldenhammer is a municipality in the Vogtlandkreis district, in Saxony, Germany. It was formed by the merger of the previously independent municipalities Hammerbrücke, Morgenröthe-Rautenkranz and Tannenbergsthal, on 1 October 2009. It consists of the Ortsteile (divisions) Gottesberg, Hammerbrücke, Jägersgrün, Morgenröthe-Rautenkranz, Schneckenstein and Tannenbergsthal.

== Museum ==
- German Space Travel Exhibition in Morgenröthe-Rautenkranz.

== Personalities ==
- Sigmund Jähn (b. 1937), first German cosmonaut, born in Morgenröthe-Rautenkranz.
