= Werda =

Municipality in Saxony, Germany

- Municipality
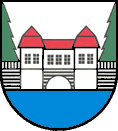
- Coat of arms

- Location of Werda within Vogtlandkreis district
- Interactive map of Werda
- Location within Germany Location within Saxony
- Coordinates: 50°26′15″N 12°18′20″E
- Country: Germany
- State: Saxony
- District: Vogtlandkreis
- Municipal assoc.: Jägerswald
- Subdivisions: 2

Government
  - Mayor (2023–30): Carmen Reiher

Area
  - Total: 13.56 km^{2} (5.24 sq mi)
- Elevation: 620 m (2,030 ft)

Population (2025-12-31)
  - Total: 1,458
  - Density: 107.5/km^{2} (278.5/sq mi)
- Time zone: UTC+01:00 (CET)
  - Summer (DST): UTC+02:00 (CEST)
- Postal codes: 08223
- Dialling codes: 037463
- Vehicle registration: V
- Website: www.werda.de

Werda is a municipality in the Vogtlandkreis district, in Saxony, Germany.

Since 1 January 1994 the former municipality Kottengrün is a part of Werda.
