= Ore Mountains/Vogtland Nature Park =

Nature park in Saxony, Germany

- IUCN category II (national park)
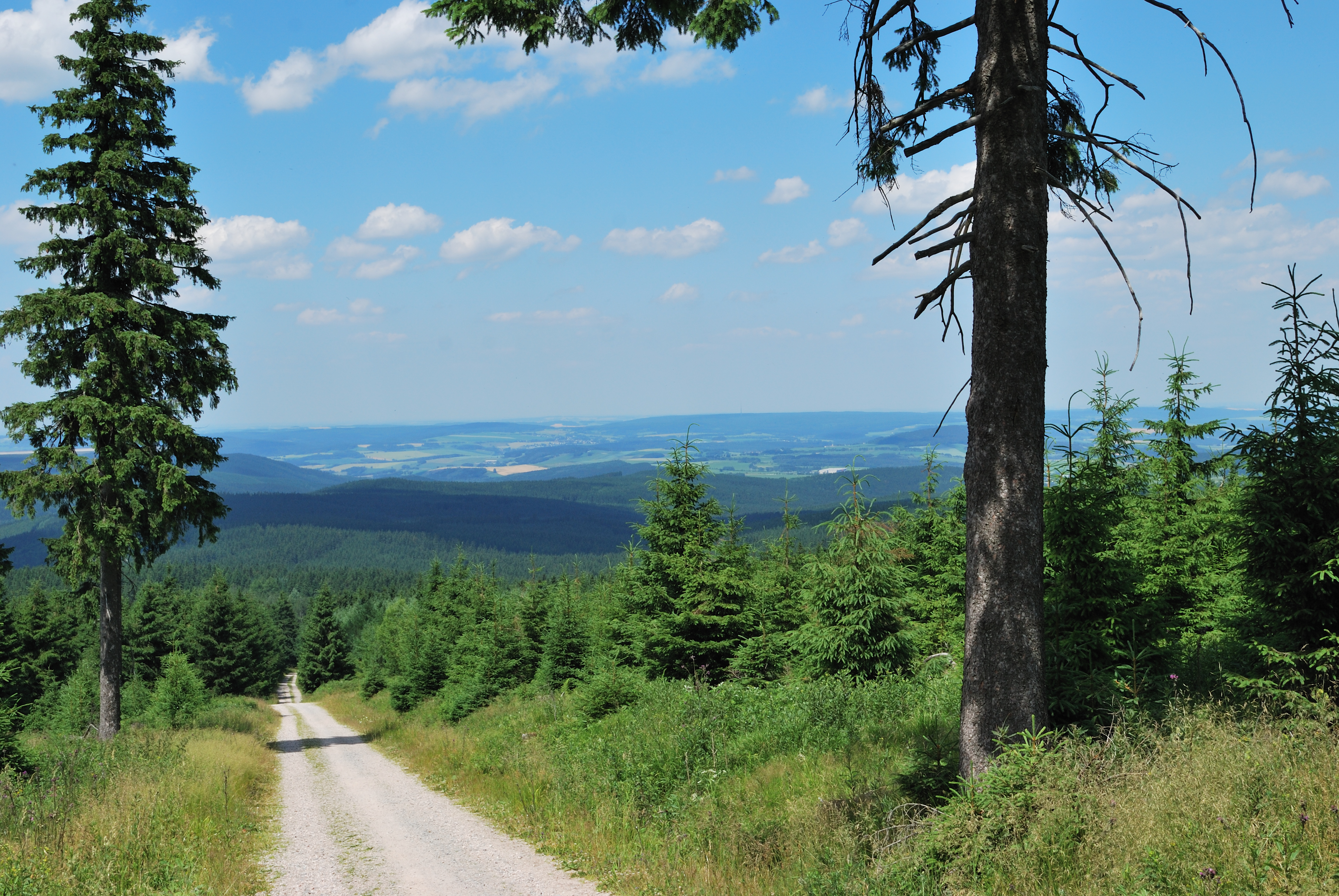
- View from the Fichtelberg looking north

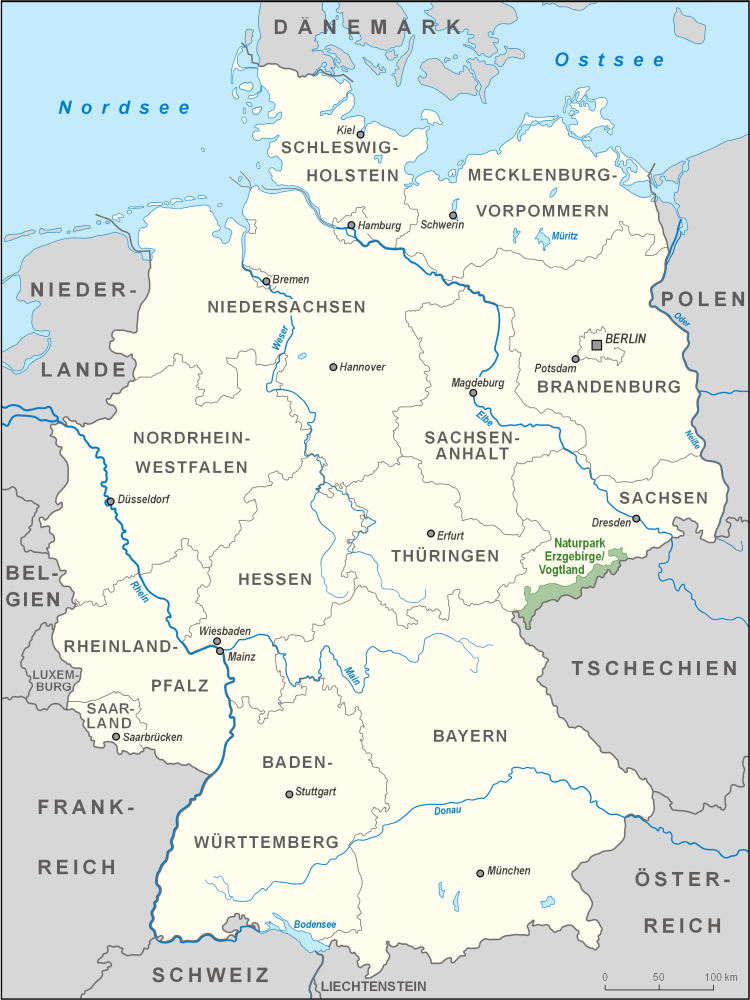
- Location in Germany
- Location: Saxony, Germany
- Nearest city: Annaberg-Buchholz
- Coordinates: 50°34′49″N 13°00′07″E
- Area: 1,495 km^{2} (577 sq mi)
- Established: 1990
- Governing body: Zweckverband Naturpark Erzgebirge/Vogtland

The Ore Mountains/Vogtland Nature Park (German: Naturpark Erzgebirge/Vogtland) extends across the upper slopes of the Vogtland and Ore Mountains in southeastern Germany along its international border with Czech Republic. It is the longest nature park in Germany with a total length of 120 km. Its management organisation is the Zweckverband Naturpark Erzgebirge/Vogtland. It includes the following conservation areas:

- 228 area natural monuments (FND)
- 15 protected landscapes (LSG)
- 41 nature reserves (NSG)
- 3 bird reserves

== Landscape ==
The nature park has a total area of approximately 1,495 km² and is located between the White Elster river in the Vogtland region and the Freiberger Mulde river in the Eastern Ore Mountains. It lies at an elevation of about 500 metres above sea level (NN) rising to 1,215 metres at the summit of the Fichtelberg, and includes all the important conservation areas, forests and natural monuments in the vicinity of the Elster Mountains and Ore Mountains ridge, that is in the upper reaches of the Western and Eastern Ore Mountains. It covers the southern part of the county of Vogtlandkreis as well as the counties of Erzgebirgskreis and Mittelsachsen, which forms the eastern boundary of the park. It is between 20 and 50 kilometres from the towns and cities of Plauen, Zwickau, Chemnitz, Freiberg and Dresden, and is easily accessible both to private as well as public transport over a very dense road network or by bicycle too. In winter, winter sports take place across the whole area. There are about 5,000 kilometres of signed footpaths within the park. The area is densely populated in places (approximately 327,000 residents in 92 towns and municipalities) and tourism is very well developed. Its land usage by area is as follows: 9% settlements, 30% agriculture and 61% forests. For its geographic and environmental aspects see the articles on the respective regions at: Vogtland, Ore Mountains, Western Ore Mountains and Eastern Ore Mountains. The holiday route known as the Silver Road (Silberstraße) runs through a large part of the park.

== See also ==
- List of nature parks in Germany
