= Oelsnitz, Vogtland =

Oelsnitz
- Town
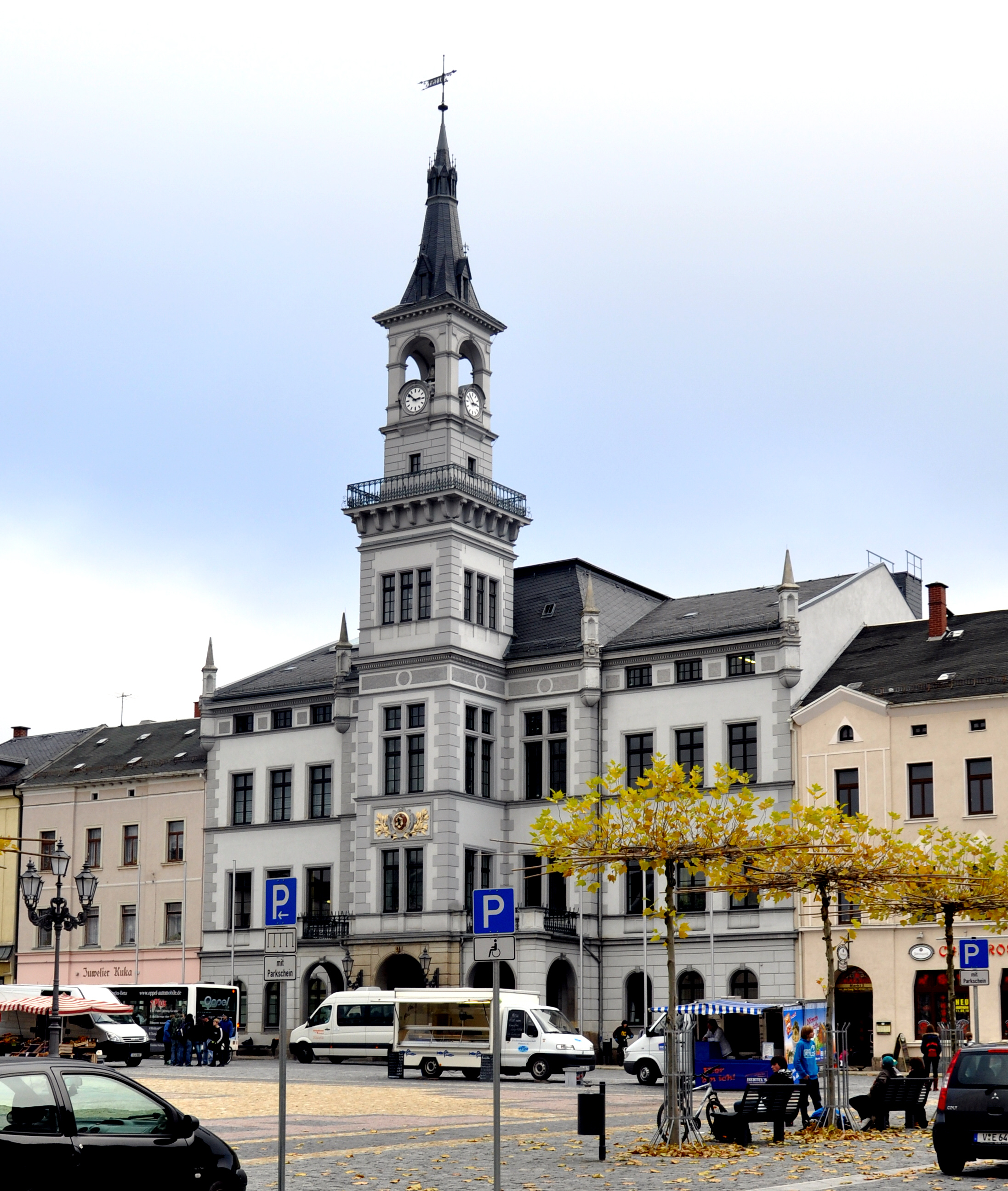
- Town hall

- Coat of arms

- Location of Oelsnitz within Vogtlandkreis district
- Interactive map of Oelsnitz
- Location within Germany Location within Saxony
- Coordinates: 50°25′N 12°10′E
- Country: Germany
- State: Saxony
- District: Vogtlandkreis
- Subdivisions: 11

Government
  - Mayor (2019–26): Mario Horn (CDU)

Area
  - Total: 53.67 km^{2} (20.72 sq mi)
- Elevation: 405 m (1,329 ft)

Population (2025-12-31)
  - Total: 9,930
  - Density: 185/km^{2} (479/sq mi)
- Time zone: UTC+01:00 (CET)
  - Summer (DST): UTC+02:00 (CEST)
- Postal codes: 08601–08606
- Dialling codes: 037421
- Vehicle registration: V, AE, OVL, PL, RC
- Website: www.oelsnitz.de

Oelsnitz (German pronunciation: [ˈœlsnɪts]; Upper Sorbian: Wolešnica) is a town in the Vogtlandkreis district, in Saxony, Germany. It is situated on the White Elster river, 9 kilometres (5.6 mi) south of Plauen and 25 miles (40 km) southwest of Zwickau.

In the 14th and 15th centuries, Oelsnitz belonged to the margraves of Meissen, and later to the electors of Saxony.

Nearby is the village of Voigtsberg, with the remains of a castle, once a residence of the governor (Vogt) of the Vogtland.

== Nearby villages ==
- Zaulsdorf
