= Bergen, Saxony =

Bergen
- Municipality
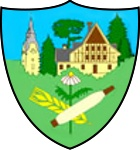
- Coat of arms

- Location of Bergen within Vogtlandkreis district
- Interactive map of Bergen
- Location within Germany Location within Saxony
- Coordinates: 50°28′35″N 12°16′45″E
- Country: Germany
- State: Saxony
- District: Vogtlandkreis
- Municipal assoc.: Jägerswald

Government
  - Mayor (2018–25): Günter Ackermann

Area
  - Total: 8.34 km^{2} (3.22 sq mi)
- Elevation: 473 m (1,552 ft)

Population (2025-12-31)
  - Total: 892
  - Density: 107/km^{2} (277/sq mi)
- Time zone: UTC+01:00 (CET)
  - Summer (DST): UTC+02:00 (CEST)
- Postal codes: 08239
- Dialling codes: 037463
- Vehicle registration: V, AE, OVL, PL, RC
- Website: www.bergen-vogtland.de

Bergen (German pronunciation: [ˈbɛʁɡn̩]) is a municipality in the Vogtlandkreis district, in Saxony, Germany.
