= Hammerbrücke =

- Ortsteil of Muldenhammer
- Coat of arms
- Interactive map of Hammerbrücke
- Location within Germany Location within Saxony
- Coordinates: 50°26′10″N 12°24′50″E
- Country: Germany
- State: Saxony
- District: Vogtlandkreis
- Municipality: Muldenhammer

Area
  - Total: 8.14 km^{2} (3.14 sq mi)
- Elevation: 680 m (2,230 ft)

Population (2006-12-31)
  - Total: 1,369
  - Density: 168/km^{2} (436/sq mi)
- Time zone: UTC+01:00 (CET)
  - Summer (DST): UTC+02:00 (CEST)
- Postal codes: 08269
- Dialling codes: 037465
- Vehicle registration: V
- Website: www.hammerbruecke.de

Hammerbrücke is a village and a former municipality in the Vogtlandkreis district, in Saxony, Germany. Since 1 October 2009, it is part of the municipality Muldenhammer.
