= Neustadt, Vogtland =

Neustadt
- Municipality
- Coat of arms

- Location of Neustadt within Vogtlandkreis district
- Interactive map of Neustadt
- Location within Germany Location within Saxony
- Coordinates: 50°28′N 12°20′E
- Country: Germany
- State: Saxony
- District: Vogtlandkreis
- Subdivisions: 5

Government
  - Mayor (2022–29): Bert Blechschmidt

Area
  - Total: 13.02 km^{2} (5.03 sq mi)
- Elevation: 610 m (2,000 ft)

Population (2025-12-31)
  - Total: 940
  - Density: 72/km^{2} (190/sq mi)
- Time zone: UTC+01:00 (CET)
  - Summer (DST): UTC+02:00 (CEST)
- Postal codes: 08223
- Dialling codes: 03745
- Vehicle registration: V, AE, OVL, PL, RC
- Website: www.neustadt-vogtland.de

Neustadt (German pronunciation: [ˈnɔʏʃtat]) is a municipality in the Vogtlandkreis district, in Saxony, Germany.

The mountain of Bezelberg lies within the municipality.
