= Vogtlandkreis =

Coordinates: 50°26′N 12°16′E

- District
- Flag Coat of arms
- Country: Germany
- State: Saxony
- Capital: Plauen

Government
  - District admin.: Thomas Hennig (CDU)

Area
  - Total: 1,412 km^{2} (545 sq mi)

Population (31 December 2025)
  - Total: 216,387
  - Density: 153.2/km^{2} (396.9/sq mi)
- Time zone: UTC+01:00 (CET)
  - Summer (DST): UTC+02:00 (CEST)
- Vehicle registration: V, AE, OVL, PL, RC
- Website: www.vogtlandkreis.de

The Vogtlandkreis (German pronunciation: [ˈfoːktlantˌkʁaɪs]) is a Landkreis (rural district) in the southwest of Saxony, Germany, at the borders of Thuringia, Bavaria, and the Czech Republic. Neighbouring districts are (from south clockwise) Hof, Saale-Orla, Greiz, Zwickau, and Erzgebirgskreis. It is the southernmost district in the state.

Plauen is the administrative centre and largest city of the district. Other major cities (Große Kreisstädte) are Reichenbach im Vogtland, Auerbach, and Oelsnitz im Vogtland.

== History ==
The Vogtland became part of the Holy Roman Empire under king Conrad III in the 12th century. In 1209, the minister dynasty administrating the area was split into three areas, Weida, Greiz and Gera-Plauen. When centralized power over the area decreased, county leaders, local administrators, called in Latin advocatus or in German Vögte, were appointed, giving the area its current name. The Vogtland war (1354-1357) ended this administration and the area changed ownership to Bohemia.

In 1546 Henry IV, Burgrave of Plauen got the area from the Bohemian king and later emperor Ferdinand I. His children inherited not only the land, but also crippling debts, so to pay these 1563 the area was bought by Saxony from Henry VI, and when in 1569 Henry VI finally ceased to claim ownership the new leadership created the first Vogtland district (Voigtländischen Creiß).

1657-1718 Saxony was split into parts, the Vogtland belonged to Saxe-Zeitz. In 1835 the new constitutional monarchy changed the administration and abolished the old district, and instead the Amtshauptmannschaft Plauen was created, and in 1867 those of Auerbach and Oelsnitz. 1907 the city of Plauen left the district and became district-free city.

1952 the East German government with the big administrative reform renamed them to Kreise (districts), and created the new districts Klingenthal and Reichenbach by decreasing the size of the previous ones. After the German Reunification the changes of the 1952 reform were mostly undone, and in 1996 the 5 districts were merged to form the Vogtlandkreis.

In the district reform of August 1, 2008 the city of Plauen was included into the district.

== Geography ==
The Vogtlandkreis is named after the geographic area it covers, the Vogtland, which was so called because it was governed by Vogts. Located in the Ore Mountains it contains a lot of forests. The main river is the White Elster. The mountain of Bezelberg (638 m) lies within the district.

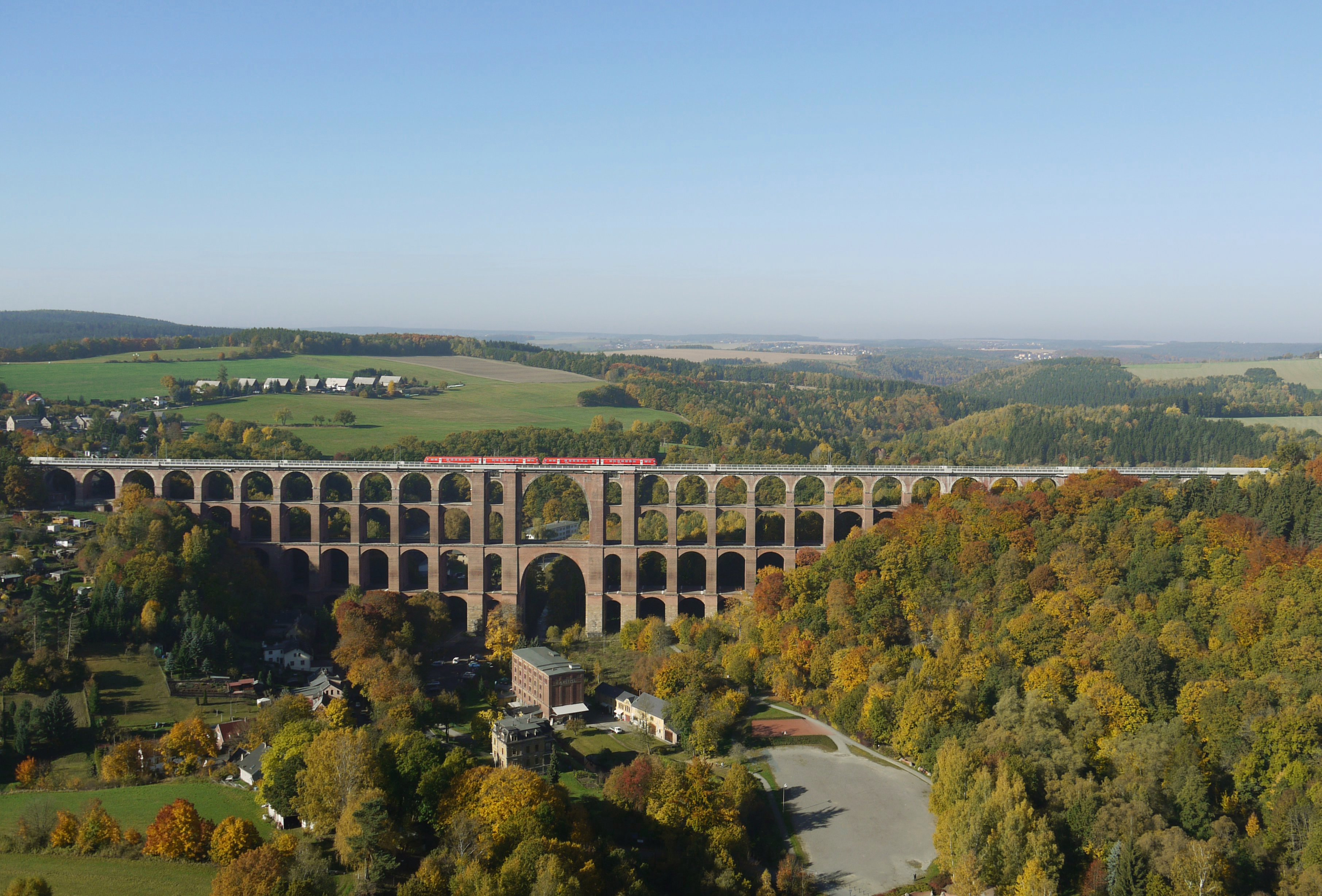
The Göltzsch Viaduct between Reichenbach im Vogtland and Netzschkau, the world's largest bridge made of bricks and landmark of the Vogtland

== Governance ==
=== County council ===
The district council of the Vogtland district was elected in the local elections on 9 June 2024. The 86 seats in the district council are distributed among the individual parties as follows:

Party	Votes	%	+/-	Seats	+/-
Alternative for Germany (AfD)	94,698	28.3	▲9.2	25	▲8
Christian Democratic Union (CDU)	91,470	27.4	▼3.0	24	▼3
Bündnis Sahra Wagenknecht (BSW)	44,126	13.2	▲13.2	13	▲13
Free Voters Vogtland e.V. (FW)	28,435	8.5	▲0.3	7	▲0
Social Democratic Party (SPD)	24,062	7.2	▼2.8	6	▼3
Free Democratic Party (FDP)	17,263	5.2	▼4.6	4	▼4
The Left (Die Linke)	14,110	4.2	▼8.2	4	▼7
Alliance 90/The Greens (Grüne)	8,392	2.5	▼3.7	2	▼3
Neue Perspektive Vogtland (PERSPEKTIVE)	6,904	2.1	▲2.1	2	▲2
FREIE SACHSEN (FS)	4,612	1.4	▲1.4	1	▲1
Valid votes	116,582	97.4			
Invalid votes	3,134	2.6			
Total	334 072	100.0		86	±0
Electorate/voter turnout	119,716	65.6	▲17.9		
Source: Wahlen in Sachsen

== People ==
The first German cosmonaut, Sigmund Jähn was born in the Vogtland. His hometown, the small town of Morgenröthe-Rautenkranz, in the municipality Muldenhammer, houses the German Space Travel Exhibition.

== Coat of arms ==
The lion on the left side of the coat of arms is traditional symbol of the Vögte of Weida, Gera and Plauen, which was confirmed in 1294. The eagle on the right side stands for the Holy Roman Empire, as the Vogtland belonged to the Empire directly.

== Towns and municipalities ==
Clickable map of towns and municipalities in the district

Major Towns (Große Kreisstädte)
Towns
Municipalities
1. Auerbach
2. Oelsnitz im Vogtland
3. Plauen
4. Reichenbach im Vogtland
1. Adorf
2. Bad Elster
3. Elsterberg
4. Falkenstein
5. Klingenthal
6. Lengenfeld
7. Markneukirchen
8. Netzschkau
9. Pausa-Mühltroff
10. Rodewisch
11. Schöneck
12. Treuen
1. Bad Brambach
2. Bösenbrunn
3. Eichigt
4. Ellefeld
5. Grünbach
6. Heinsdorfergrund
7. Limbach
8. Mühlental
9. Muldenhammer
10. Neuensalz
11. Neumark
12. Neustadt
13. Pöhl
14. Rosenbach
15. Steinberg
16. Triebel
17. Weischlitz

Verwaltungsverband

Jägerswald

1. Bergen
2. Theuma
3. Tirpersdorf^{1}
4. Werda
^{1}seat of the Verwaltungsverband;
