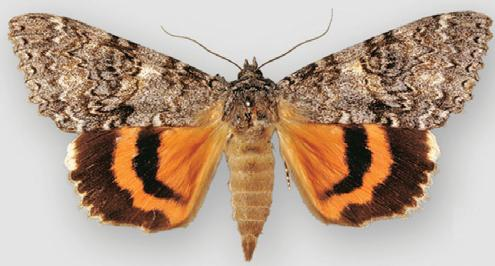

Scientific classification
- Kingdom: Animalia
- Phylum: Arthropoda
- Class: Insecta
- Order: Lepidoptera
- Superfamily: Noctuoidea
- Family: Erebidae
- Genus: Catocala
- Species: C. unijuga

Binomial name
- Catocala unijuga Walker, [1858]

Synonyms
- Catocala lucilla Worthington, 1883; Catocala unijuga var. agatha Beutenmüller, 1907; Catocala unijuga var. fletcheri Beutenmüller, 1903; Catocala patricia Cassino, 1917; Catocala helena Cassino, 1917; Catocala cassinoi Beutenmüller, 1918

= Catocala unijuga =

Once-married underwing

Species of moth

Catocala unijuga, the once-married underwing, is a moth of the family Erebidae. The species was first described by Francis Walker in 1858. It is found in North America from Newfoundland west to south central British Columbia, south to Kentucky and Missouri in the east, Colorado and Utah in the west.

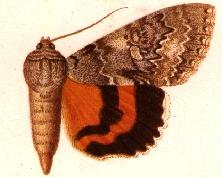
Illustration

The wingspan is 68–82 mm (2.7–3.2 in). Adults are on wing from July to September in one generation depending on the location.

The larvae feed on Populus tremuloides, Populus nigra and Salix species.

== Subspecies ==
- Catocala unijuga unijuga
- Catocala unijuga patricia Cassino, 1917 (Utah)
