= Babisnau poplar =

Natural monument in Kreischa, Germany

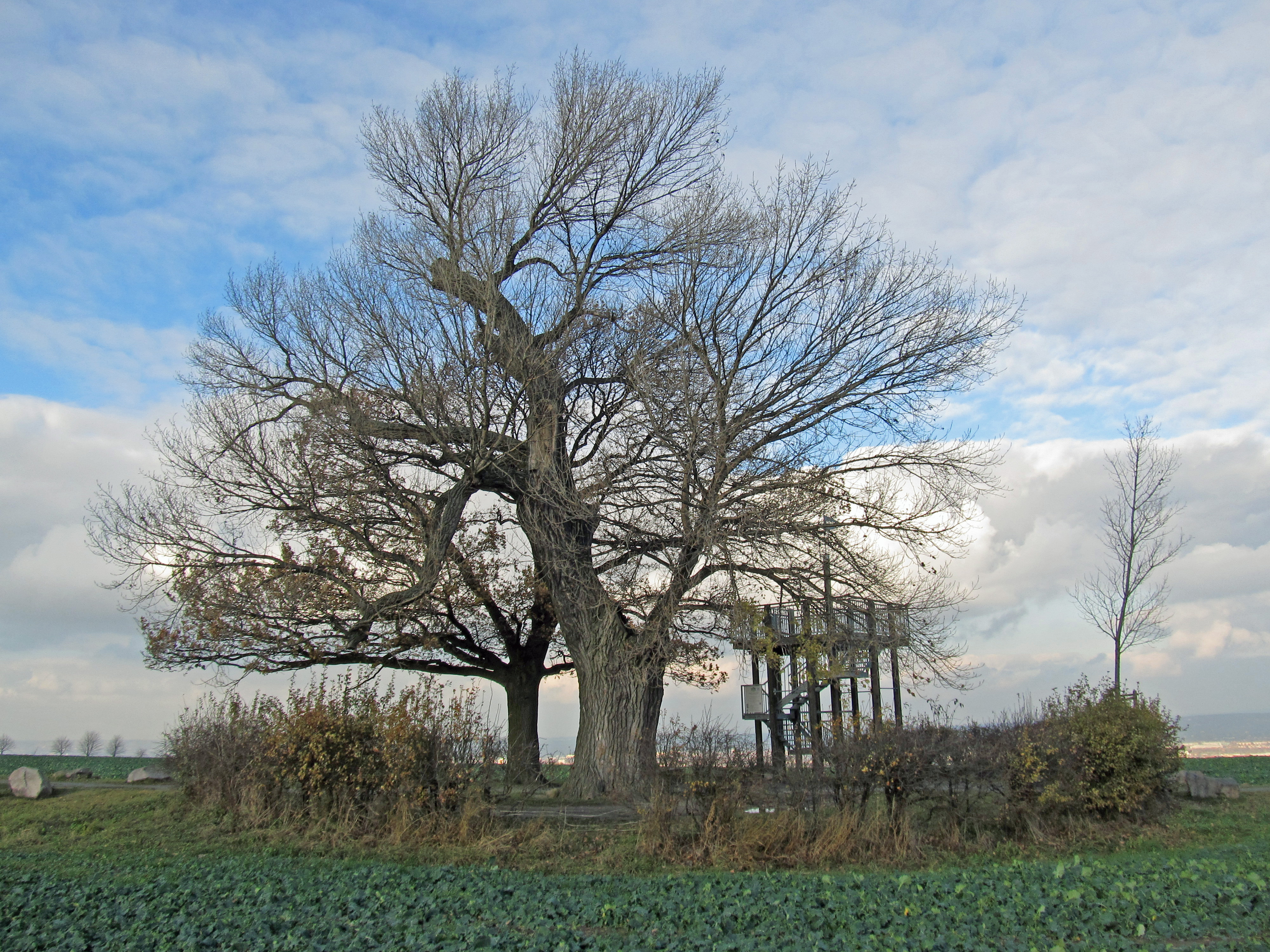
- Babisnau poplar with oak, Kreischa municipality, Saxon Switzerland-Eastern Ore Mountains district
- Interactive map of Babisnau poplar
- Species: Black poplar (Populus nigra)
- Location: Babisnau, Saxony, Germany
- Coordinates: 50°58′27″N 13°44′59″E
- Height: 330 m (1,080 ft)

The Babisnau poplar (German: Babisnauer Pappel) is a black poplar (Populus nigra) located near Babisnau, a district of the municipality of Kreischa in Saxony in Germany. It stands prominently on a plateau south of Dresden. It was planted in 1808 by Johann Gottlieb Becke, a landowner from Babisnau, as a border tree marking the boundary of his property. This tree has held the status of a natural monument since 1936. Over the years, it has endured significant crown damage due to strong storms in 1967 and 1996. The poplar currently stands at a height of 17.3 meters with a trunk circumference of 5.1 meters.

This tree is a popular excursion spot due to its panoramic views of the surrounding area, including the city of Dresden. During the German War in 1866, the poplar was used as a lookout point with a temporary observation scaffold. A permanent lookout scaffold was built next to the tree in 1885 and later renovated in 1922, 1963, and 1999. Since 1993, the Babisnau poplar has been vegetatively propagated on multiple occasions. According to local legend, the poplar's blossoming, which does not occur every year, is a sign of an impending end to a war. The Wendelauf, a popular race that circles the poplar, takes place twice a year.

== Location ==
The poplar stands on the unwooded 335-meter-high Zughübel, above sea level, with unobstructed views in all directions, especially to Dresden, about 110 meters above sea level, and to Saxon Switzerland. It is located about nine kilometers south of the Inner Old Town of Dresden and about 800 meters west of Babisnau, stands about 220 meters above the Elbe River, and is surrounded by agricultural fields. The poplar is located directly on the boundary between the districts of Babisnau, a district of Kreischa, and Golberode, a district of Bannewitz. In the immediate vicinity is a viewing platform and about ten meters away is the Bismarck oak, planted in 1890. On April 8, 2006, another black poplar was planted a few meters away, which grew from a cutting of the old poplar. The panorama from the poplar and the platform includes the wooded escarpment to the north above the broad Elbe valley widening, which borders the West Lusatian hill and mountain landscape to the south. This landscape can be traced from the Borsberg at 361 meters above sea level down to the Lößnitz Heights. To the east, the relief of the table mountains of the Elbe Sandstone Mountains is visible, and in the south, the mountain range featuring the Quohrener Kipse, the Hermsdorfer Berg, and the Wilisch frames the Kreischa basin.

The Babisnau poplar is situated on a Cretaceous (Turonian) Pläner sandstone table, with its top elevation reaching around 320 meters above sea level. This sandstone table is characterized by a slight dip, sloping gently northward towards Golberode, with slopes having inclinations of two to four degrees. At the Zughübel, there is a distinctive west and southwest-facing stratification step that rises approximately 40 meters high, marking the edge of the table where it meets the Zertal area of the Possendorf stream. On the top of the sandstones, there exists a shallow loess-loam cover, upon which shallow cover loess-parabrown soils have formed. These geological conditions at the Zughübel have created an environment where the poplar can thrive. The poplar belongs to a genus that typically grows in moist lowland areas rather than on a ridge, making its presence at this location unique.

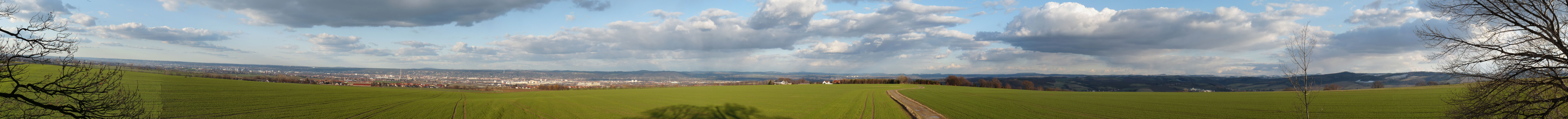

== History ==
In 1808, Johann Gottlieb Becke, a landowner in Babisnau, undertook the planting of the black poplar on the highest point of the Zughübel plateau. This act was carried out to mark the boundary between his land and the neighboring Golberoder Flur. However, the exact motivation behind this planting remains uncertain. It is unclear whether it was intended as a permanent marker to resolve a dispute with his neighbor or as part of an agreement between them. Furthermore, the age of the tree at the time of planting remains undisclosed. The tree's significance became increasingly evident over the years. In 1858, Maximilian Eckhardt added a tree signature of the poplar on the horizon in his Graphic View of Leubnitz from the North. During the Prussian-Austrian War of 1866, the poplar, already quite majestic, played a unique role. However, the fighting took place further south in Bohemia, so the poplar remained undamaged. After that, the platform served as a vantage point with a panoramic view and was increasingly visited by excursionists. Unfortunately, the exact duration of its existence in this capacity is not documented. The oldest known photograph of the tree dates back to 1878.

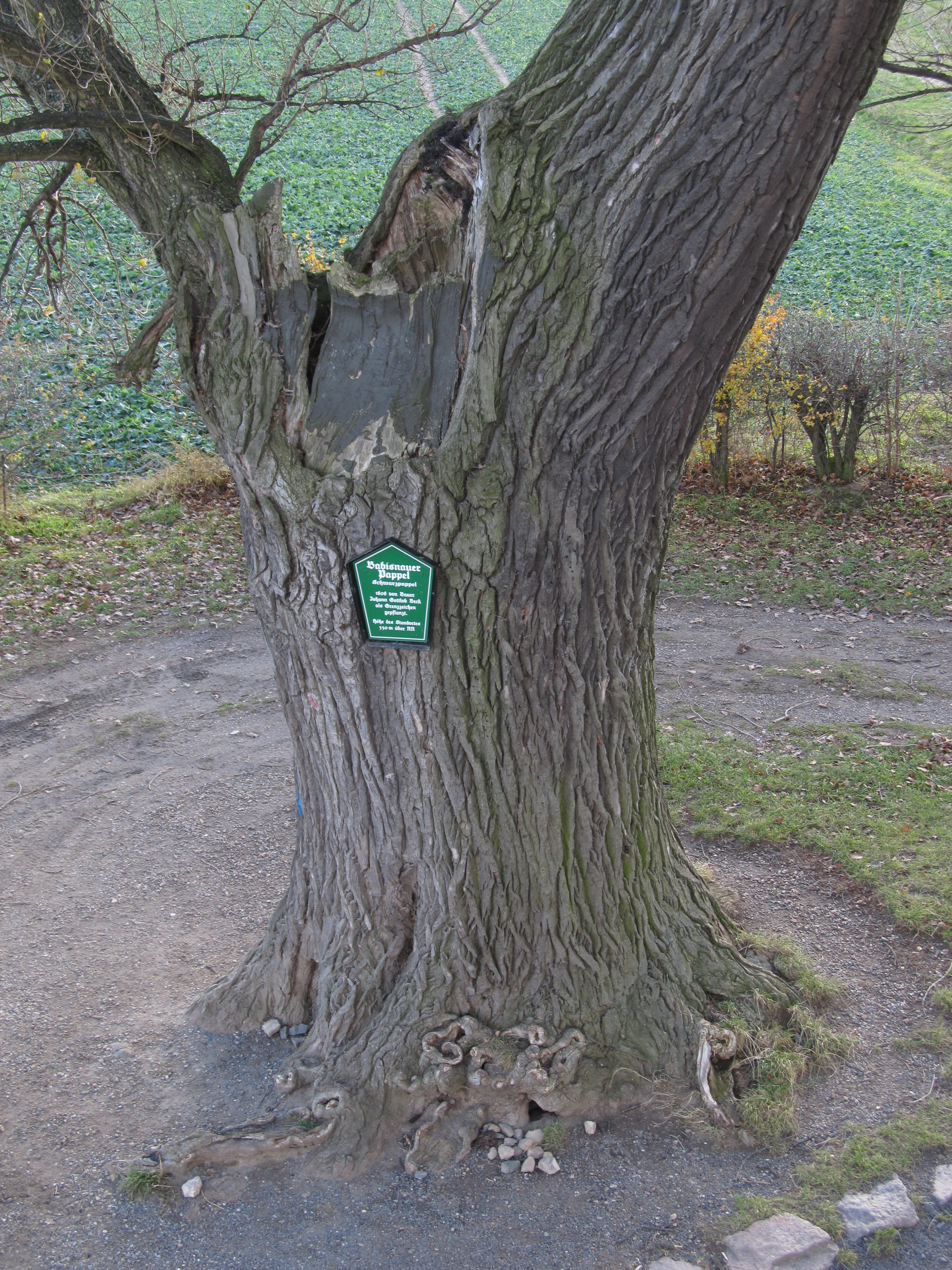
Root view from the platform (November 2012)

The road from Babisnau to Golberode and Possendorf passed by the border tree. However, in 1883, plans emerged to relocate this communication path. The landowner Gießmann, concerned about the potential impact on his neighboring field's yield due to the influx of numerous excursionists, considered cutting down the poplar. By this time, the tree had gained recognition not only as a natural landmark but also as a valuable sighting point for geodetic and similar activities. To prevent the felling of the poplar, delegates of the Mountain Association for Saxon-Bohemian Switzerland, established in 1877, convened a meeting on January 27, 1884. Negotiations with the owner of the poplar ensued, ultimately resulting in the sale of the tree to the Mountain Club for 300 marks. Additionally, the club leased the surrounding land, spanning 150 square meters. On May 6, 1884, the boundary stones were set by surveyors. Following the purchase, Ernst Wilhelm Zöllner established the Gebirgsverein section Golberode-Babisnau. Interestingly, the landowner Gießmann also became a member of the association. On May 17, 1885, the section inaugurated the first lookout scaffold, built for 360 marks. The scaffold, measuring about four to five meters in height, featured a viewing platform approximately three meters high, accessible via 16 steps. An open shelter for weather protection was situated beneath the platform, which was later partially enclosed.

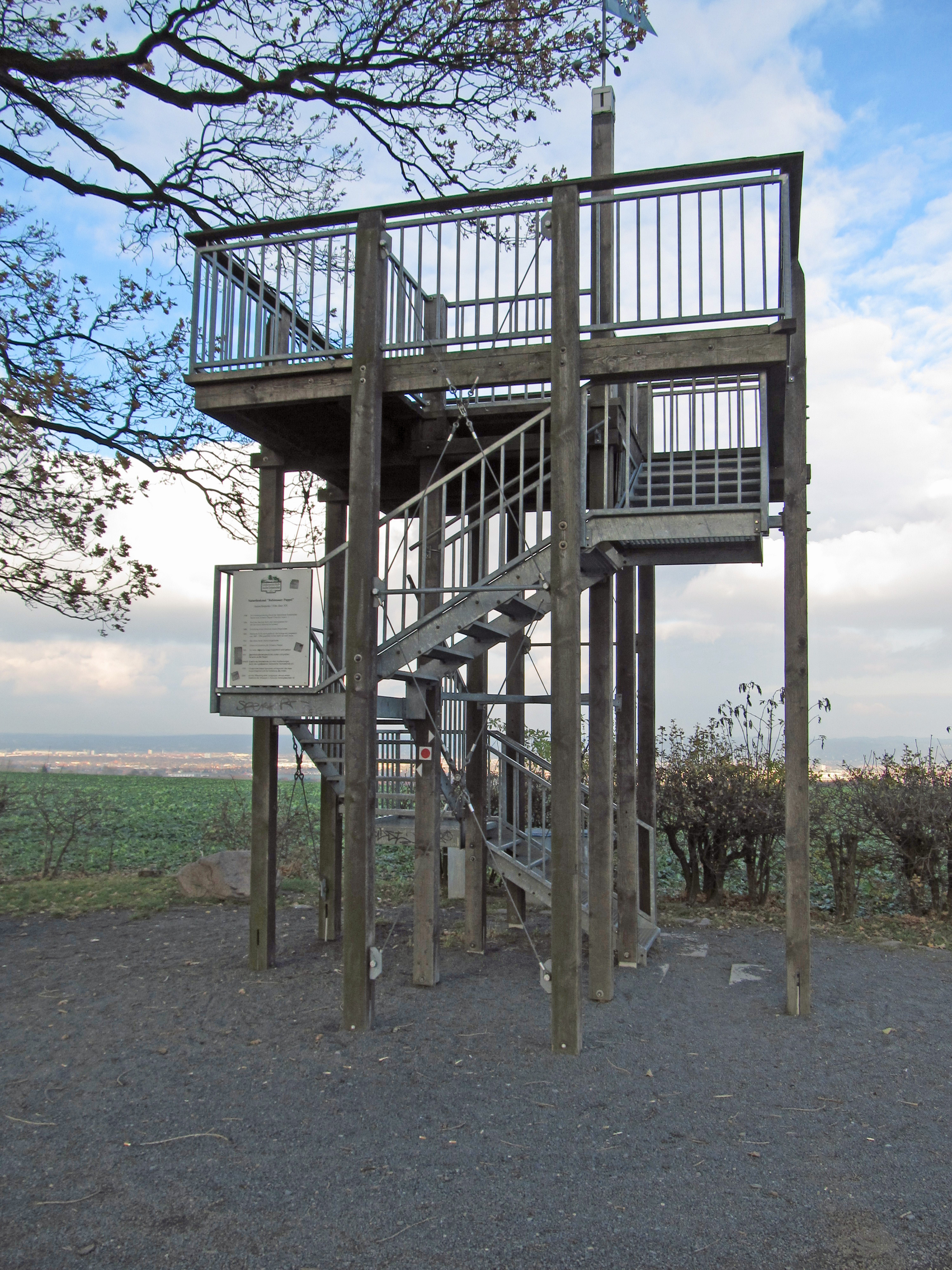
Viewing scaffolding (2012)

In 1886, the April edition of Bergblumen, illustrated sheets of the Strehlen Section, featured an article on the poplar accompanied by a drawing that depicted its nearly spherical crown. Over the years, members of the Strehlen and Golberode-Babisnau Mountain Club Sections planted four oak trees near the poplar between 1887 and 1896. The first oak, known as the Wettin oak, likely perished shortly after planting. To commemorate the 800th anniversary of the House of Wettin in 1889, another oak was planted. In the same year, the Gebirgsverein purchased 150 square meters of surrounding land for 12 marks per square rod. An oak was planted in 1890 to honor Imperial Chancellor Otto von Bismarck, known as the Bismarck Oak, and in the spring of 1896, the King Albert Oak was added in honor of King Albert. At one point, the poplar was surrounded by three oaks; however, only the Bismarck oak remains standing today. A photograph from June 1897, which also captures the lookout tower, reveals the poplar with its characteristic round crown. In 1899, the deteriorating and partially vandalized lookout scaffold underwent repairs.

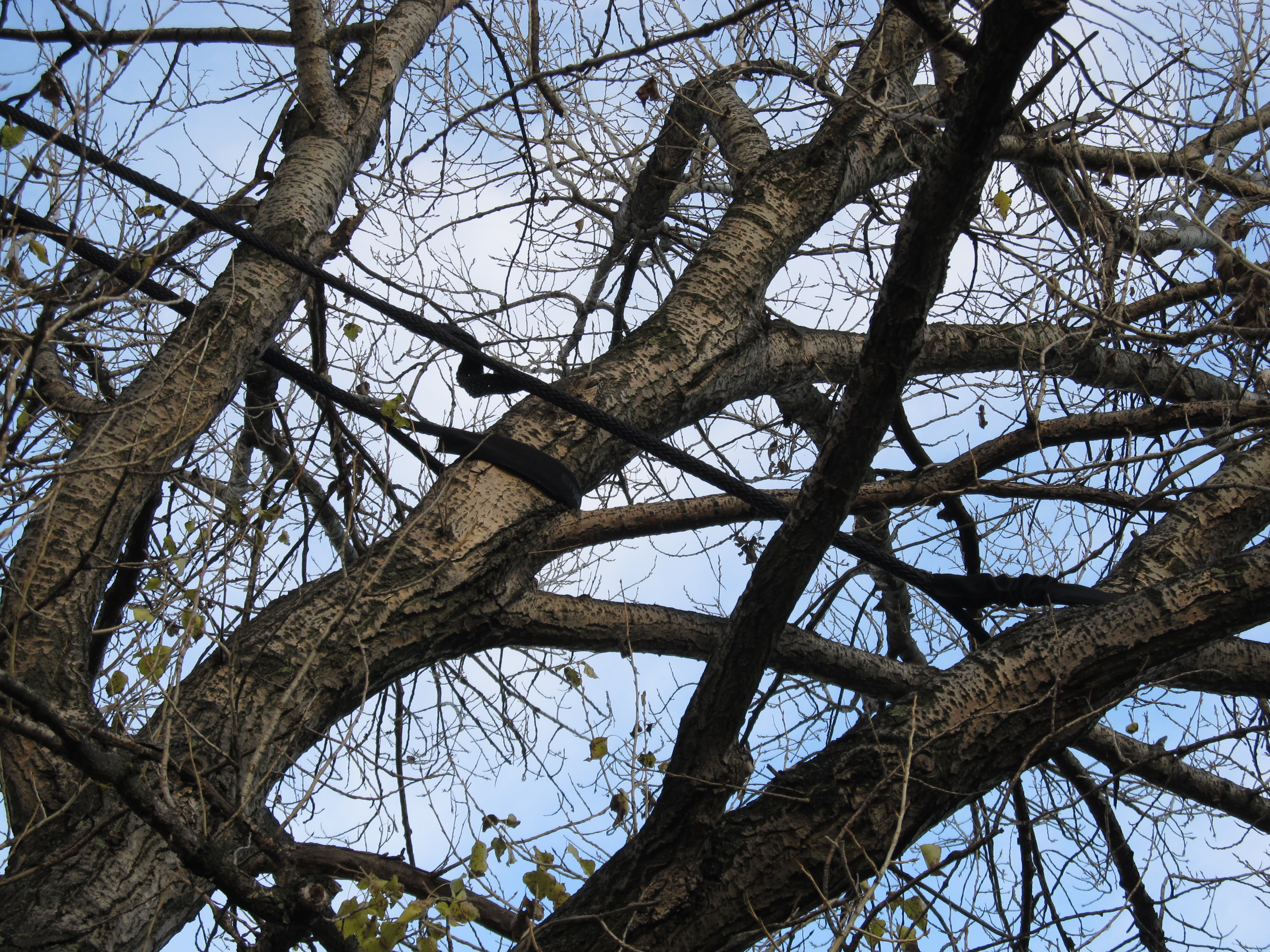
Rope-secured branches (2012)

On September 21, 1922, the Gebirgsvereinssektion Golberode-Babisnau, serving as the builder, celebrated the inauguration of a new four-meter-high lookout scaffold. This construction took two weeks to complete. A redthorn hedge was planted in 1925. A decree issued by the district governor of Dresden-Bautzen on December 28, 1936, designated the poplar as a natural monument under the Reichsnaturschutzgesetz (RNG) 128 years after its planting. From 1944 until the end of World War II, an anti-aircraft squadron was stationed at the poplar. As the German lines on the ground failed to hold, the poplar stood at the center of the war effort, and shortly before the war's end, there were plans to cut it down due to its status as a prominent visual marker. However, these plans were not carried out. In 1945, the Mountain Club disbanded, and the parcel containing the poplar and the Bismarck oak came under the care of the municipality of Bärenklause-Kautzsch. In 1957, Babisnau was annexed to the municipality of Bärenklause-Kautzsch in the district of Freital. A year later, on August 23, 1958, the Freital District Council designated the poplar as a natural monument for the second time in a resolution (108/58). During the late 1950s, the lookout structure was closed by the building authorities due to its unsafe condition resulting from weathering and wanton damage. However, in 1962/63, the Friends of Freital built a new steel viewing platform to replace the old one. On June 21, 1961, the Babisnau poplar with parcel 36a and the two surrounding parcels 35a and 40 were declared public property, which made them subject to state administration. However, the care remained with the municipality. During a strong thunderstorm on July 20, 1967, with hail following temperatures of 30 degrees Celsius, the poplar lost a third of its now large crown. One of the three main shoots going upward broke off, causing the crown to lose its spherical shape. The height was reduced from about 26 to about 20 meters. Because of its size, two tractors were needed to haul away the broken branch. From then on, the crown of the Bismarck oak, which was also large by then, increasingly took over the role of an eye-catcher from afar.

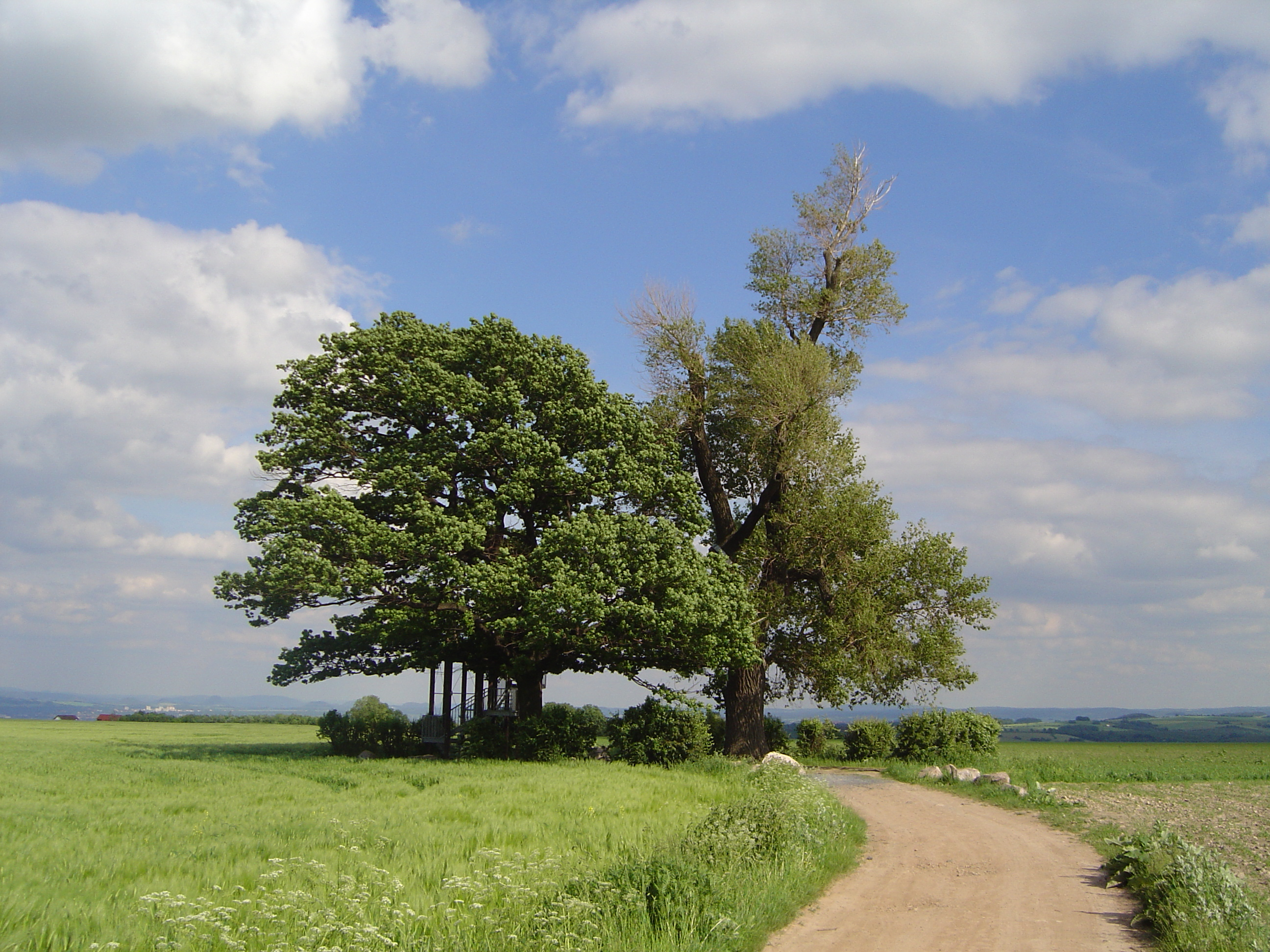
Poplar with oak and viewing scaffolding (2005)

On December 9, 1991, the first maintenance measures were carried out on the poplar by the district office Freital, including sawing the stump of the branch that had broken off in 1967. In 1993, during the night of December 30 to 31, vandals set fire to the hollow space within the poplar trunk. Around midnight, the fire departments of Bärenklause-Kautzsch and Kreischa were on the scene to fight the smoldering fire in the hollow tree trunk. It is not known who alerted the fire department. The entire water content of a fire truck was pumped into the hollow, but the stormy wind did not allow the embers to go out. Early New Year's Eve afternoon, the fire department again went to the poplar tree to extinguish with another tanker load of water. In addition, sand was filled into the opening of the trunk; the holes in the root area were plugged with earth so that the chimney effect of the hollow trunk subsided. This ended the smoldering fire. The damage to the poplar could have been worse if the foam had been used instead of water. In 1994, the district of Freital, which included Babisnau, merged with the district of Dippoldiswalde to form the newly created Weißeritzkreis. On August 23, 1995, the poplar was designated as a natural monument for the third time by decree of the district office Weißeritzkreis. In 1996, the local group Babisnau, founded on January 1, 1993, under the regional association Sächsischer Heimatschutz, took over parcels 35a and 36a of the district Babisnau, and in 1997, parcel 40 of the district Golberode, each acquired for the symbolic price of one mark. Because the viewing platform had dangerous rust spots, the board of the Saxon Heritage Society ordered the Babisnau local group to remove it on December 1, 1996. For the next few years, the area of the poplar remained without a viewing platform. During the night of July 5–6, 1996, the second main branch broke off during a violent storm. It was badly rotted at the junction of the branch that had broken off in 1967. Due to its considerable length of about seven meters, it could not withstand the storm. The crown of the poplar now consisted of only one-third with one of the formerly three main branches. The characteristic of the poplar has changed a lot and is characterized by one main branch.

Following the groundbreaking ceremony on June 1, 1999, a new lookout scaffold was officially inaugurated on July 2, 1999. The scaffolding and the landscaping of the surrounding area were financed with subsidies from the Dresden Regional Council and contributions from sponsors. As time passed, concerns arose about the stability of the poplar tree. A crack had developed at the wound from the branch that had broken off in 1996, and this crack was gradually widening. In response to these concerns, metal bands connected to a steel cable were affixed to the remaining crown in the year 2000. Towards the end of December 2003, another significant event occurred when a large lateral branch broke off, further diminishing the crown volume. By this time, the poplar's crown extended over the adjacent oak tree with only a few branches. The area of the branch break exhibited signs of fungal infestations, increasing the risk of a premature break. To address this threat, the large branch was significantly shortened on April 11, 2006, reducing its mass. This size reduction brought down the height of the crown once more, with the poplar now standing at a height of 17 meters, making it shorter than the adjacent oak tree. Flexible safety belts were also installed in addition to the metal straps. On August 16, 2008, more than 500 visitors came together to celebrate the 200th anniversary of the poplar's planting. Later, on May 21, 2009, a stone table and benches were inaugurated as a resting place at the site. This installation was made possible through the sponsorship of a Dresden family, and a ceremony marked the occasion.

At the viewing platform, there is a board with short information about the poplar. However, in July 2020, access to the viewing platform, which is constructed from a combination of wood and steel, was permanently closed due to safety concerns related to the deteriorating condition of the wooden step planks in the upper section of the platform, caused by exposure to the elements. After necessary repairs, the platform was successfully reopened in July 2022.

== Description ==
Trunk circumference und height
Year	Scope	Height
1896	4.30 m (1 m height)	23 m
1934	4.50 m (1 m height)	–
1957	4.70 m (1.3 m height)	26 m
1974	4.75 m (1.3 m height)	20 m
1983	4.78 m (1.3 m height)	20 m
1991	5.00 m (1.3 m height)	–
2007	5.13 m (1.3 m height)	17.3 m

Over time, the trunk of the poplar has remained uniform and well-preserved. At a height of approximately four meters, it is divided into three large branches, creating a round crown. Today, only one of these branches remains, leading to the irregular appearance of the crown. The previous branch breakouts have also caused the trunk to open. In 2004, the crown expanded in size from 14 to 19 meters. However, due to several branch breakouts, the height of the tree has been reduced to 17.3 meters.

The Babisnau poplar has been measured at various points in time. When first measured in 1896, the trunk circumference was about 4.30 meters, and the tree stood at a height of 23 meters. By 1957, it had reached its greatest recorded height of 26 meters, with a trunk circumference of 4.70 meters at 1.3 meters above the ground. In 2007, the girth at the same height had grown to 5.13 meters. According to the Deutsche Baumarchiv (German Tree Archive), which documents old trees in Germany, the girth at a height of one meter is listed as 5.00 meters in Trees that Tell Stories. However, due to its location, this poplar likely didn't reach the measurement data of black poplars of the same age that grew in more suitable environments.

== Miscellaneous ==
=== Wendelauf ===
In 1991, the first Wendelauf around the Babisnauer Pappel took place on New Year's Eve. Since then, this annual public run has become a regular event on the sports calendar of Dresden. By the end of the 1990s, over 300 participants, including runners, walkers, and cyclists, had taken part in the Wendelauf, which is not a competitive race. The Wendelauf occurs twice a year, as the summer Sonnenwendelauf and the Jahreswendelauf on New Year's Eve. In this popular event, the starting and finishing points are arbitrary, but the turnaround at the halfway point is always the Babisnauer Pappel. During the event, free mulled wine is served in winter and sparkling wine in summer, along with other refreshments. Participants can choose various routes of different lengths that lead to the poplar in a star-shaped pattern, and the mode of transportation varies as well, with participants including skiers and even a horseman in past editions.

=== Miscellaneous names ===
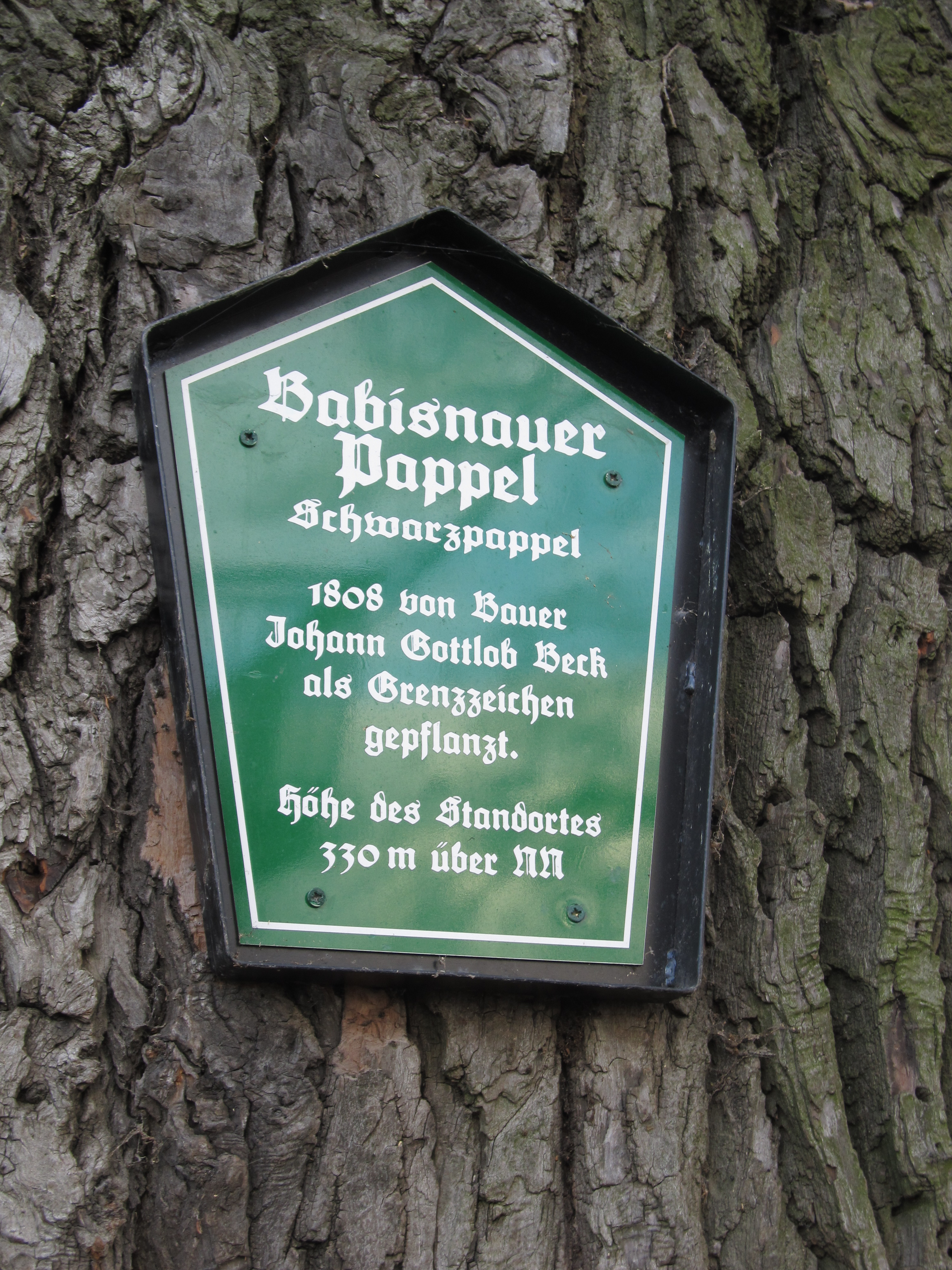
Information sign (2012)

The poplar is known today exclusively as the Babisnau poplar. However, historical records show that it had different names over time. In the magazine Bergblumen, the poplar was referred to as "Zöllner's Poplar" in the commemorative issue for the tenth anniversary of the Strehlen Section in 1888, as well as in two photographs from 1897 and on later picture postcards. This name likely originated from Ernst Wilhelm Zöllner, who was the chairman of the Strehlen section of the Mountain Club for Saxon-Bohemian Switzerland and purchased the poplar on behalf of the club in 1884. Around the turn of the century, the name Babisnauer Pappel came into use again in hiking books. Another name found in some hiking guides and on picture postcards of that time is "Silberpappel." Additionally, the poplar was listed as a Deutsche Pappel (German poplar) in the register of natural monuments.

=== Legend ===
According to legend, the Babisnau poplar is said to bloom when the end of a war is imminent. However, black poplars like the Babisnau poplar, do not bloom every year, which is a common phenomenon in botany known as the natural economy of plants and trees. The poplar is believed to have bloomed in 1870, signaling the end of the Franco-Prussian War in 1871. It reportedly bloomed again in 1918 after World War I. In the spring of 1943, the poplar once again blossomed and bore fruit abundantly. This event was noted by the German novelist Victor Klemperer in his diary on May 23, 1943. According to superstition, the blooming of the Babisnau poplar was seen as an omen that the war would soon end. Klemperer mentioned this legend in his work "LTI - Notebook of a Philologist" in 1947, noting that the Babisnau poplar rarely bloomed and that he had been told that it had also bloomed during all other wars in the 19th century. When the poplar bloomed in 1943, the legend of the end of the war was known far beyond Dresden. For example, it was reported from Upper Silesia that there was a poplar tree near Dresden whose blossom the war ended. People who had heard about the miraculous blossom came from faraway places to seek out the poplar. Two years later, in May 1945, the world war ended. It is worth noting that the "blossom" people perceived was the ripe woolly fruiting stalks of the poplar. The true poplar blossom is very inconspicuous.

=== Vegetative propagation ===
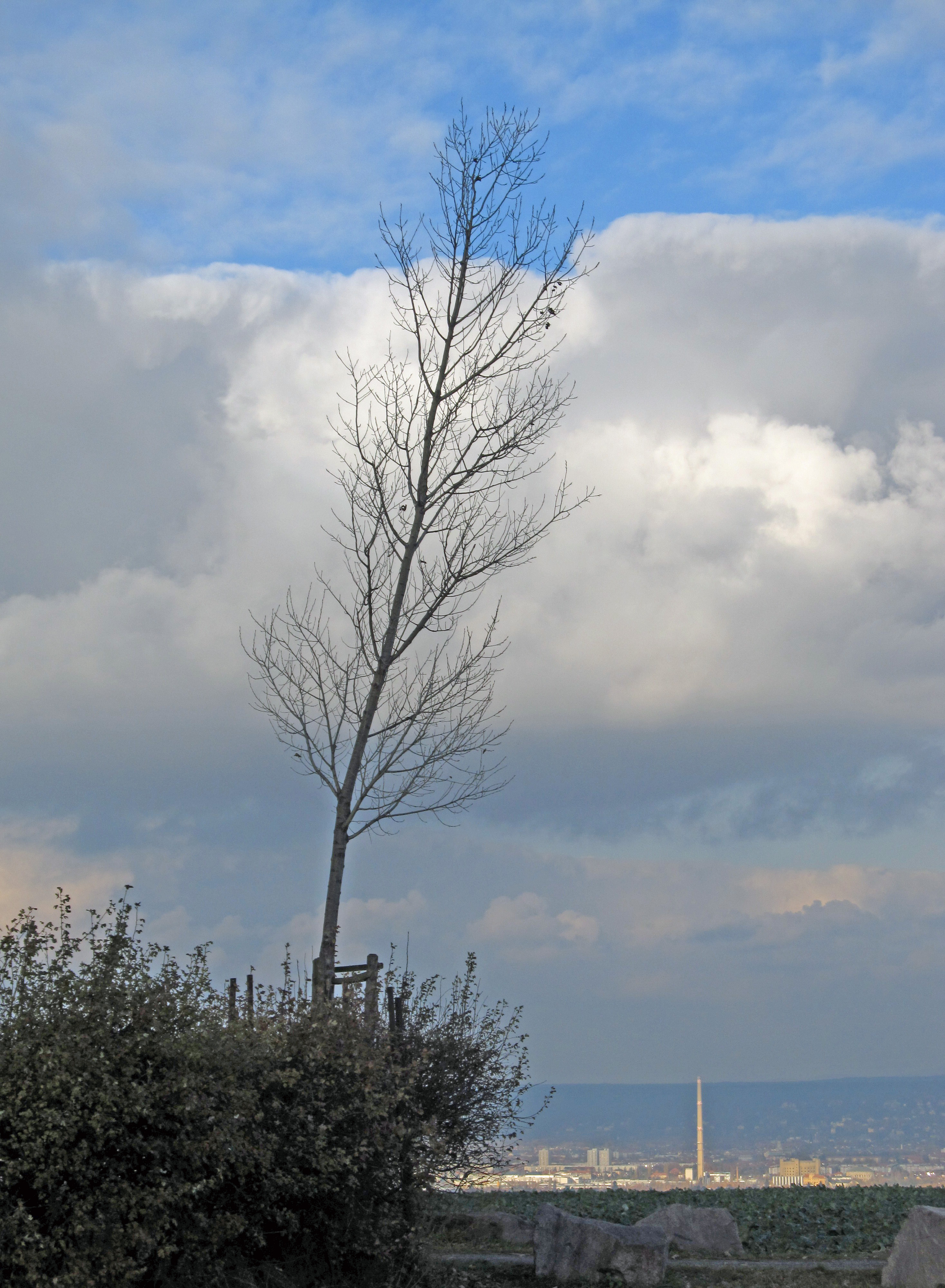
New Babisnau poplar (2012)

The Saxon Forest Research Institute in Graupa tested the poplar for genetic purity. It came to a positive result and thus ruled out the possibility that it was a bastard black poplar. In February 1993, Rudolf Schröder, the then-director of the Dresden Botanical Garden, took cuttings from the poplar for propagation. These cuttings were then cared for by Steffen Ruhtz, the chairman of the Babisnau local group in the Saxon Heritage Society. The young trees were cultivated under conditions like those of the original tree. In 1997, one of the young black poplar trees was planted on the grounds of the observatory in Radeberg near Dresden. On April 8, 2006, the same year that the Babisnau poplar was chosen as the Tree of the Year, members of the Golden Heights Regional Group of the National Association planted a second black poplar next to the Babisnau poplar. By early November 2007, the young tree had grown to a height of 8.20 meters.
