= Laßnitzhöhe =

- Municipality
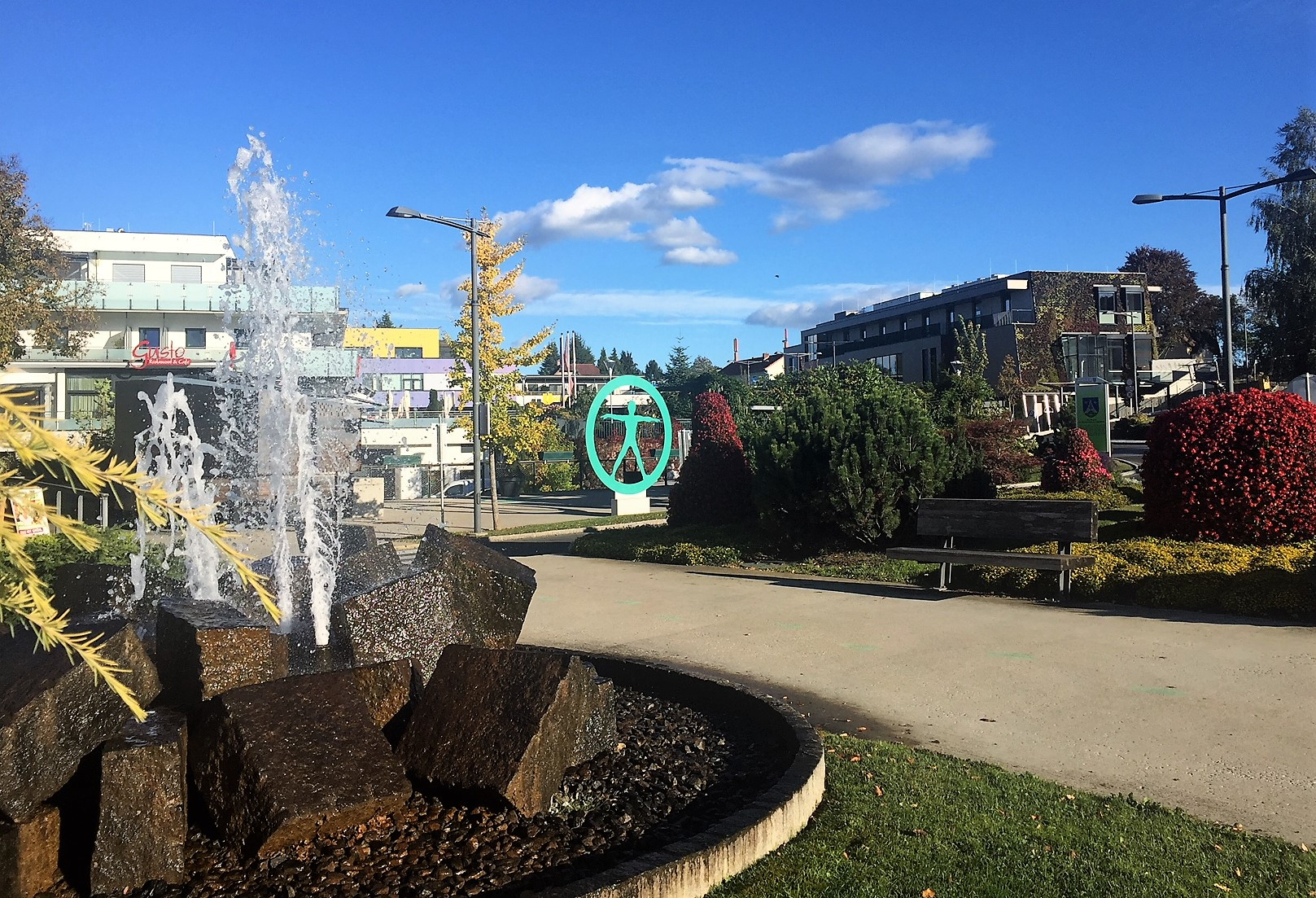
- Laßnitzhöhe city center from the town fountain and garden, with the main shopping area in the background

- Coat of arms

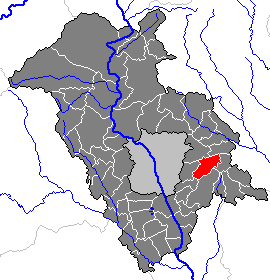
- Location within Graz-Umgebung district

- Location within Austria
- Coordinates: 47°04′36″N 15°34′56″E
- Country: Austria
- State: Styria
- District: Graz-Umgebung

Government
  - Mayor: Bernhard Liebmann (ÖVP)

Area
  - Total: 14.82 km^{2} (5.72 sq mi)
- Elevation: 536 m (1,759 ft)

Population (2018-01-01)
  - Total: 2,817
  - Density: 190.1/km^{2} (492.3/sq mi)
- Time zone: UTC+1 (CET)
  - Summer (DST): UTC+2 (CEST)
- Postal code: 8301
- Area code: 03133
- Vehicle registration: GU
- Website: www.lassnitzhoehe.gv.at

Laßnitzhöhe is a municipality with 2,718 inhabitants (on 1 January 2016) in the district of Graz-Umgebung in Styria, Austria. Laßnitz means brook in the forest and refers to the local river Laßnitz.

== Geography ==
=== General and location ===
Laßnitzhöhe, located 10 km east of Graz, is a settlement on top of the elongated hummock named Schemmerlrücken. The municipality expands over 4 km either in north-south and east-west direction and covers an area of 14.85 square kilometres (5.73 mi^{2}).
Since October 1929 Laßnitzhöhe is recognised as health resort and was appointed to a climatic health spa in 1984.

=== Municipality structure ===
The municipality is composed of the subdistricts Autal, Krachelberg, Moggau, Rastbühel, Wöbling und Oberlaßnitz.

=== Climate ===
In the area of the watershed between the Mur and Raab lies the gradual transition between central and eastern European climate. The town enjoys a mild, sunny winters and cooler summers. Warm southerly winds are predominantly in the summer and allow stays in the open late into the night. The average annual temperature is higher by 2 °C as usual for the altitude.

== History ==
=== Name ===
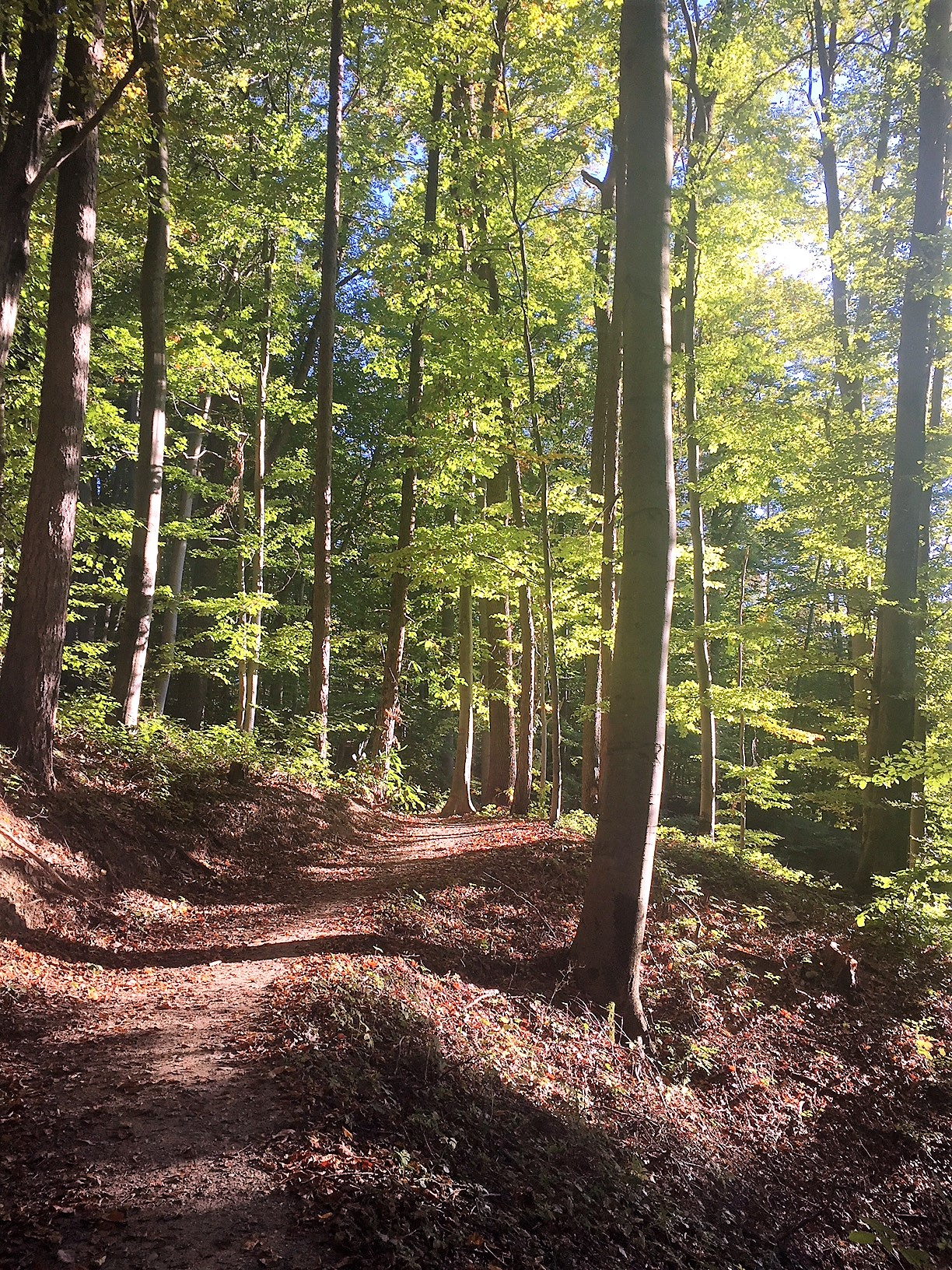
Forest surrounding Laßnitzhöhe, taken on the Sebastian RELOADED® adventure trail

"Laßnitz" comes from the Slavic (originally, for example, "Lieznica", "Luosniza") and means "brook in the forest". In the linguistics Laßnitz (from the year 890: Luonzniza) also "*loNč'nica" "Wiesenbach" (meadow brook) is discussed, as another option (from the year 1345: Lesniz, Laßnitz in Murau, or in 1080 in the Paltental Laznich) "*laz'nica" "Gereutbach". or "Rodebach". An indication of the course of the brook in a clearing area also includes the derivation of "*laz/6nica" to "lazъ" "grubbing, repented, bright patch in the forest".

=== Early history ===
The area around Laßnitzhöhe was once part of the Western Roman Empire, after its collapse in 476 AD the Roman provincial population largely withdrew.

=== Middle Ages ===
While much of the east of Styria already in the first half of the 12th century was enriched with villages and settlements, settlement took place in the area of Laßnitzhöhe first in the second half of the century.

In the 16th century large parts of today's municipal area were incorporated by the Baden contract or by inheritance into the German Order. The order remained until the year 1848 landlord of the then-called Wöbling territory.

=== Modern times ===
After the Revolution of 1848 occurred in Austria a modernization of administration were established. District and municipal administrations were introduced. This led to pooling smaller communities into the greater community of Laßnitzhöhe in 1951.

=== Railway ===
Mid-1850s in Graz a "consortium" was founded to the plant and the construction of the then so-called "railroad locomotive", today's Steirische Ostbahn (Styria Eastern Railway), between Graz and Győr (then Raab).
Three routings were considered:

- 1 Graz - Gleisdorf - Ilz - Fürstenfeld - Hungarian border
- 2 Graz - Autal - Nestelbach - Gleisdorf - Studenzen - Feldbach - Fehring - Hungarian border
- 3 Graz - Schemerlberg - Laßnitztal - Gleisdorf - Feldbach - Fehring - Hungarian border.

It was initially decided to proceed with option 2, but farmers and landowners in the area of Nestelbach placed inter alia with the argument that "the locomotives would burn their fields" and obtained a change to option 3. May 1, 1873 saw the opening of the line.

=== History as a spa ===
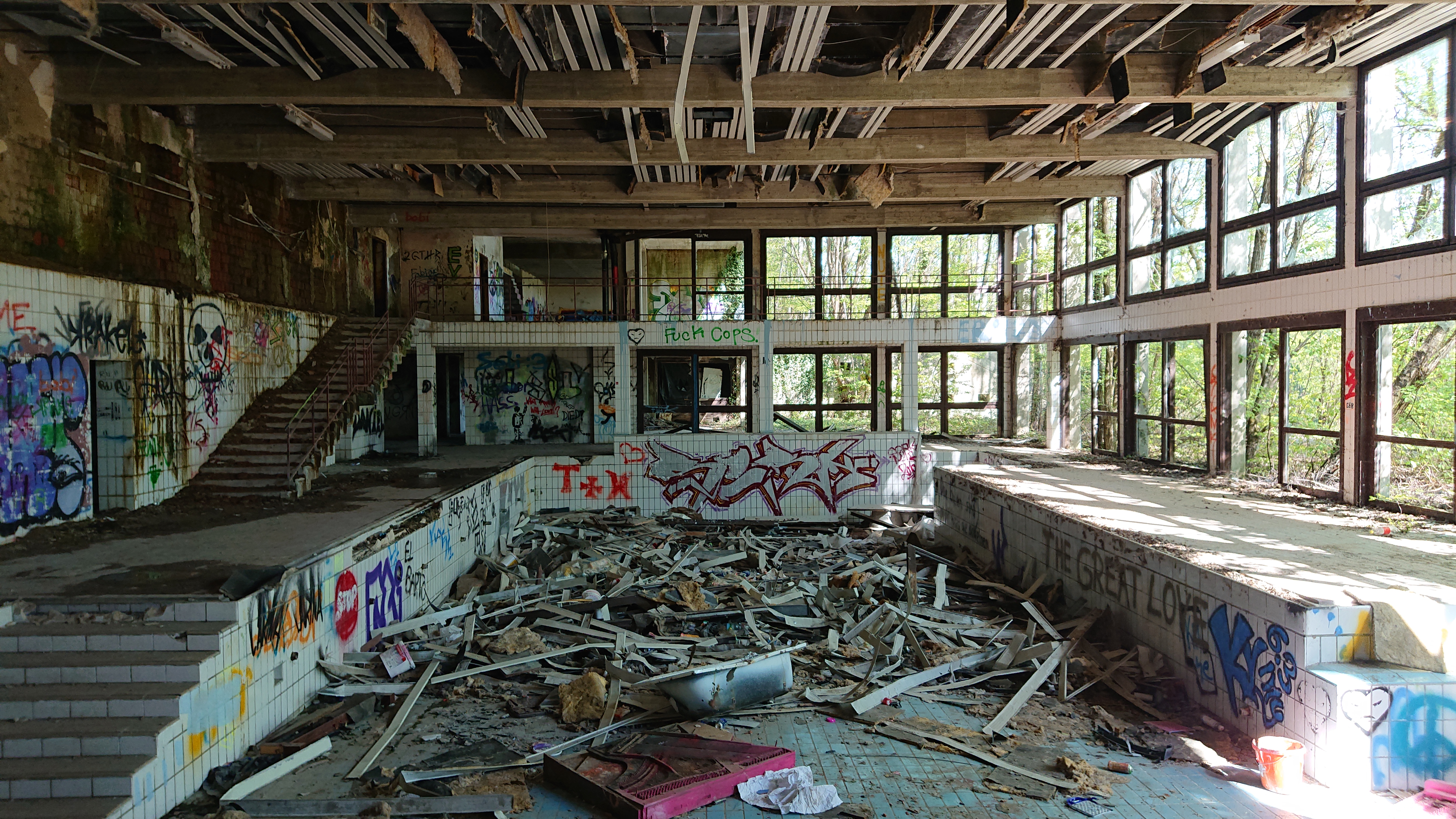
Abandoned swimming pool, built in 1974 but never opened

Due to the easy accessibility Dr. Huber from Graz decided to build a guesthouse and several villas in Laßnitzhöhe for recovery of guests during summertime. Around the start of the 20th century a cooperative acquired the buildings and converted them in 1901 to the at the time most modern hospitals of Styria. Main priority was the treatment of "nervous diseases of all types" such as paralysis and convulsions and pain such as migraine and sciatica.

After the World Wars it was difficult for the spa treatment to regain the "golden age" before 1914. Many guests from the former territories of the monarchy fell away and so in the main guests from Vienna and Graz stayed. After extensive reconstruction and renovation measures, the hospital was conducted from 1991 to 2003 as a sanatorium. After a recent renovation the former hospital, now the "Private Clinic Laßnitzhöhe", is one of the most modern hospitals in Austria. Priorities of care are in addition to internal medicine and dermatology in neurological and orthopedic rehabilitation.

=== Recent past ===
In 1995, Laßnitzhöhe was elected the most beautiful flower village in Styria and after the appointment to a market town in 1999 the market town was entitled as the most beautiful flower market town of Styria in 2006. Back in 2005 Laßnitzhöhe was second most beautiful flower market town. In 2001 community and sports clubs celebrated its 50th anniversary and spa Laßnitzhöhe the 100-year anniversary. In 2002 the Trachtenkapelle Laßnitzhöhe looked back on 50 years since its foundation, which was celebrated with the blessing of the flag for the local chapel. And the parish Laßnitzhöhe could celebrate the blessing of two new church bells. In summer 2007, after a short rebuilding time the redesigned marketplace was given to the public. In 2008, a local heating network was built within the community. In April 2009, the Gasthaus Kotzian (Kotzian inn) was demolished. In 2010 a building was built there with apartments with underground parking and restaurant and space for a new village hall and the local Raiffeisen bank and several shops.

== Parish Laßnitzhöhe ==
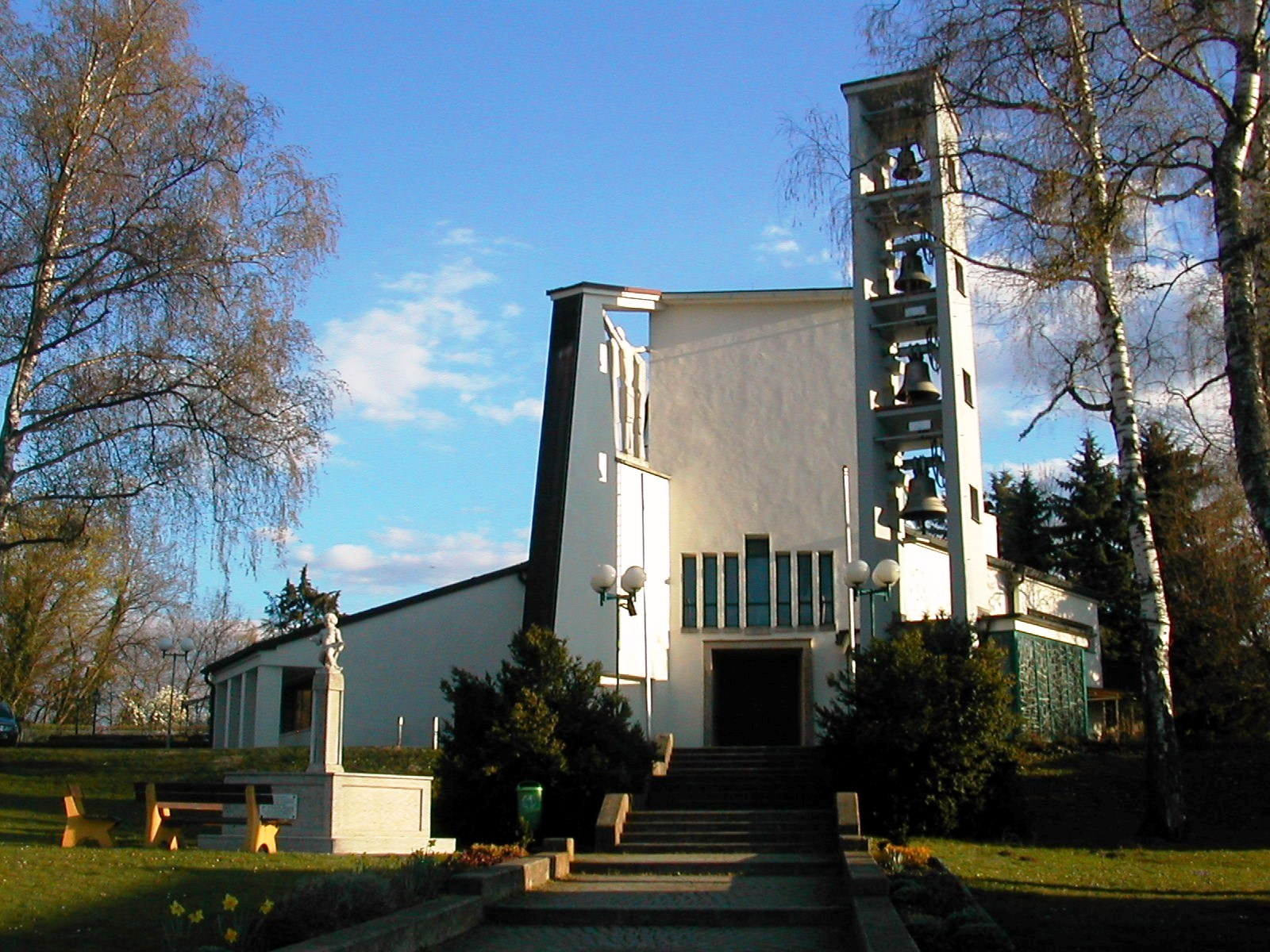
Laßnitzhöhe parish church

On a plot of land next to the main square provided by Eduard Miglitz on 13 August 1961 the foundation stone was laid for the church designed by the architect Robert Kramreiter-Klein. After a short construction time, the church was dedicated by Rev. John Kogler on 14 July 1963. Official name of the church is "Roman Catholic parish of Christ's birth in Laßnitzhöhe". The facilities of the church include the Cross of Christ the King by Othmar Klemencics and the glass paintings of the Baptistery by Rudolf Szyszkowitz. The Stations of the Cross pictures of Prof. Schmidsfelden are on loan from the family Schmid-Schmidsfelden. The concrete glass windows are taken from a design by Rudolf Szyszkowitz and the organ built in 1971 by the company Walcker-Mayer.
