= Kreischa =

- Municipality
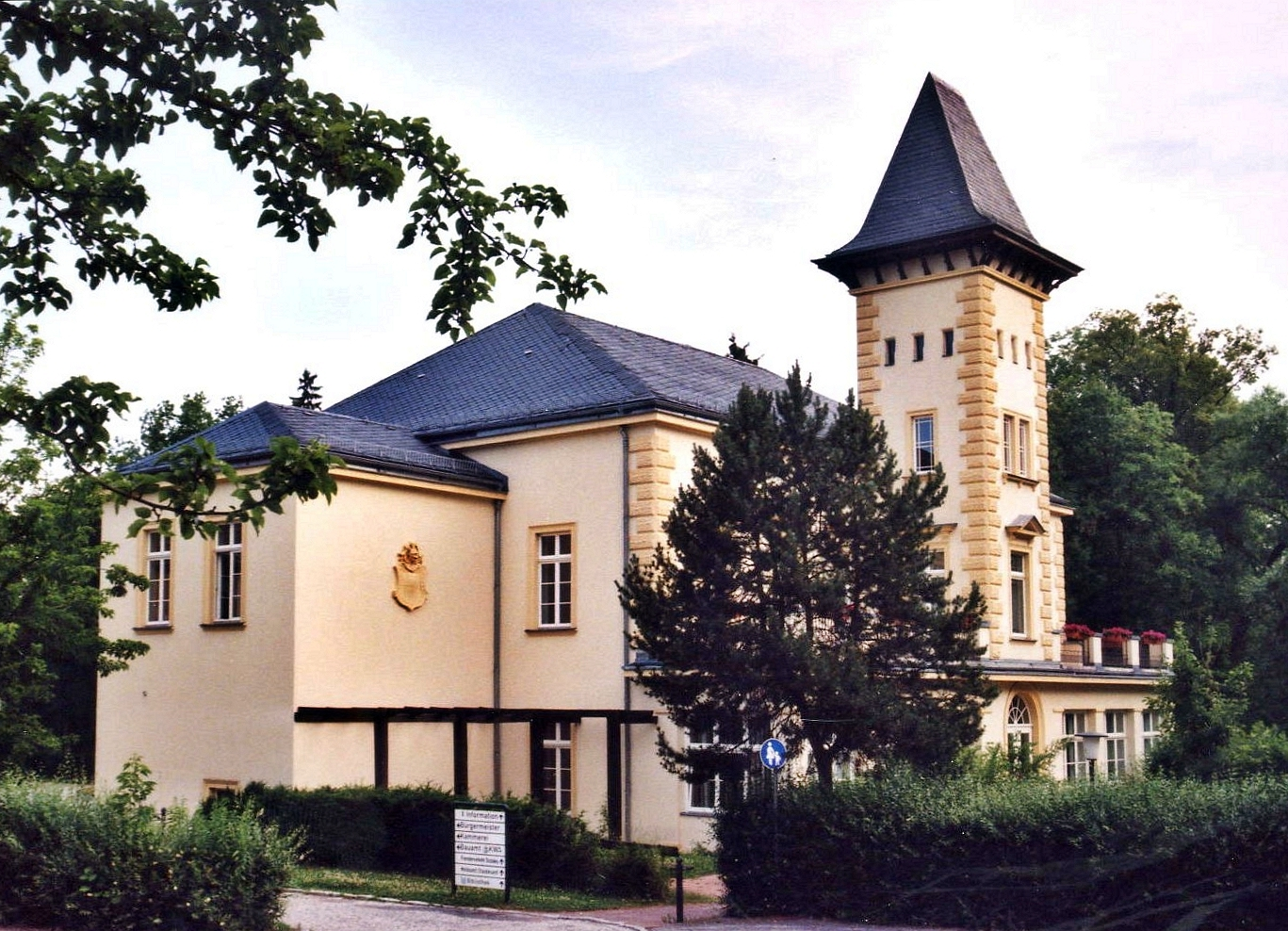
- Town hall

- Coat of arms

- Location of Kreischa within Sächsische Schweiz-Osterzgebirge district
- Interactive map of Kreischa
- Location within Germany Location within Saxony
- Coordinates: 50°57′N 13°46′E
- Country: Germany
- State: Saxony
- District: Sächsische Schweiz-Osterzgebirge
- Subdivisions: 14

Government
  - Mayor (2022–29): Frank Schöning

Area
  - Total: 28.97 km^{2} (11.19 sq mi)
- Elevation: 257 m (843 ft)

Population (2025-12-31)
  - Total: 4,587
  - Density: 158.3/km^{2} (410.1/sq mi)
- Time zone: UTC+01:00 (CET)
  - Summer (DST): UTC+02:00 (CEST)
- Postal codes: 01731
- Dialling codes: 035206
- Vehicle registration: PIR
- Website: www.kreischa.de

Kreischa is a municipality in the Sächsische Schweiz-Osterzgebirge district, Saxony, Germany. It directly borders the Saxon capital Dresden and consists of 14 districts.

Kreischa was first mentioned in 1282 in the name Heinricus de Kryschowe. The name could be derived from an Old Slavic word meaning "crooked" or "lame".

== Sister cities ==
Kreischa is twinned with:

- Loffenau district Rastatt, Baden-Württemberg, Germany since 1990

== Municipality subdivisions ==
- Babisnau
- Bärenklause
- Brösgen
- Gombsen
- Kautzsch
- Kleba
- Kleincarsdorf
- Lungkwitz
- Quohren
- Saida
- Sobrigau
- Theisewitz
- Kreischa-Wittgensdorf
- Zscheckwitz

== See also ==
- Babisnau poplar
