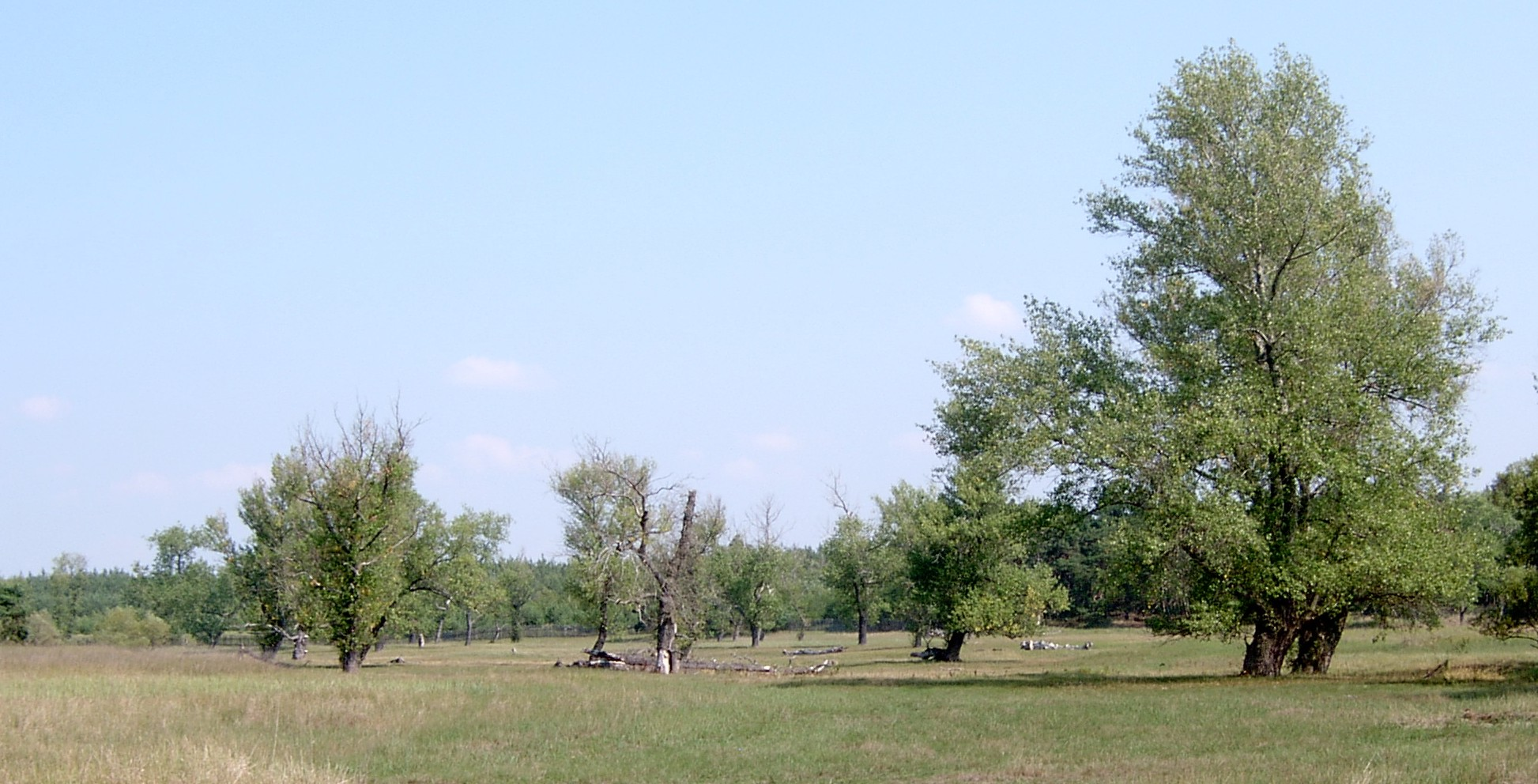
- Black poplars in Poland

Conservation status
- Data Deficient (IUCN 3.1)

- Secure (NatureServe)

Scientific classification
- Kingdom: Plantae
- Clade: Embryophytes
- Clade: Tracheophytes
- Clade: Angiosperms
- Clade: Eudicots
- Clade: Rosids
- Order: Malpighiales
- Family: Salicaceae
- Genus: Populus
- Section: Populus sect. Aigeiros
- Species: P. nigra

Binomial name
- Populus nigra L.
- Distribution map

= Populus nigra =

Black poplar

Species of plant

Populus nigra, the black poplar, is a species of cottonwood poplar, the type species of section Aigeiros of the genus Populus, native to Europe, southwest and central Asia, and northwest Africa.

== Description ==
Black poplars are medium- to large-sized deciduous trees, reaching 20–30 m, and rarely 40 m tall. Their leaves are diamond-shaped to triangular, 5–8 cm long and 6–8 cm broad, and green on both surfaces. Normally, their trunks achieve up to 1.5 m in diameter, but some unusual individual trees in France have grown old enough to have much larger trunks – more than 3 metres DBH (Diameter at Breast Height).

The species is dioecious (male and female flowers are on different plants), with flowers in catkins and pollination achieved by the wind. The black poplar grows in low-lying areas of moist ground. Like most other pioneer species, the tree is characterized by rapid growth and is able to colonize open areas quickly.

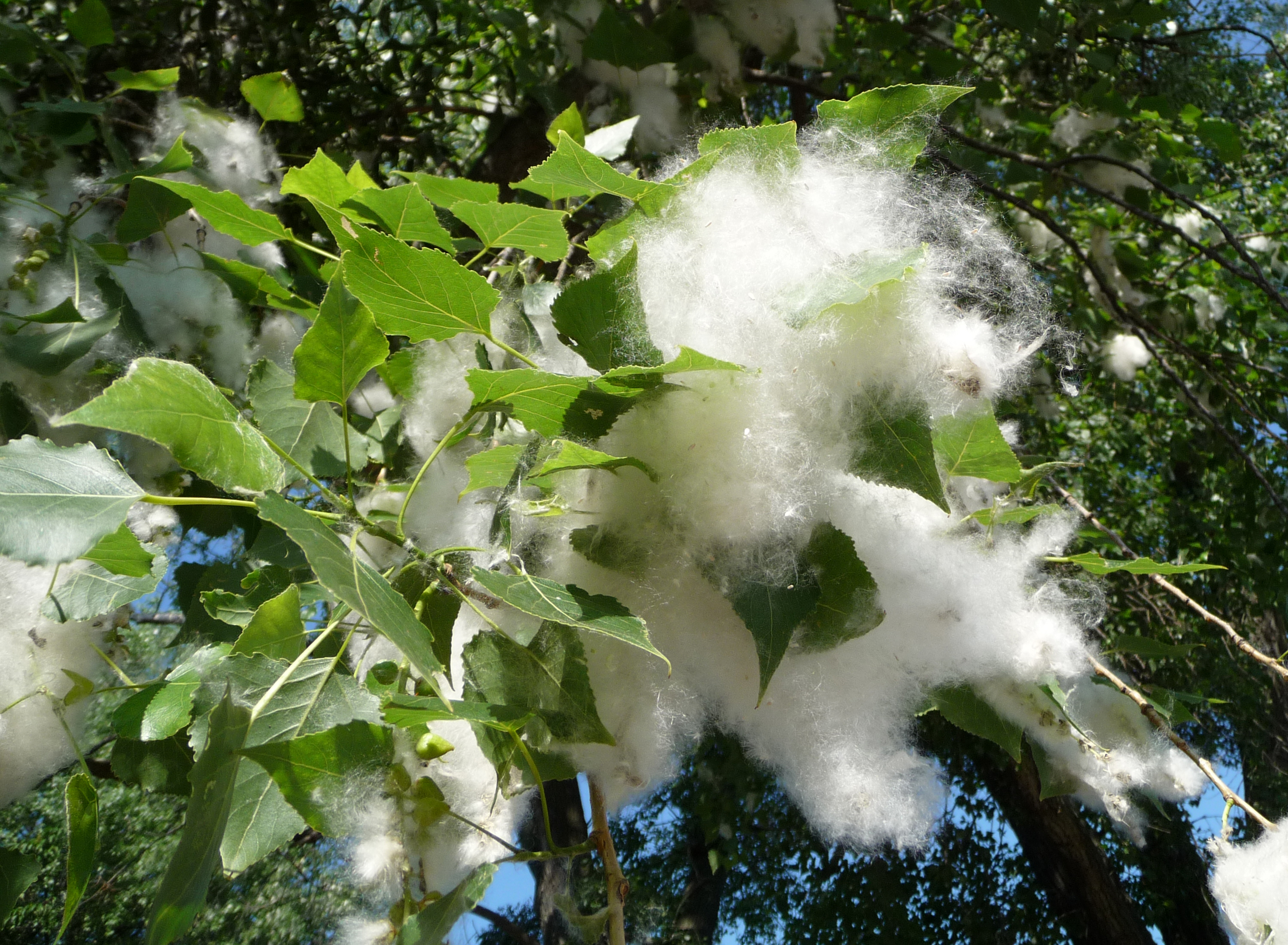
Poplar seed tufts

=== Subspecies ===
Three subspecies are established and some botanists distinguish a fourth:

- P. n. subsp. nigra. Central and eastern Europe. Leaves and shoots glabrous (hairless); bark grey-brown, thick and furrowed.

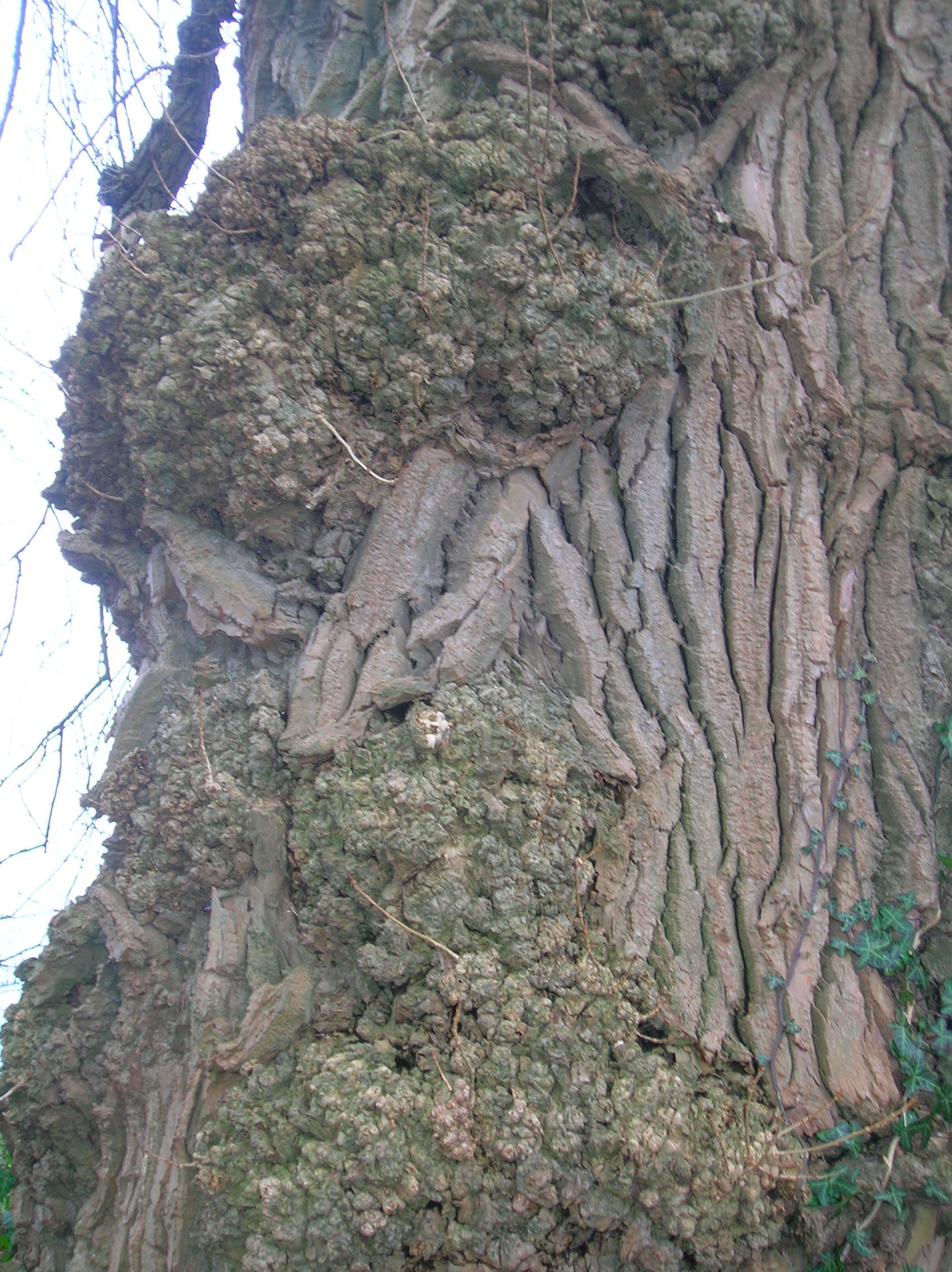
Burrs and normal bark on a black poplar tree (subspecies betulifolia) in Ayrshire, Scotland.

- P. n. subsp. betulifolia (Pursh) W.Wettst. North-west Europe (France, Great Britain, Ireland). Leaf veins and shoots finely downy; bark grey-brown, thick and furrowed, often with heavy burrs, trunk usually heavily leaning.
- P. n. subsp. caudina (Ten.) Bugała. Mediterranean region, also southwest Asia if var. afghanica not distinguished.
- P. n. var. afghanica Aitch. & Hemsl. (syn. P. n. var. thevestina (Dode) Bean). Southwest Asia; treated as a cultivar of P. nigra by many botanists, and as a distinct species P. afghanica by others; bark smooth, nearly white; leaves and shoots as subsp. caudina (see also cultivars, below).

The subspecies P. n. betulifolia is one of the rarest trees in Great Britain and Ireland, with only about 7,000 trees known, of which only about 600 have been confirmed as female.

=== Cultivars ===
Several cultivars have also been selected, these being propagated readily by cuttings:

- 'Italica' was originally selected in Lombardy, northern Italy, in the 17th century. The growth is fastigiate (having the branches more or less parallel to the main stem), with a very narrow crown. Common in the Mediterranean region, it is adapted to hot, dry summers and grows poorly in humid conditions, being short-lived due to fungal diseases. It is a male clone. Around 40 to 50 years, this short-lived variety starts shedding branches and is very likely to be blown over in high winds, each successive tree lost exposing neighbouring trees, creating a domino effect.

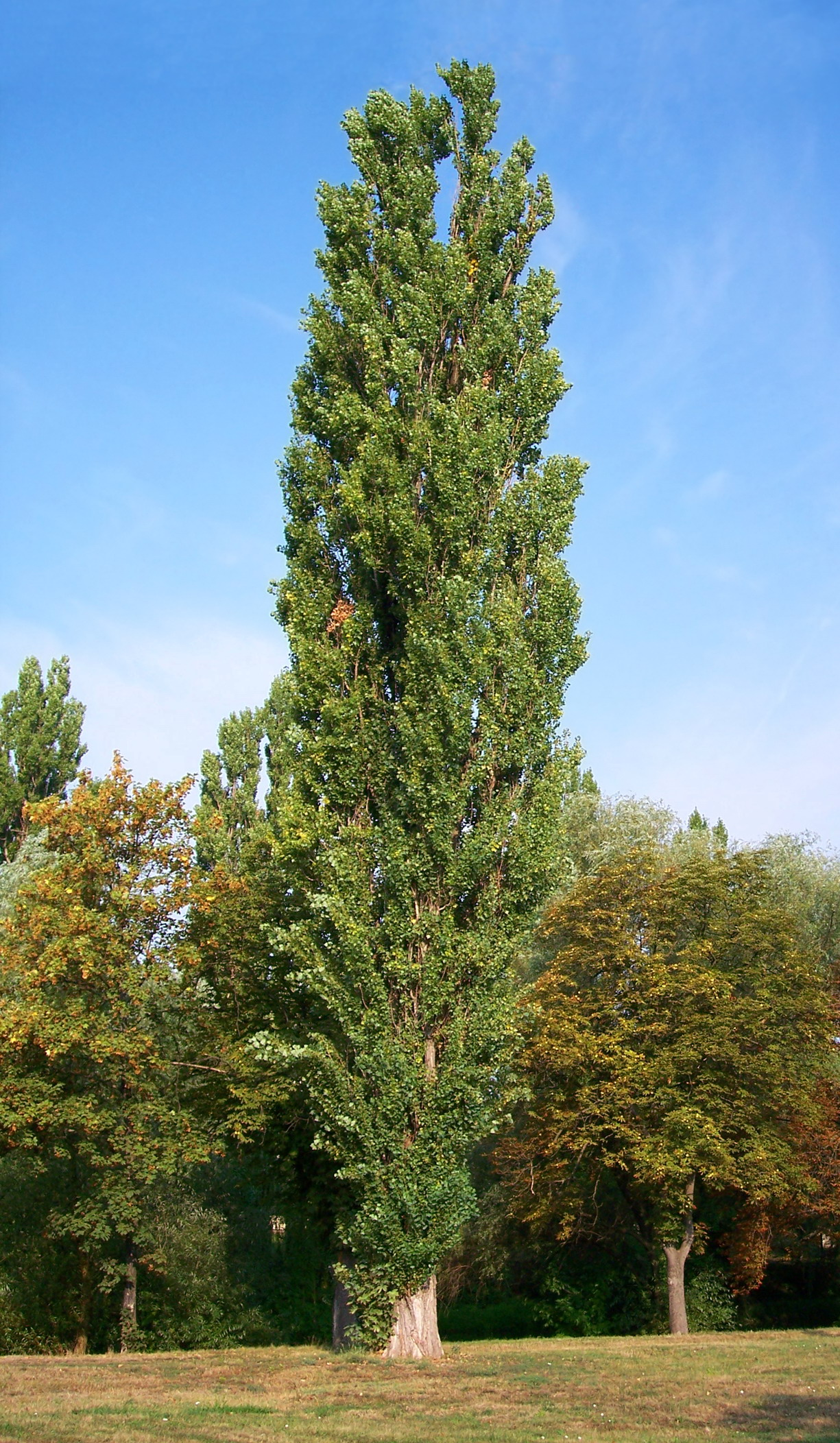
A fastigiate black poplar cultivar of the Plantierensis group, in Hungary

- Plantierensis group clones are derived by crossing 'Italica' with P. nigra ssp. betulifolia at the Plantières Nursery near Metz in France in 1884; they are similar to 'Italica' (and often mistaken for it), but with a slightly broader crown, and better adapted to the cool, humid climate of northwest Europe, where the true Lombardy poplar does not grow well. Both male and female clones are grown. This is the tree most commonly grown in Great Britain and Ireland as Lombardy poplar.
- 'Manchester' is a cultivar of P. nigra subsp. betulifolia widely planted in northwest England. It is a male clone, and currently seriously threatened by poplar scab disease.
- 'Gigantea' is another fastigiate clone, of unknown origin, with a rather broader, more vigorous crown than 'Italica'. It is a female clone.
- 'Afghanica' (syn. 'Thevestina'): most, if not all, specimens are of a single clone, and many botanists therefore treat it as a cultivar rather than a botanical variety. It is fastigiate, similar to 'Italica', but with a striking whitish bark; it also differs from 'Italica' in being a female clone. This is the common fastigiate poplar in southwest Asia and southeast Europe (the Balkans), where it was introduced during the Ottoman Empire period.

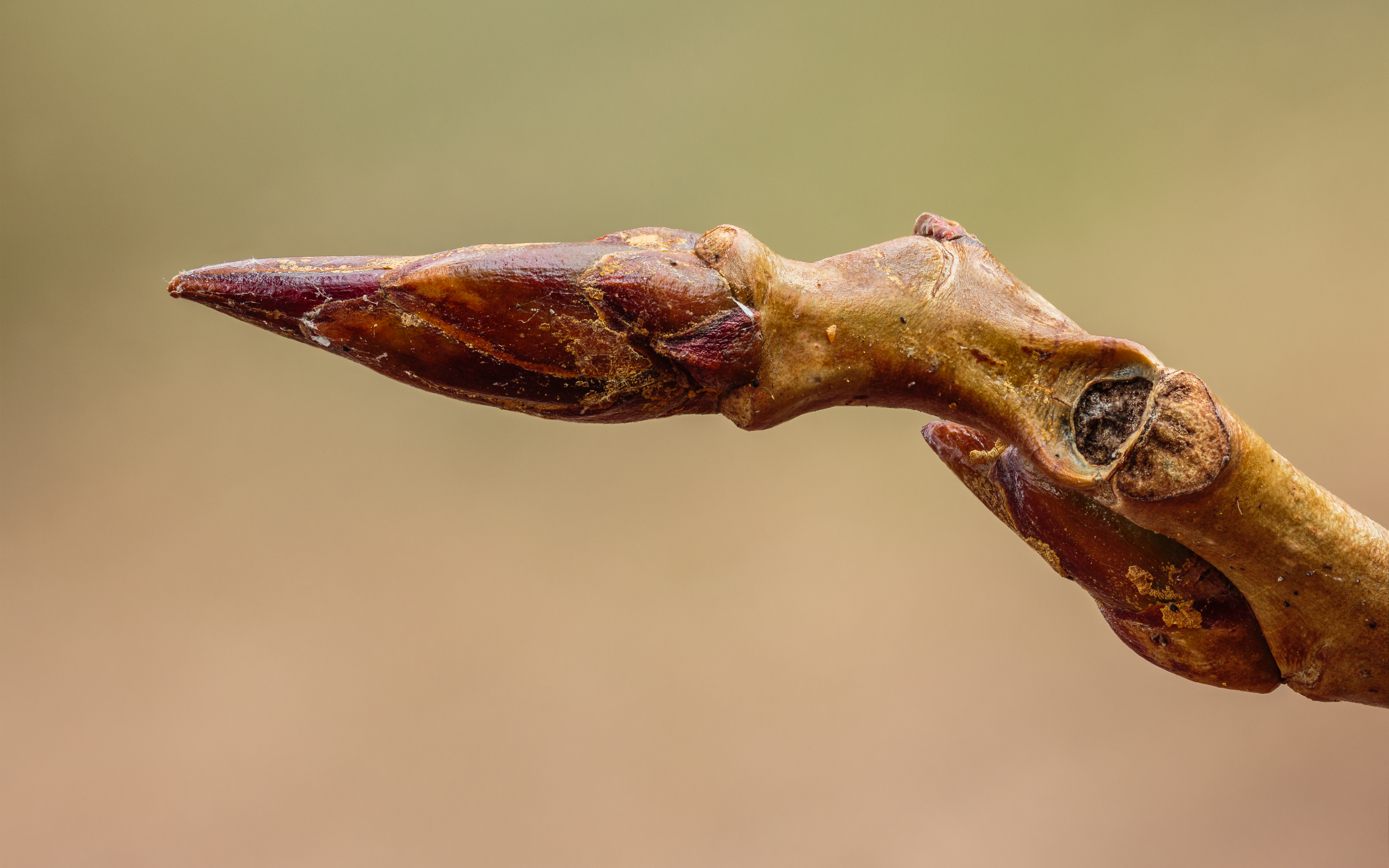
Bud development of a branch of a (Populus nigra) until February 8th.

== Distribution ==
Black poplar has a large distribution area throughout Europe and is also found in northern Africa and central and west Asia. The distribution area extends from the Mediterranean in the south to around 64° latitude in the north and from the British Isles in the west to Kazakhstan and China in the east. The distribution area also includes the Caucasus and large parts of the Middle East.

== See also ==
- The Green Cathedral
- Babisnau poplar
