= Studenzen =

- Former municipality
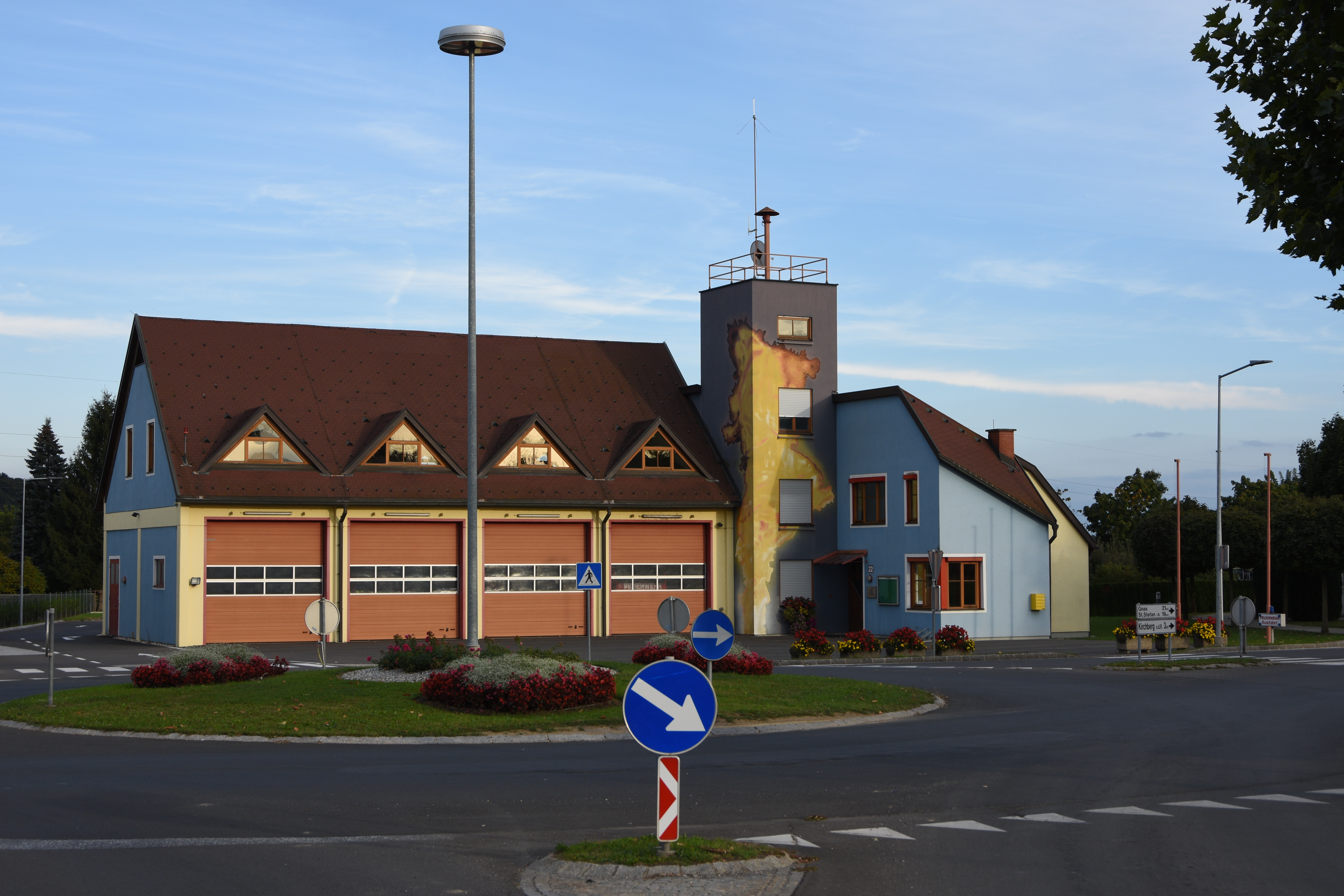
- Fire station in Studenzen

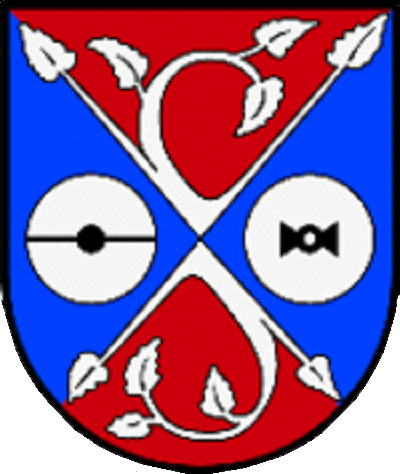
- Coat of arms

- Location within Austria
- Coordinates: 47°00′00″N 15°45′00″E
- Country: Austria
- State: Styria
- District: Südoststeiermark

Area
  - Total: 5.92 km^{2} (2.29 sq mi)
- Elevation: 310 m (1,020 ft)

Population (1 January 2016)
  - Total: 693
  - Density: 117/km^{2} (303/sq mi)
- Time zone: UTC+1 (CET)
  - Summer (DST): UTC+2 (CEST)
- Postal code: 8322
- Area code: +43 3115
- Vehicle registration: FB
- Website: www.studenzen.gv.at

Studenzen is a former municipality in the district of Südoststeiermark in the Austrian state of Styria. Since the 2015 Styria municipal structural reform, it is part of the municipality Kirchberg an der Raab.

== Population ==
Historical population
Year	Pop.	±%
1869	505	—
1880	461	−8.7%
1890	481	+4.3%
1900	463	−3.7%
1910	483	+4.3%
1923	483	+0.0%
1934	498	+3.1%
1939	505	+1.4%
1951	542	+7.3%
1961	549	+1.3%
1971	532	−3.1%
1981	629	+18.2%
1991	668	+6.2%
2001	681	+1.9%
2013	695	+2.1%
