= Dresden Mitte station =

Railway station in Dresden, Germany

Dresden Mitte
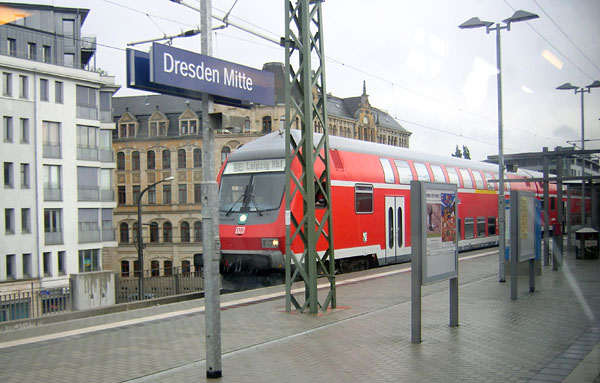

General information
- Location: Dresden, Saxony; Germany
- Coordinates: 51.056297°N 13.724275°E
- Lines: Děčín–Dresden-Neustadt (km 64.688); Pirna–Coswig (km 19.262)
- Platforms: 4

Construction
- Accessible: Yes

Other information
- Station code: 1345
- DS100 code: DM
- IBNR: 8013444
- Category: 4
- Website: www.bahnhof.de

History
- Opened: 1 October 1897
Services
Preceding station	DB Regio Nordost	Following station
Dresden Hbf Terminus	RE 15	Dresden-Neustadt towards Hoyerswerda
Dresden Hbf Terminus	RE 18	Dresden-Neustadt towards Cottbus Hbf
Preceding station	DB Regio Südost	Following station
Dresden Hbf Terminus	RE 50	Dresden-Neustadt towards Dresden Hbf
Preceding station	Trilex	Following station
Dresden Hbf Terminus	RE 1	Dresden-Neustadt towards Zgorzelec
Dresden Hbf Terminus	RE 2	Dresden-Neustadt towards Liberec
Dresden Hbf Terminus	RB 60	Dresden-Neustadt towards Görlitz
Dresden Hbf Terminus	RB 61	Dresden-Neustadt towards Zittau
Preceding station	Dresden S-Bahn	Following station
Dresden Freiberger Straße towards Schöna	S 1	Dresden-Neustadt towards Meißen Triebischtal
Dresden Freiberger Straße towards Pirna	S 2	Dresden-Neustadt towards Dresden Flughafen
Dresden Hbf Terminus	S 8	Dresden-Neustadt towards Kamenz (Sachs)
Location

Dresden Mitte (centre) station is a regional station in central Dresden. The station, which was opened in 1897 as Wettiner Straße, is located on the connecting line between Dresden Hauptbahnhof and Dresden-Neustadt station. It has been proposed as the location of a new Dresden central train station several times. Train services are operated by DB Regio Nordost, DB Regio Südost, and Vogtlandbahn.

== Location ==
The Dresden Mitte station is located close to Dresden's Old Town about 500 metres west of the Dresden Zwinger on the border between the districts of Wilsdruffer Vorstadt and Friedrichstadt. In the immediate vicinity are the Internationales Congress Center Dresden, the former cigarette factory Yenidze, the Hochschule für Musik Carl Maria von Weber (college of music) in the former Wettiner Gymnasium (school) and the Ostragehege, which contains the Messe Dresden (exhibition ground) and various sports facilities. The planned new venue for the Staatsoperette Dresden (Dresden State Operetta) is also located near the station on the site of the former central power plant.

== History ==
=== History and construction ===
The original railway construction in Dresden followed no master plan. Rather, each private railway company built its own station as a terminus of its long-distance operations, so that there were four different poorly-linked long-distance stations in Dresden in 1875. In addition, the many level crossings created major traffic problems. By the late 1880s, all railways to Dresden had been nationalised and it was decided to fundamentally restructure the Dresden railway node. Under the leadership of building manager Otto Klette, it was agreed that this would involve the creation of a new central train station, but for a long time a consensus could not be reached on the site. After the Elbe flood in March 1845, the inspector of surveys Karl Pressler had suggested the relocation of the Weißeritz near Cotta so that the former riverbed could be used for a Dresden central station. This plan was taken up and the former riverbed was used for a connection line between the Dresden railway stations, but instead of a central station, a simple station for suburban services was built in the area of Wettiner Straße. The new main station (Hauptbahnhof) was instead built on the site of the former Bohemian station, due on the one hand to its proximity to Prager Straße, which became the most important shopping street of Dresden in the last quarter of the 19th century, and on the other hand because it was already the busiest station in Dresden.

From 1891 to September 1893, the Weißeritz was relocated and the current Mitte station was opened provisionally for through traffic on 1 August 1896. The inauguration of Haltestelle Wettiner Straße (Wettiner Straße halt) took place on 1 October 1897. Following the example of many Berlin S-Bahn stations, this station received a 100-metre-long and 36 metre-wide concourse that spanned all six tracks. Tracks 1 and 4 were reserved for suburban traffic and tracks 2 and 3 for long-distance through traffic. Tracks 5 and 6 were reserved for freight; trains running to the south could reach both Dresden-Friedrichstadt and the Hauptbahnhof. The station hall was flanked by four turrets ornamented with pillars, which supported the train shed. Large arched windows adorned the long sides of the train shed. Located at the entrance to the elevated tracks at street level were ticket counters, baggage handling facilities, waiting rooms and restaurants, as are found at Dresden-Neustadt station. The fact that a local railway station had such extensive facilities is an indication of its importance for professional and commercial activity.

=== Remodeling plans and demolition of the train shed ===
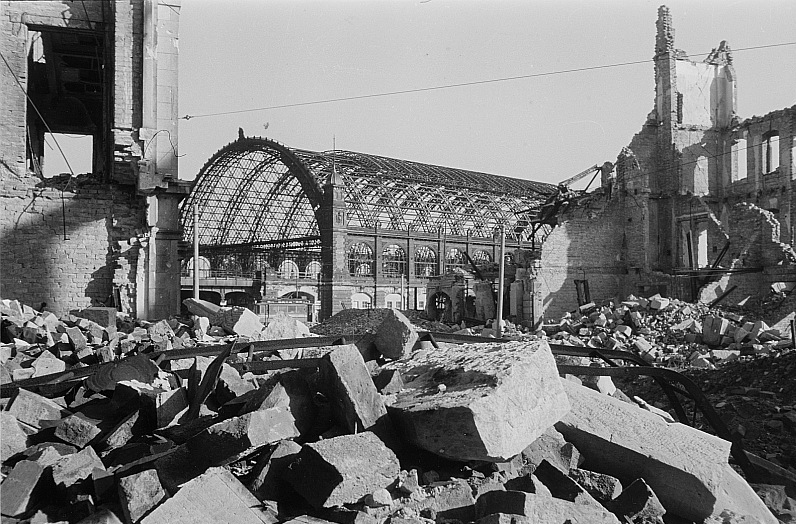
The ruined station in 1945

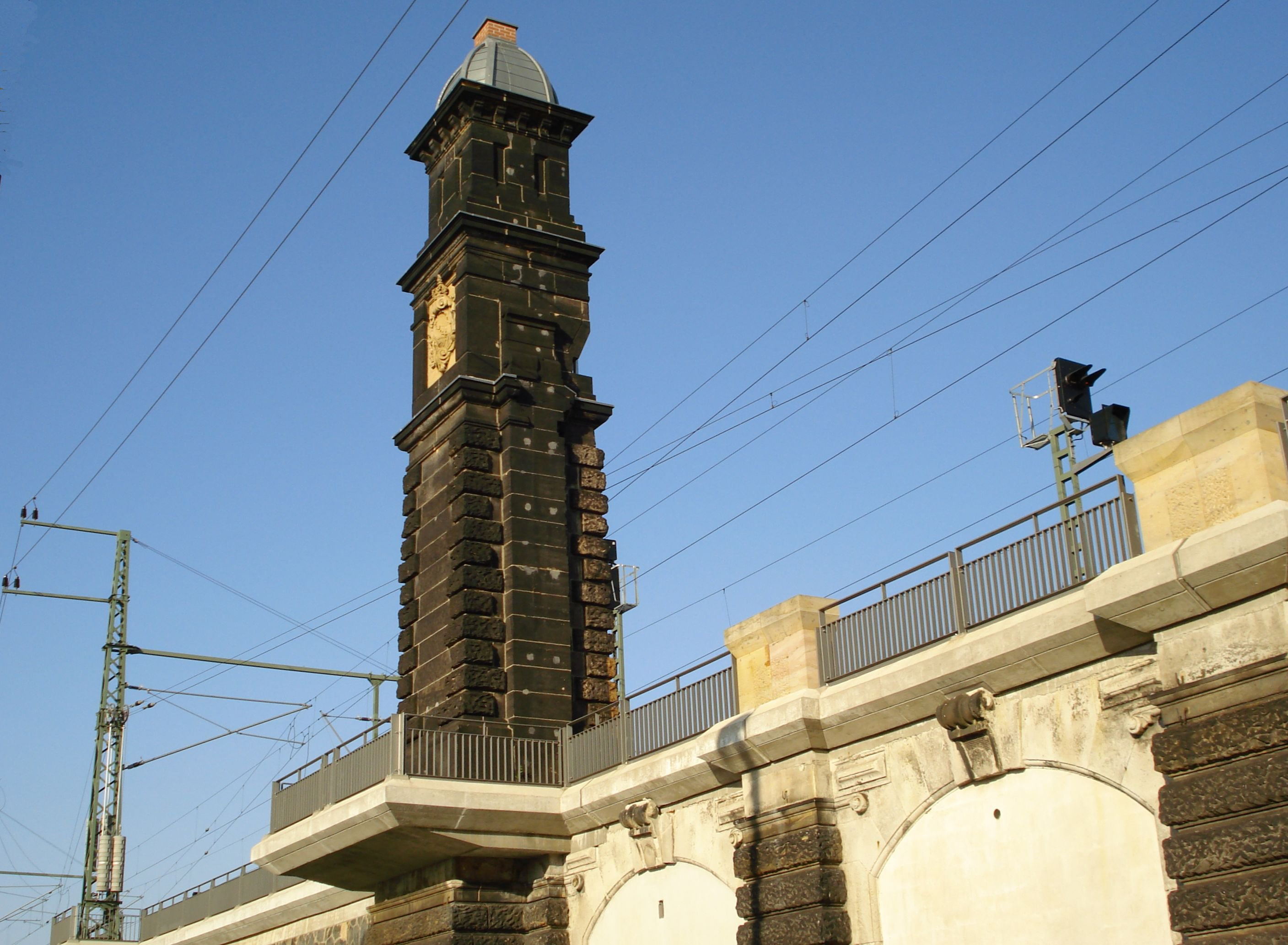
Surviving corner pylon of the former train shed

The conversion of the station into Dresden Hauptbahnhof was subsequently considered several times. In the late 1930s the Nazis planned the reconstruction of Dresden, which would have included a new central station in place of Wettiner Straße station. The proposed station would have had enormous dimensions, the new station would have been 300 metres long and 200 metres wide with an oversized courtyard and spacious streets intended for rallies and marches. Nearby between Freiberger Straße and Ehrlichstraße there would have been another area for rallies called the Reichsbahnbogen (Reichsbahn bow). With the outbreak of the Second World War, however, these plans quickly became obsolete. During the Bombing of Dresden in 1945 the structure of the train shed was greatly affected. However, the damage was not so severe that it would have justified the demolition of the train shed, including three corner pylons, that was completed in 1953. Just one of four pylons was preserved, because it contained the flue for the station's heating system.

Siemens ES64U2 departs with a train from the station Dresden-Mitte.

Previously, reconstruction of the station as a central station had been discussed again. The large-scale destruction of Dresden would have allowed a far-reaching reorganisation of the railway systems and so in 1946 and 1947 several plans were drawn up over a few years for a new generously dimensioned central station to replace the Wettiner Straße station. This would have had 17 through platform tracks and three terminal platforms and have been 400 metres-long and 186.5 metres-wide and oriented parallel with Könneritzstraße. An entrance building would have been built on the eastern side towards the centre of the old town. In successive drafts the dimensions were reduced somewhat by reducing the platform space for luggage, but the original draft was substantially maintained. A main objective of the planned restructuring of the railway node was to allow trains to run on the east–west route between Chemnitz and Görlitz without reversing in Dresden. Why these plans were not ultimately carried out, cannot be answered with certainty, however, financial problems, material shortages, labour shortages and general planning uncertainty during socio-political change are cited as possible reasons.

The previous name of the station referred to the royal House of Wettin and therefore was not considered to be consistent with the socialist system. Therefore, the station was renamed Dresden-Mitte on 20 July 1946. Little changed in the following 40 years. No platform canopies remained, but the tracks and the buildings were designed for a covered station and rainwater seeped through the inadequately sealed floor and caused a gradual decline in its condition.

=== Reconstruction after German reunification ===
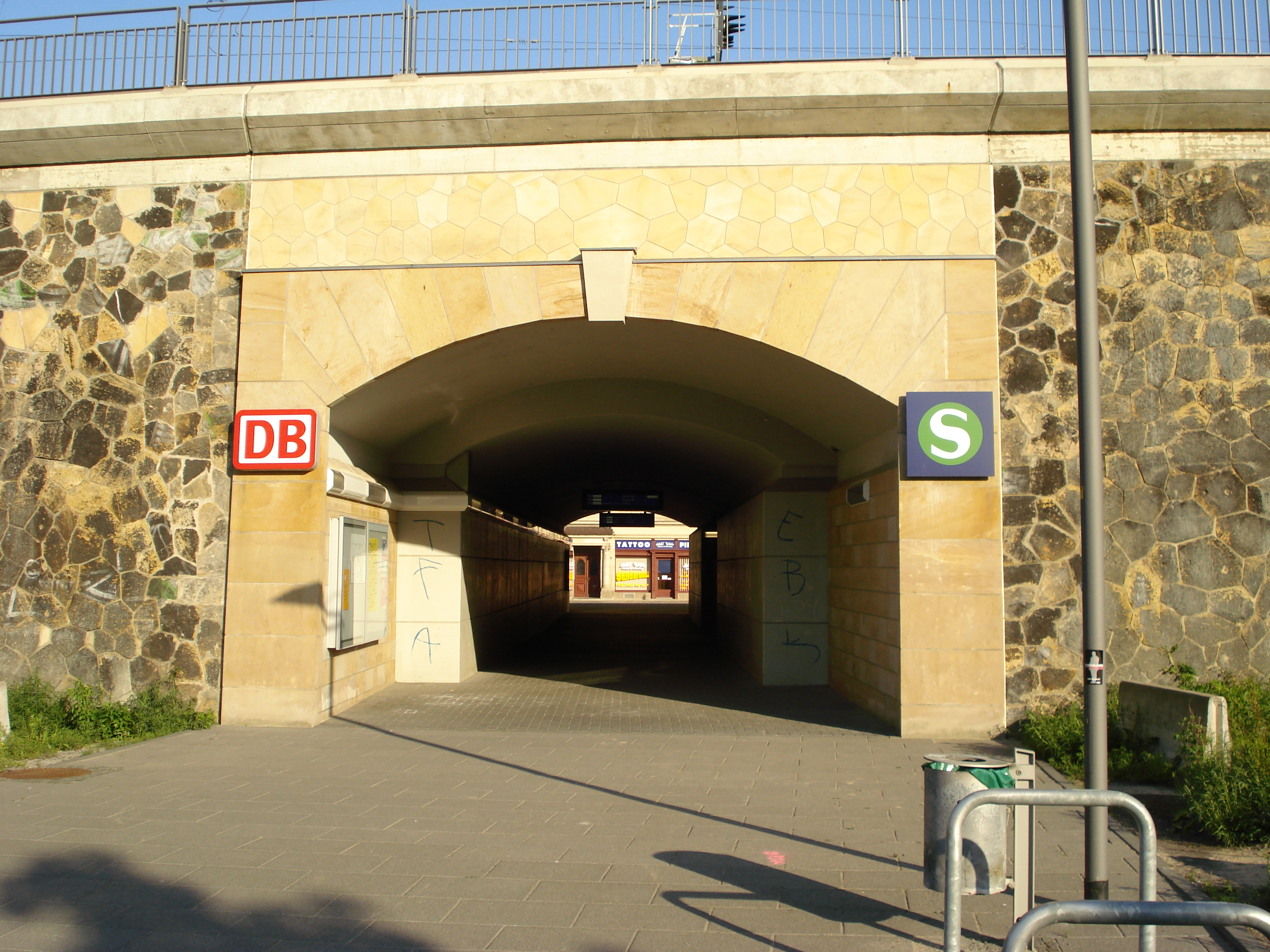
New pedestrian tunnel

After the reunification of Germany, there were initially plans for the building of a glazed concourse on two levels with shops and offices designed by Ingenhoven Architects. This proposal failed because of a lack of funds. Minor renovations took place in 1997 and Deutsche Bahn rebuilt the station from scratch from November 2001 during the reconstruction of the Leipzig–Dresden railway. Trams have run since mid-2002 under the train tracks and now stop in front of the platform at the entrance in Jahnstraße (street). The new platforms 1 and 2 were completed in January 2003 and platforms 3 and 4 in October 2004. An additional pedestrian tunnel, which had not initially been planned, was also built at the northern end of the platform in order to improve the link with the northern Friedrichstadt. A DB Service Store was opened as the first internal space in March 2005. Further expansion was expected in 2014.

The station forecourt (Bahnhofsvorplatz), which is located between the station and Weißeritzstraße, was rebuilt in 2011 for around €850,000. A 23-metre-long ribbon of granite boulders and replicas of bright red stones made of fiberglass has been created on the forecourt to commemorate the former course of the Weißeritz

== Construction ==
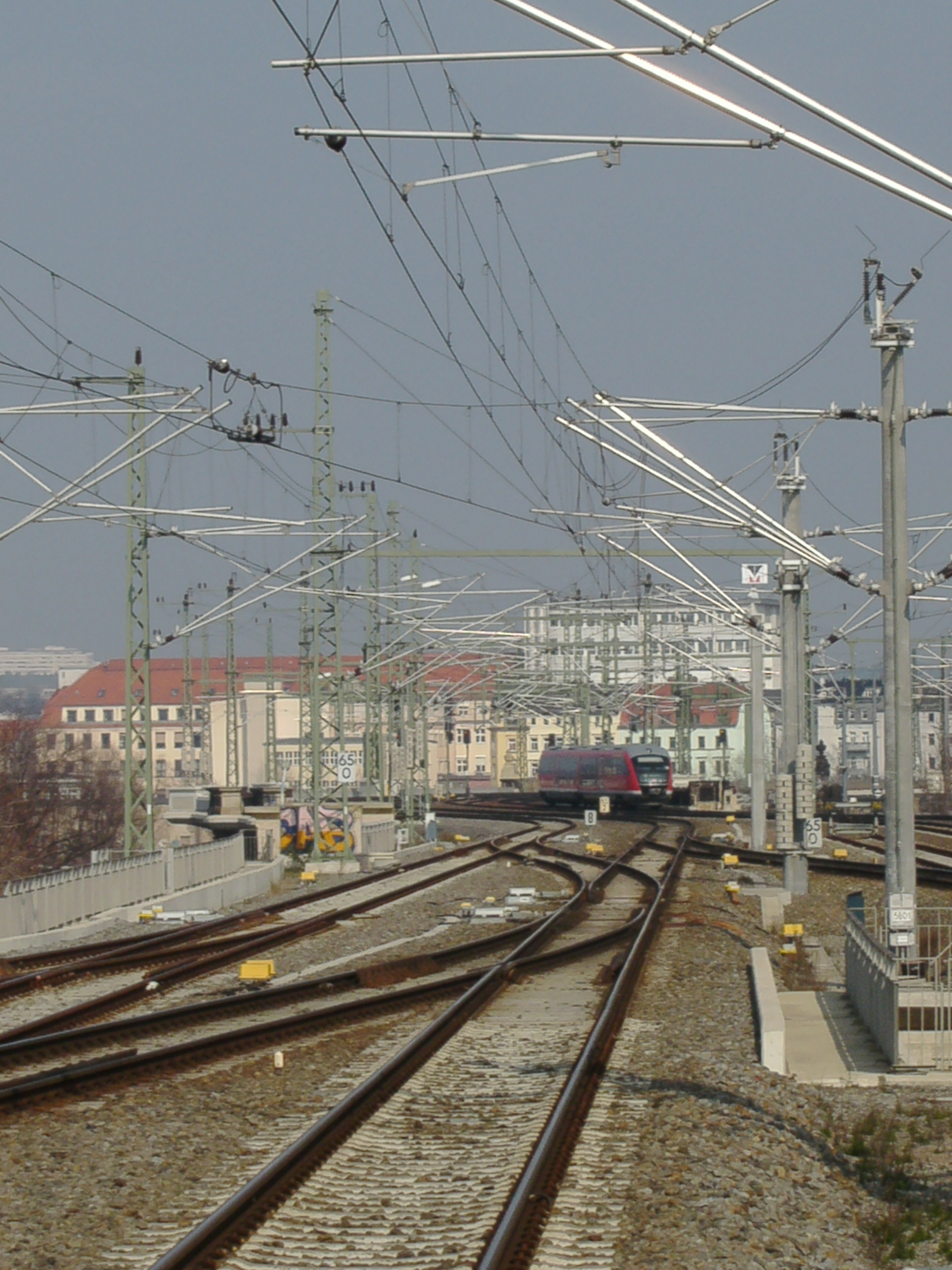
Northern track field with the exit to the Marien bridge

Dresden Mitte station is a through station with four platform edges. S-Bahn trains stop only on tracks 1 and 2. Tracks 3 and 4 are used as a stop for regional trains and for through traffic. Two other tracks on the eastern side of the station serve freight traffic. On the southern approach to the station, the line of the Berlin–Dresden Railway Company branches through the Dresden-Friedrichstadt freight yard. North of the station is the Marien bridge over the Elbe.

== Transport significance ==
Its central location within Dresden and the many interchanges possibilities at the station make it of great importance for local and regional transport. All regional trains as well as the three S-Bahn lines that run over the Dresden connecting railway stop here. There is connection to four tram lines (1, 2, 6, 10) and a bus route (94).

The station is served by the following services:

- regional express RE 1: Dresden – Bischofswerda – Bautzen – Görlitz (– Zgorzelec)
- regional express RE 2: Dresden – Bischofswerda – Ebersbach – Zittau (– Liberec)
- regional express RE 15: Dresden – Großenhain – Ruhland – Hoyerswerda
- regional express RE 18: Dresden – Großenhain – Ruhland – Cottbus
- regional express RE 50: Leipzig – Wurzen – Riesa – Coswig – Dresden
- regional service RB 60: Dresden – Bischofswerda – Bautzen – Görlitz
- regional service RB 61: Dresden – Bischofswerda – Ebersbach – Zittau
- Dresden S-Bahn S 1: Meißen Triebischtal – Dresden – Pirna – Bad Schandau – Schöna
- Dresden S-Bahn S 2: Flughafen – Dresden – Pirna
- Dresden S-Bahn S 8: Dresden − Arnsdorf – Kamenz
