= Dresden-Neustadt station =

Railway station in Dresden, Germany

Dresden Neustadt
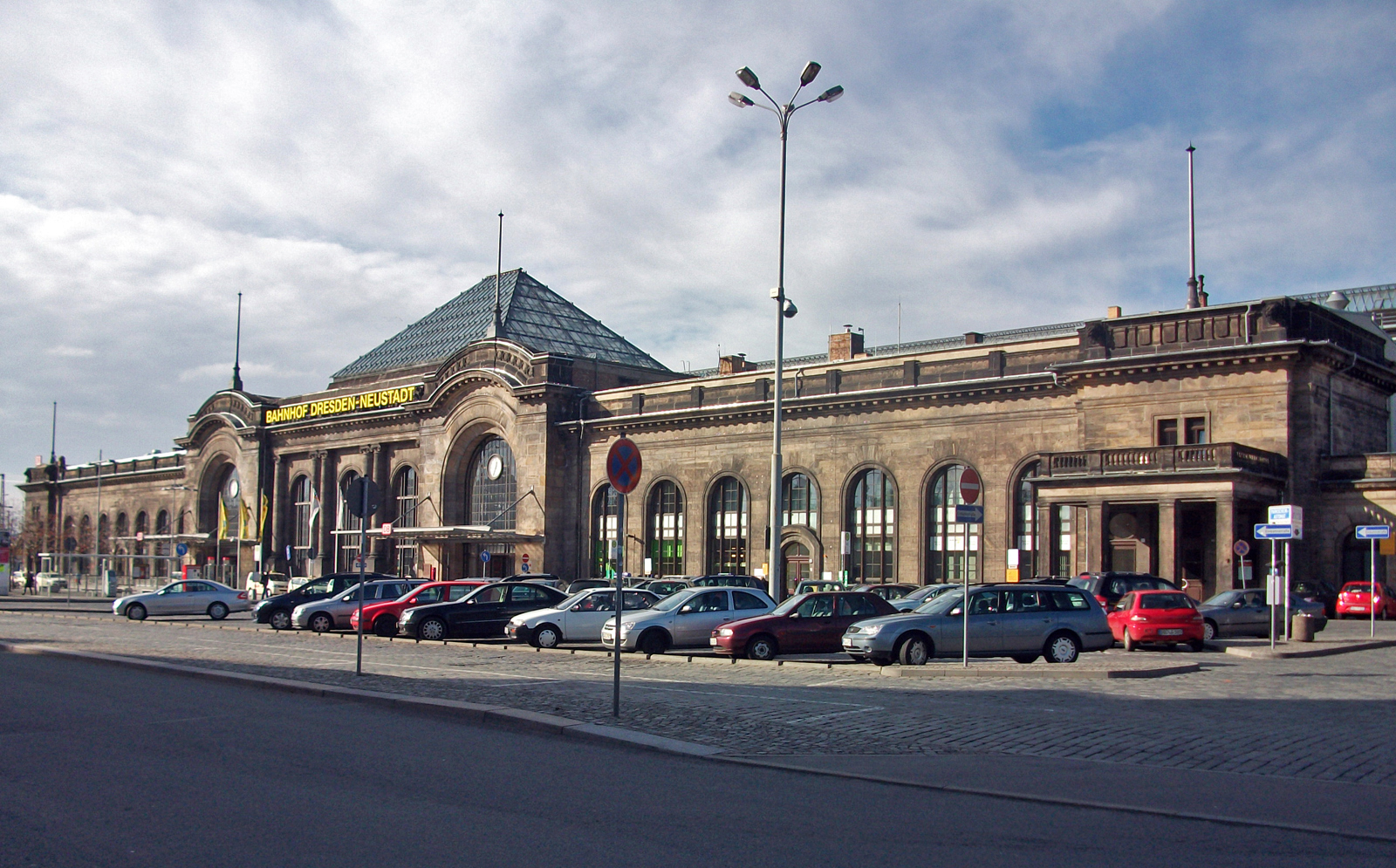

General information
- Location: Schlesischer Platz 1; 01097 Dresden, Saxony; Germany
- Coordinates: 51°3′56″N 13°44′27″E
- Lines: Leipzig–Dresden (115.936 km); Pirna–Coswig railway (S-Bahn); Děčín–Dresden-Neustadt (66.333 km); Görlitz–Dresden (102.100 km)
- Platforms: 8

Construction
- Accessible: Yes
- Architect: Otto Peters and Osmar Dürichen

Other information
- Station code: 1352
- DS100 code: DN
- IBNR: 8010089
- Category: 2
- Website: www.bahnhof.de

History
- Opened: 1 March 1901
Services
Preceding station	DB Fernverkehr	Following station
Dresden Hbf towards Chemnitz Hbf	IC 17	Elsterwerda towards Ostseebad Binz or Rostock Hbf
Berlin Südkreuz towards Hamburg-Altona	RJ 27	Dresden Hbf towards Praha hl.n., Budapest Nyugati or Wien Hbf
Berlin Südkreuz towards København H	RJ 27	Dresden Hbf towards Praha hl.n.
Berlin Südkreuz towards Kiel Hbf	RJ 27	Dresden Hbf towards Praha hl.n.
Dresden Hbf Terminus	ICE 50	Riesa towards Wiesbaden Hbf
Dresden Hbf Terminus	IC 55	Riesa towards Stuttgart Hbf
Preceding station	European Sleeper	Following station
Dresden Hbf towards Prague	Brussels - Prague	Berlin Ostbahnhof towards Brussels-South
Preceding station	DB Regio Nordost	Following station
Dresden Mitte towards Dresden Hbf	RE 15	Coswig (b Dresden) towards Hoyerswerda
Dresden Mitte towards Dresden Hbf	RE 18	Coswig (b Dresden) towards Cottbus Hbf
Preceding station	DB Regio Südost	Following station
Dresden Mitte towards Leipzig Hbf	RE 50	Radebeul Ost towards Dresden Hbf
Terminus	RB 33	Dresden Industriegelände towards Königsbrück
Preceding station	Trilex	Following station
Dresden Mitte towards Dresden Hbf	RE 1	Dresden-Klotzsche towards Zgorzelec
Dresden Mitte towards Dresden Hbf	RE 2	Dresden-Klotzsche towards Liberec
Dresden Mitte towards Dresden Hbf	RB 60	Dresden Industriegelände towards Görlitz
Dresden Mitte towards Dresden Hbf	RB 61	Dresden Industriegelände towards Zittau
Preceding station	Dresden S-Bahn	Following station
Dresden Mitte towards Schöna	S 1	Dresden Bischofsplatz towards Meißen Triebischtal
Dresden Mitte towards Pirna	S 2	Dresden Industriegelände towards Dresden Flughafen
Dresden Mitte towards Dresden Hbf	S 8	Dresden Industriegelände towards Kamenz (Sachs)
Location

Dresden-Neustadt station (German: Bahnhof Dresden-Neustadt) is the second largest railway station in the German city of Dresden after Dresden Hauptbahnhof and is also a stop for long-distance traffic. It is the junction for rail traffic on the northern side of the Elbe. It was built in 1901, replacing the Leipziger Bahnhof (Leipzig line station), which was opened in Leipziger Vorstadt in 1839, and the Schlesischen Bahnhof (Silesian line station), which was opened in 1847. The station building in the district of Innere Neustadt (inner new city) was built in the monumental style that was typical of the time, underlining its importance as a stop for long-distance services.

It is linked via the Dresden railway junction and the Dresden Hauptbahnhof (main station) to the Děčín–Dresden railway and to the tracks of the Leipzig–Dresden railway and the Görlitz–Dresden railway, which carry traffic towards Leipzig, Berlin and Upper Lusatia.

== Location ==
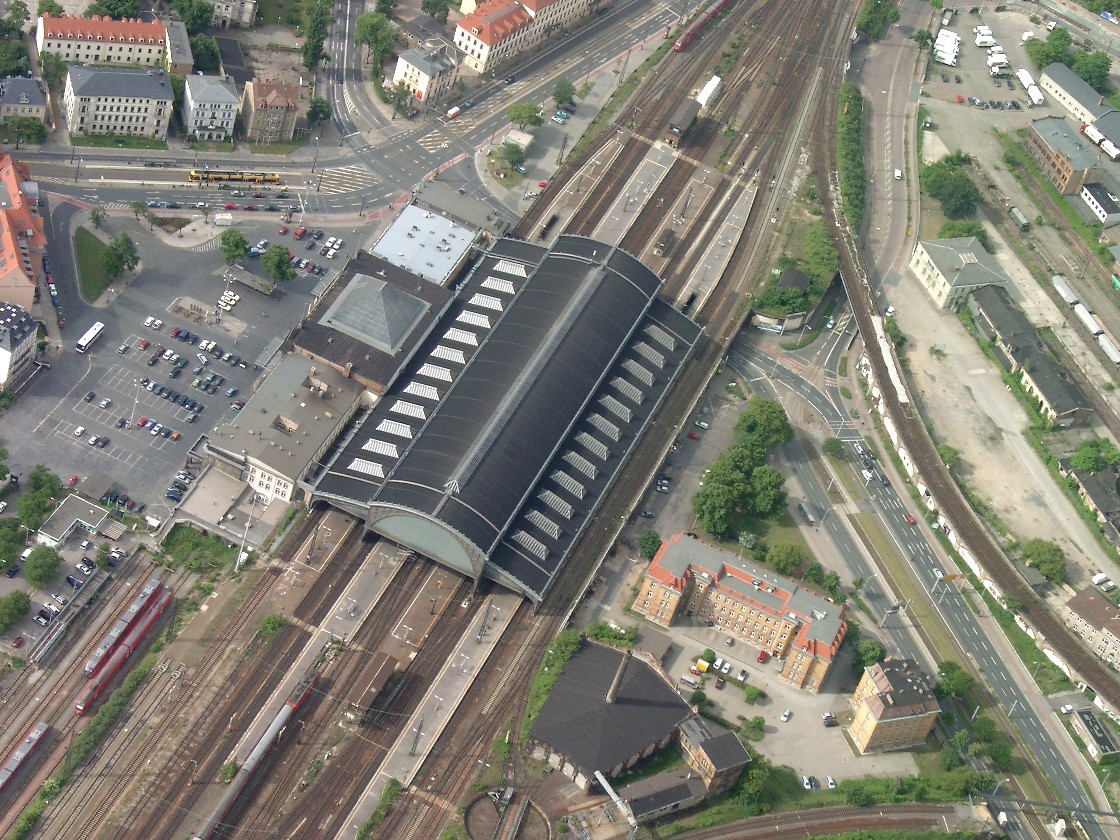
Aerial view of the station (Summer 2006)

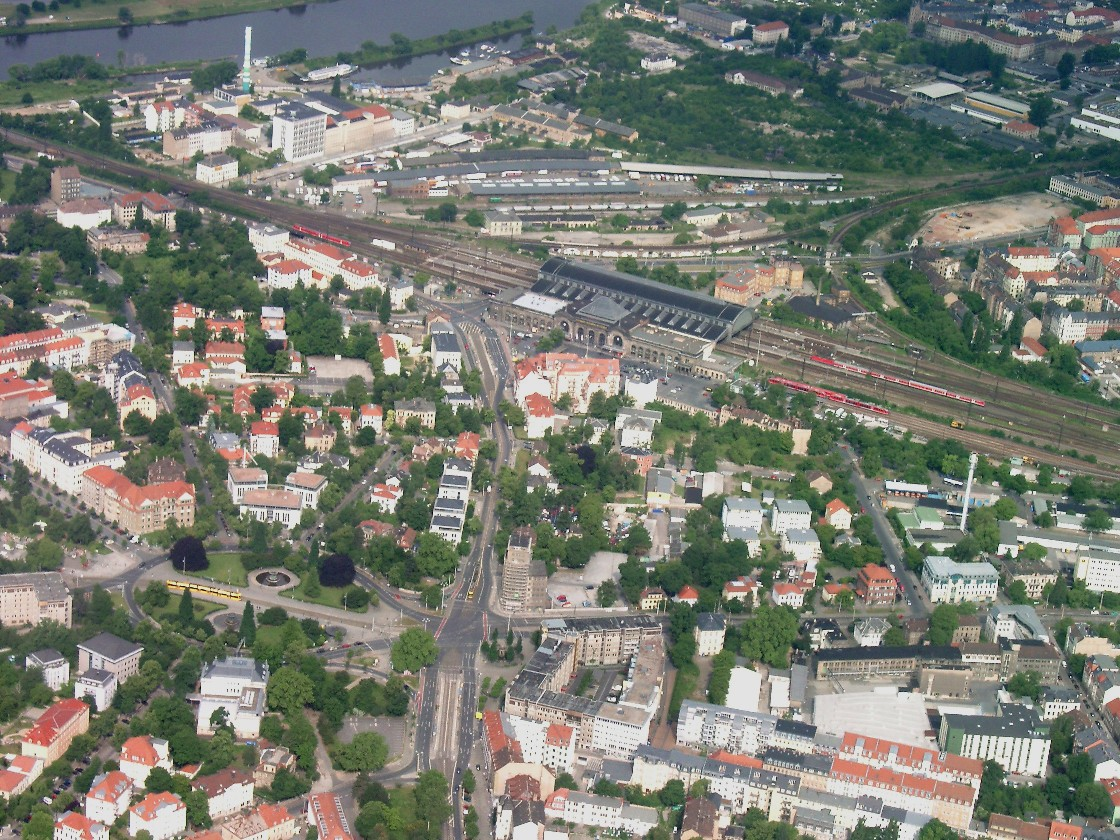
Aerial view from east to west; Albertplatz is in front of the Neustadt station building (summer of 2005)

Neustadt station is located in the Innere Neustadt, south-west of the Äußere Neustadt (outer new city) and north of the Elbe, which is crossed 600 metres away by the inner-city railway bridge, the Marienbrücke (Maria Bridge, named after Maria Anna of Bavaria). The station is not in danger of being flooded by the nearby river.

Its spacious forecourt is called the Schlesische Platz (Silesian place), referring to the Schlesischen Bahnhof, the terminus of the Görlitz–Dresden railway opened by the Sächsisch-Schlesische Eisenbahngesellschaft (Saxon-Silesian Railway Company), which was located here. Federal highway B170 (Hansastraße) runs next to it, as does the B6 (Antonstraße), which links to the major tram hub in Albertplatz, 400 metres away.

The typical German station district with a concentration of hotels, restaurants, a post office, banks and shops has not developed around it. To the east there is an open development with numerous villa-style buildings, while to the west there are factories and dense housing estates in the Leipziger Vorstadt.

== Construction ==
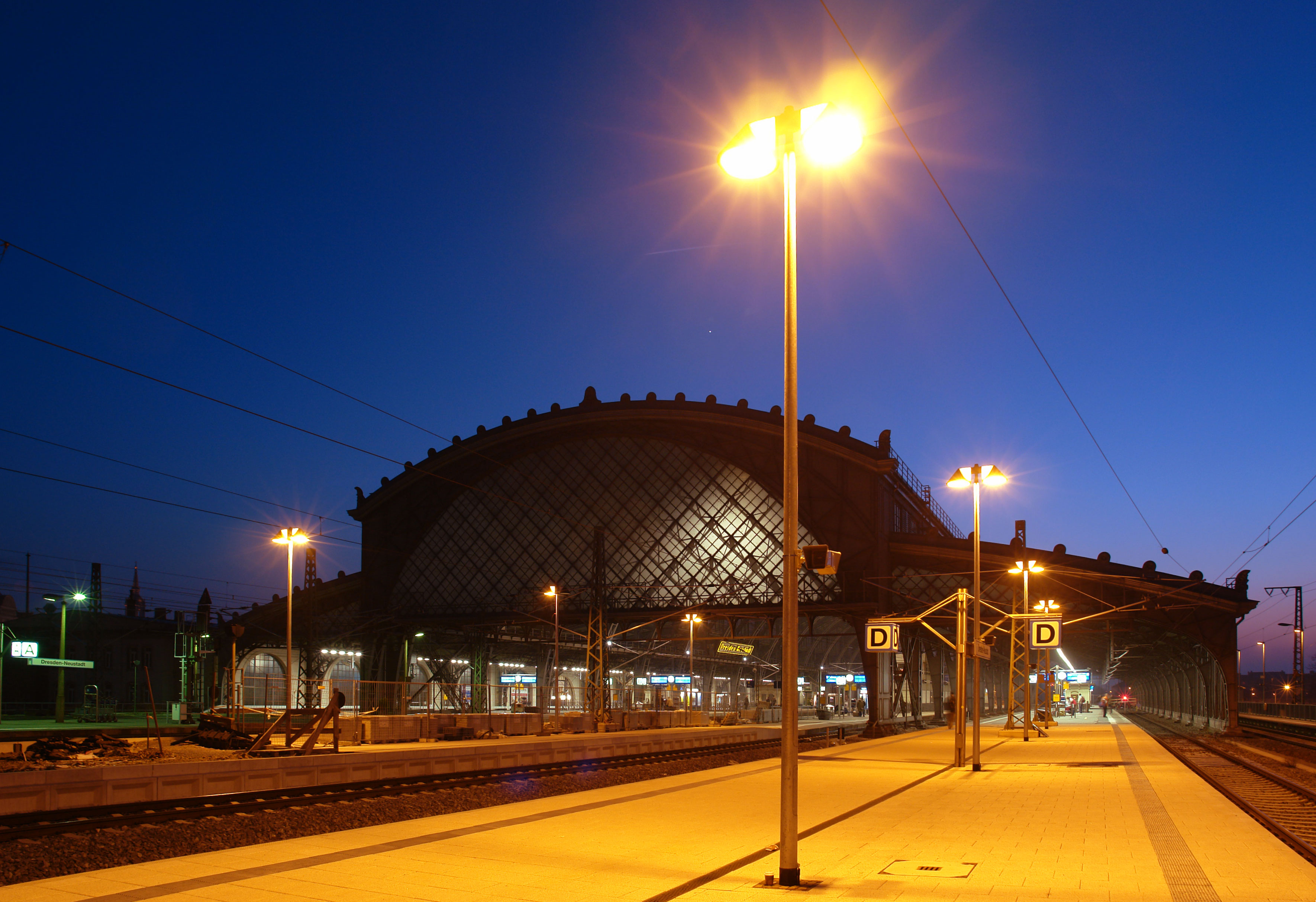
Northern view in the evening

The two-part station consists of the train shed, which is at an elevation of 6.35 metres, and the entrance building, which is at street level and faces Schlesische Platz. Inside two pedestrian tunnels link the entrance building at its centre with the platforms and connect with Hansastraße at their far ends.

=== Train shed ===
The train shed is 146 metres long, 70.5 metres wide and 19.3 metres high. It houses four platforms, each with two platform tracks (numbered 1 to 8). The middle four tracks are spanned by a 35.24 metre-wide arched hall. On both sides of the arch hall there are sloping roofs, each covering one platform with two tracks. Two crossing tracks for freight run past to the northwest outside the train shed.

=== Entrance building ===
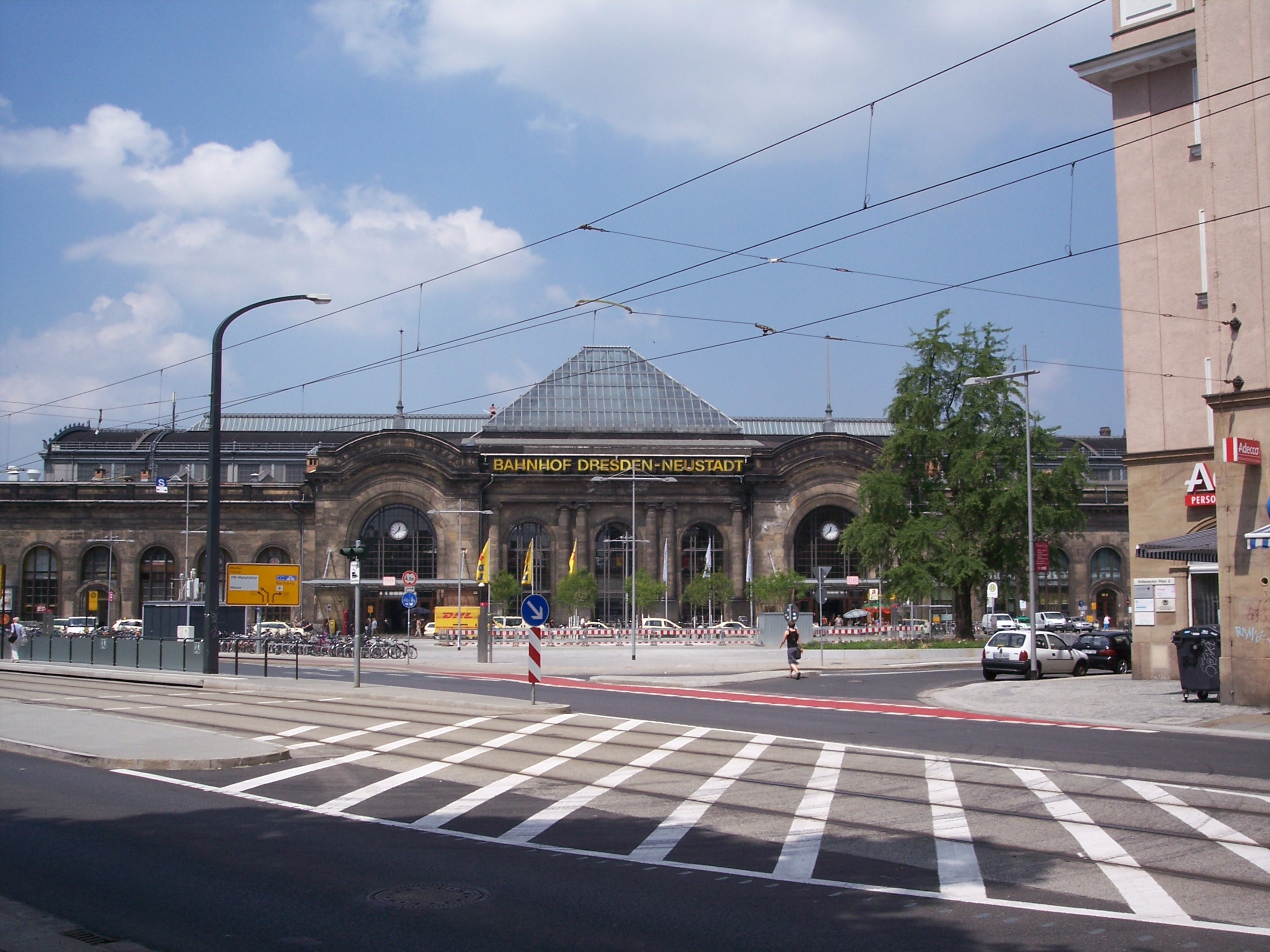
The station seen from Schlesischen Platz

The entrance building was largely built of sandstone under the direction of Otto Peters and Osmar Dürichen and is dominated by the lobby. Its large arched windows and columns are flanked by two imposing entrances. The two side wings, however, are rather simple. The facade of the entrance building on Schlesischen Platz, which has a total length of 177 metres, is a strictly symmetrical structure, with the exception of the balcony-like extension at the right end, which was originally the entrance to the royal apartments. 2,040 cubic metres of sandstone was needed for its construction.

The central foyer dominates the interior of the building. It is 52 metres wide, 30 metres long and 17 metres high. A three-part, slightly curved ceiling covers the lobby. Skylights and a glass pyramid-shaped canopy with a maximum height of 30 metres provide daylight in the lobby. The coats of arms of the Kingdom of Saxony and the city of Dresden and paintings adorn the brightly coloured walls and ceilings.

Originally, the ticket office was between the two portals and the baggage handling facilities were opposite them. Today food stalls offering snacks are located on the street side and a travel centre lies opposite them and a pharmacy is next to it. In addition, businesses supplying travel needs of all kinds operate in the hall.

The south-west wings originally housed waiting rooms for first and second class and one for women, as well as a dining room. Today it contains a discount food store and a fast food restaurant. Premises for rail operations have always been located in the north-eastern wing. It also contained the royal apartments, consisting of a reception room, a room for the royal entourage, a writing room, a dressing room and several adjoining rooms. These spaces are now used for restaurants.

A plaque is attached to the outer wall of the station building on Hansastraße commemorating Karl Theodor Kunz, the builder of the Leipzig–Dresden railway, the first long-distance railway in Germany. It was donated by the Sächsischen Ingenieurverein (Saxon Engineering Association) in 1869.

As part of an economic stimulus program announced in November 2008, the entrance building was rehabilitated by DB Station&Service AG to promote energy efficiency. In addition, a new waiting area was built.

=== Tracks ===
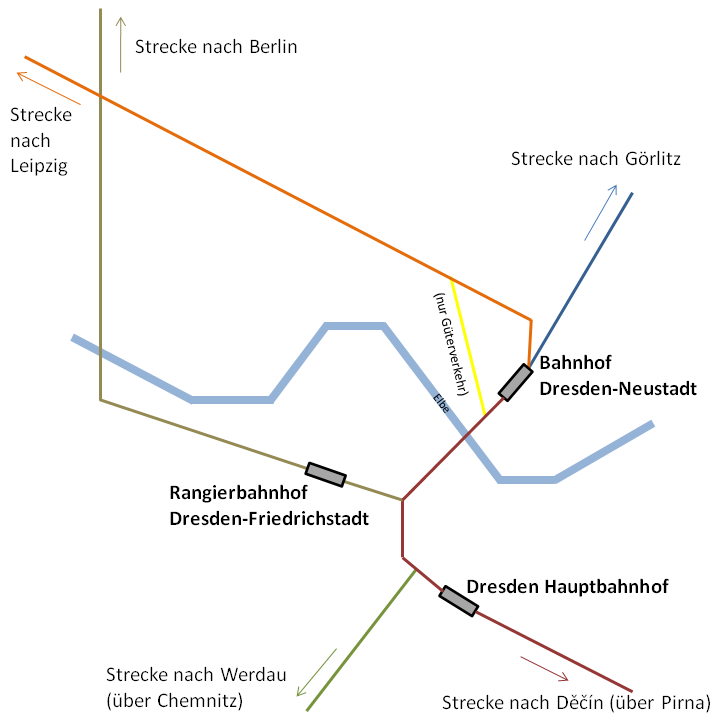
Schematic representation of the railways in Dresden showing the nationally significant passenger stations and freight yards

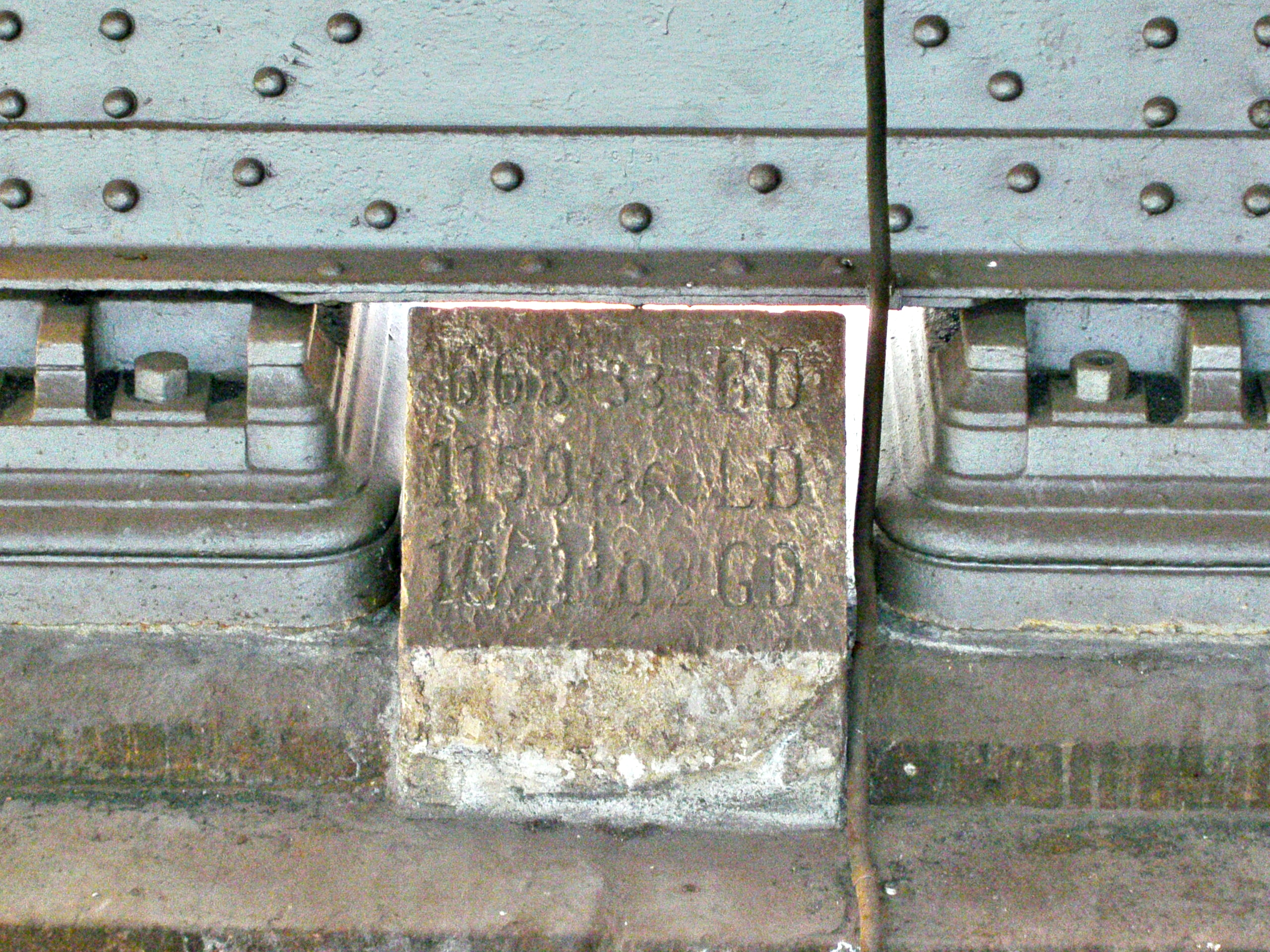
The triple kilometre stone behind platform 8 marks the three lines ending in the station

The through station, which is oriented in the southwest–northeast direction, is the terminus of three routes. The Děčín–Dresden-Neustadt railway approaches the station from the other side of the Elbe (chainage: 66.333 km) over the Marienbrücke. The Görlitz–Dresden (102.102 km) and Leipzig–Dresden (115.936 km) railways approach from the northeast. The direct line of the tracks forms the connection from the Marienbrücke towards Görlitz. The line from Leipzig connects through a curve from the northwest around 650 metres to the northeast of the station in Bischofsplatz. This connection is the only grade-separated junction in the station area.

Two elevated tracks run in the open to the northwest of the train shed, handling freight traffic to and from Görlitz. Freight trains to Leipzig turn north immediately after the Marienbrücke and run through the Dresden-Neustadt freight yard on the Dresden-Pieschen–Dresden-Neustadt railway. A separate double-track line existed until 2001 for freight trains running on the Görlitz–Leipzig route. In 2002, this was converted to a single-track connecting curve that branched from the northeastern part of the station toward Neustadt freight yard; this existed until 2005. The resulting triangle of tracks was almost opposite the entrance building. Between the connecting curve and the northern approach to the station are disused facilities of the former Dresden-Neustadt locomotive depot (Lokbahnhof).

Tracks were originally grouped by direction of operation. Tracks 1 to 4 were used by passenger trains leaving Dresden and tracks 5 to 8 were used by trains running into Dresden. The central platforms were reserved for long-distance services. Trains to and from Leipzig and Berlin ran on platform tracks 3 and 6 and trains to and from Görlitz ran on platform tracks 4 and 5. The suburban trains to Arnsdorf ran on platform track 1 and platform track 8 was used in the reverse direction. Platform tracks 2 and 7 were used by suburban traffic to and from Coswig and Meissen. Thus trains to and from the Görlitz line ran on platform tracks 1, 4, 5 and 8 and trains to and from the Leipzig line ran on the other platform tracks. On the northern approach next to track 1 there were storage facilities for suburban trains commencing or ending at the station.

There have been significant changes to the tracks since 2006 during renovations that continue. One aim of this work is to provide separate infrastructure for different routes.

Because some platforms were not available during the reconstruction, additional temporary platforms were built. Outside the train shed the inner of the two freight train tracks was used for platform 9, while the other track remained platform-free. From 2007 to September 2014, a further temporary outside platform called Dresden-Neustadt Außenbahnsteig (Gleis 10)—Dresden-Neustadt outside platform (track 10)—was located just a few metres away on the Dresden-Pieschen–Dresden-Neustadt line. Regional express trains on the Leipzig–Dresden route and S-Bahn trains temporarily stopped at platform 10, but only those running towards Dresden Hbf.

== History ==
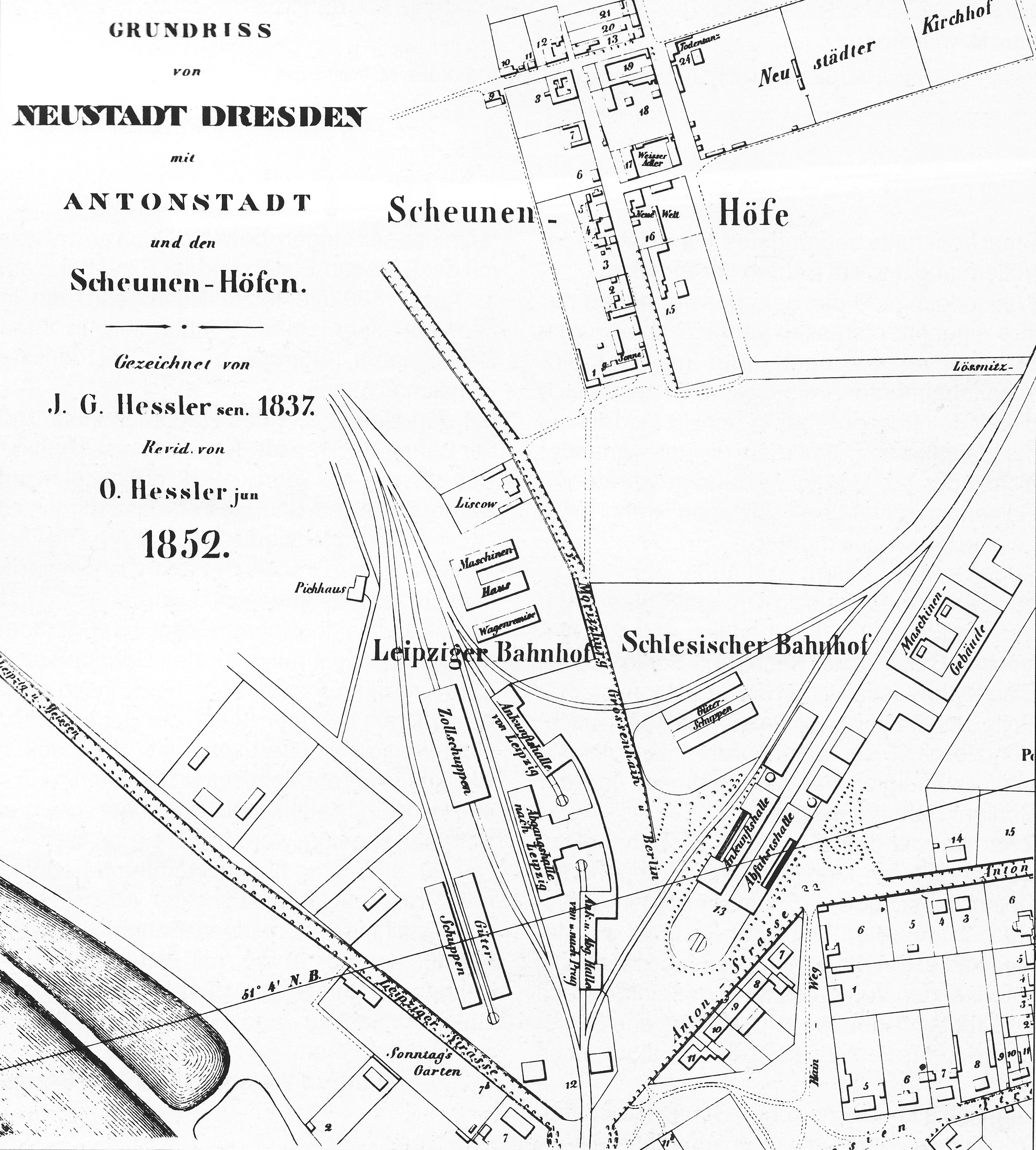
Location of the Leipziger Bahnhof and the Schlesischen Bahnhof

Dresden-Neustadt station replaced two earlier station located on the Neustadt side of the Elbe, the Leipziger Bahnhof (Leipzig station), and the Schlesischen Bahnhof (Silesian station). The latter is considered ita direct predecessor because Neustadt station was built at the same location.

=== Leipziger Bahnhof ===
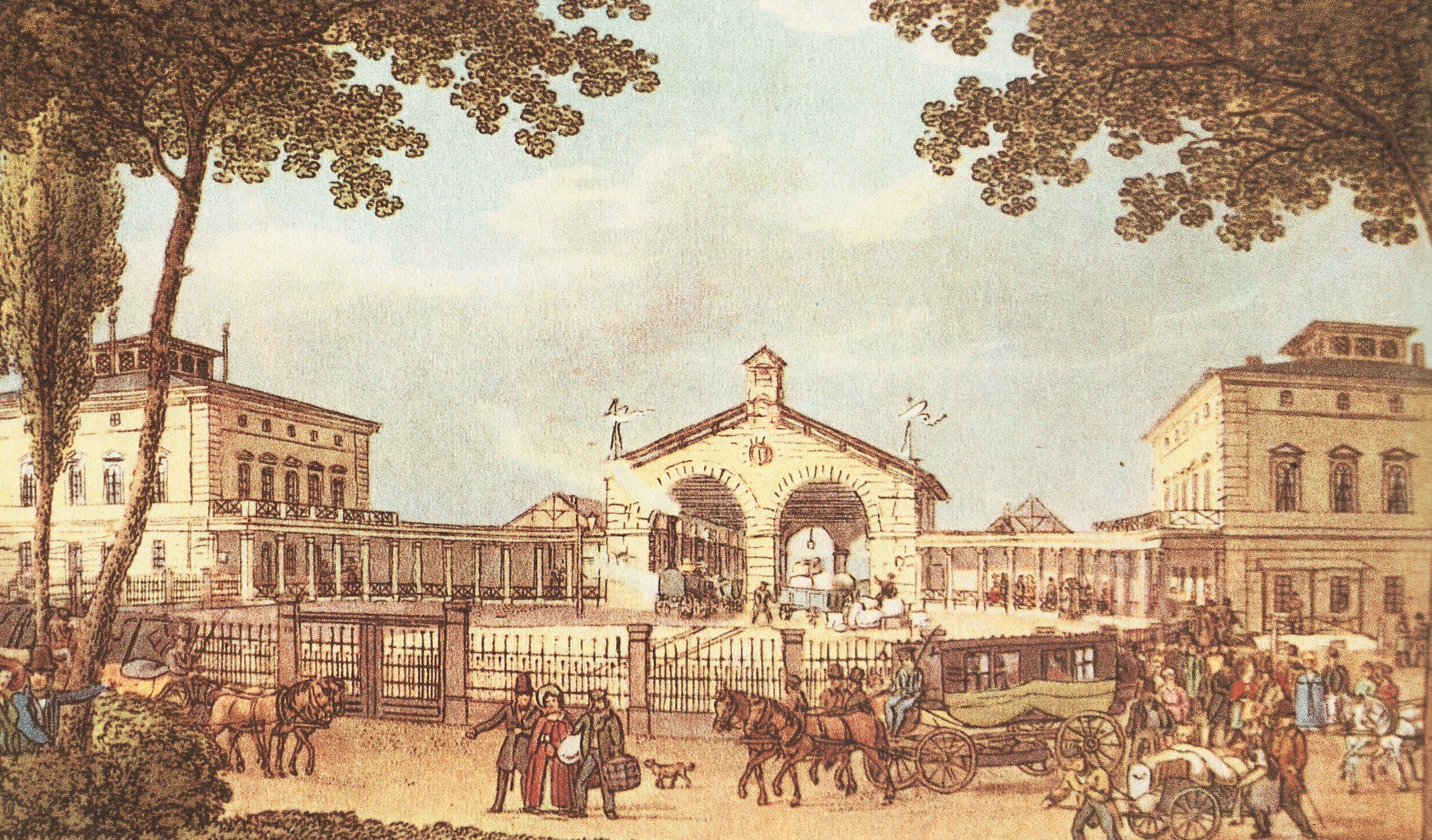
Leipziger Bahnhof in 1839

Inaugurated in 1839 as the terminus of the Leipzig–Dresden railway, the Leipziger Bahnhof was the first station in Dresden. The rapid growth of traffic and connections to the newly built railway lines made major expansions and renovations and the construction of new buildings necessary in the first decades after its opening. In 1901, the newly built Dresden-Neustadt station took over passenger traffic from the Leipziger Bahnhof. Most of its tracks continued to be used for the Dresden-Neustadt freight yard and some are still used.

=== Schlesischen Bahnhof ===
The Schlesischen Bahnhof was built between 1844 and 1847 under the direction and to the design of the Dresden architect Julius Köhler and was opened with its ground-level tracks along with the whole Dresden-Neustadt–Görlitz line on 1 September 1847. Designed as a combined road and railway bridge, the first Marienbrücke (the current road bridge) was already under construction, so the plans envisaged a through station, allowing a connection through the city to the planned station of the Saxon-Bohemian Railway Company. For the present, the southern end of the station only had one turntable to turn the locomotives. There were two laterally-arranged train sheds, with the departure hall facing Antonstraße and the arrivals hall on the opposite side.

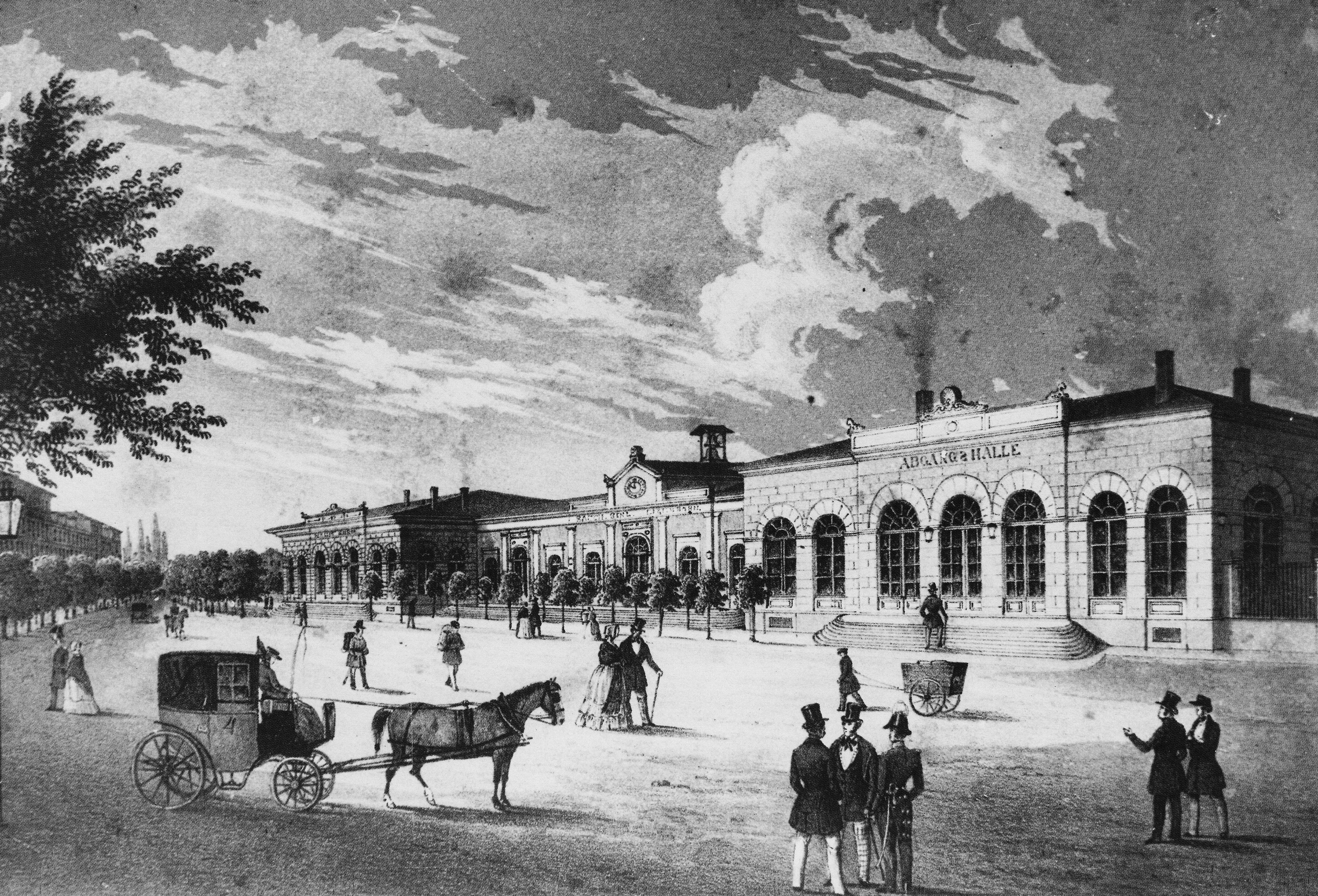
The entrance building of the Schlesischen Bahnhof in a lithograph of about 1850

The double-sided and symmetrically arranged station building consisted of two protruding wings and a recessed central section. The neo-classical single-storey building included two 96 metres-long train sheds with arched arcades, one covering the arrival platforms and the other the departure platforms. Two other tracks ran between the train sheds that were designed for the movement of rolling stock. The two station buildings differed only with regard to a few functionally-related trifles. The departure platforms could only be accessed through an entrance hall, which contained a ticket office, baggage acceptance facilities and restaurants. In contrast, the arrival platforms were freely accessible and bigger to cope better with the surge of traffic when trains arrived.

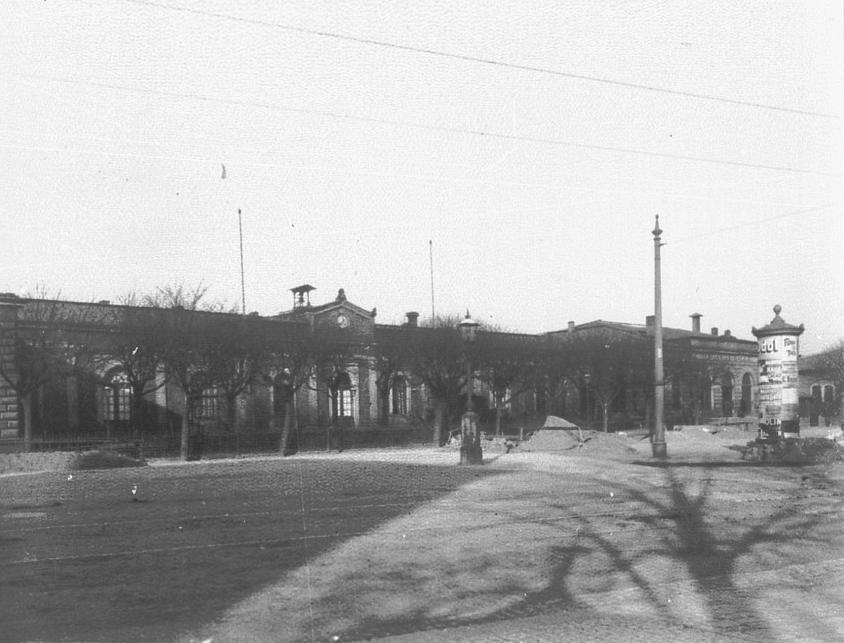
Around 1897: tram tracks already ran past the front of the Silesian Station

From the outset, a connecting track joined the freight yard of the Silesian station with the approach tracks of the Leipzig station. There it connected with a turntable. Operationally, however, this connection was unsatisfactory because only individual carriages could be transferred. A few years after the opening of the station, this connection was replaced by a connecting curve that did not involve a turntable and was located a few metres to the north.

The Marienbrücke, finished in 1852, enabled the connection of the railway tracks in the old town (Altstädt). The tracks running from the Silesian and Leipzig stations joined in front of the bridgehead. Apart from measures to modernise their operations, the grounds of the Silesian station then remained unchanged until the construction of the Dresden-Neustadt station.

=== Planning ===
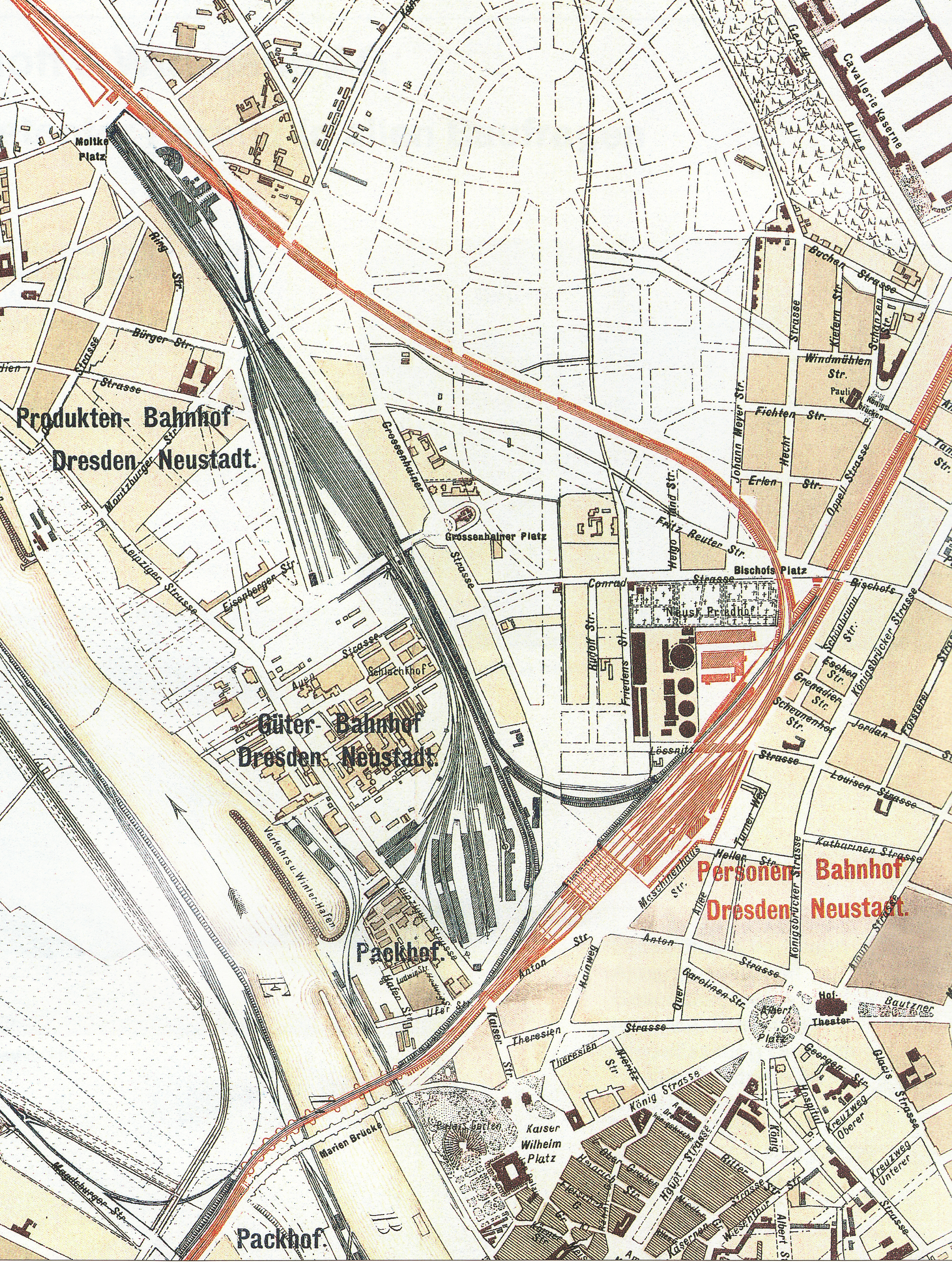
A design plan from 1895

The original railway installations in Dresden were based on no overall concept. Rather, each private railway company had its own station as the terminus of its main line, so by 1875 there were four different and poorly linked long-distance stations in Dresden. In addition, the many level crossings were creating significant traffic problems by the late 1880s when all the railway companies serving Dresden had been nationalised. It was decided to implement a profound transformation of the Dresden railway node under the auspices of Otto Klette, the commissioner of works (Baurat).

This transformation included the merger of the Leipziger and Silesian stations. The Silesian Station was chosen as the site for the new Neustadt station. This required a change in route of the last few kilometres of the Leipzig-Dresden railway so that it was realigned on the modern route from Dresden-Pieschen.

=== Construction and opening ===
Construction began in the spring of 1898. A temporary station had already been opened on the forecourt on 1 May 1898 to handle the traffic towards Görlitz during the construction period. Although intended only for a limited period, it was equipped with a pedestrian and baggage tunnel.

The Dresden-Neustadt passenger station was opened at 5:00 AM on 1 March 1901. An express freight train from Görlitz was the first train to pass through the new complex and was the first to use the new Marienbrücke, which was built for railway traffic only. Passenger train 642 from Bautzen began passenger services at 5:29 AM.

In addition to the traffic from Leipzig and Görlitz, the station handled the long-distance traffic from Berlin, which used the last few kilometres of the Leipzig–Dresden railway, and allowed these trains to connect directly with Dresden Hauptbahnhof, which had been opened three years earlier. The construction costs amounted to 4.1 million marks.

Under the timetable at the opening of the station, 162 trains a day departed from Dresden-Neustadt, as follows:

- 77 trains towards Dresden-Hauptbahnhof,
- 33 trains on the Arnsdorf–Bautzen–Görlitz route,
- 28 trains on the Meissen–Döbeln–Leipzig route,
- 14 trains towards Riesa–Leipzig route
- 10 trains towards Berlin.

=== Until the end of World War II ===
Only one luxury train ever operated through Dresden-Neustadt. From 1916 to 1918 a section of coaches of the Balkans Express from Berlin to Istanbul ran via Dresden with a stop at Dresden-Neustadt.

On 22 September 1918, a serious train crash occurred during the entry of Dresden-Neustadt station with the loss of 18 lives.

After the abdication of the king of Saxony in 1918, the rooms originally used for royal apartments were used as a railway museum from 1923 to 1945. Exhibits from this collection are now in the Dresden Transport Museum.

From 1936 to 1939, the Henschel-Wegmann Train operated from Dresden Hauptbahnhof to the Anhalter Bahnhof in Berlin, covering the route in about 100 minutes. In between the train stopped only in Dresden-Neustadt, which underlines the importance of the station for long-distance passengers. Also diesel multiple units of the Leipzig design briefly operated on the Dresden–Hamburg route via Dresden-Neustadt from 15 May 1939.

During the Second World War, in addition to the civil traffic, extensive military traffic had to be handled. An average of 28 military trains, carrying about 19,600 members of the Wehrmacht passed the station each day in October 1944. A care centre was set up by the National Socialist People's Welfare. At the end of the war, the baggage tunnel was used as shelter for 1,425 civilians and 735 decorated Wehrmacht troops. It was divided by temporary splinter bulkheads and equipped with sanitary areas in wooden crates. The last heavy bombing of Dresden on 17 April 1945, which was mainly aimed at transport facilities that were still intact after the 13 February raid, caused severe damage to the station, particularly in the area around the north-eastern exit.

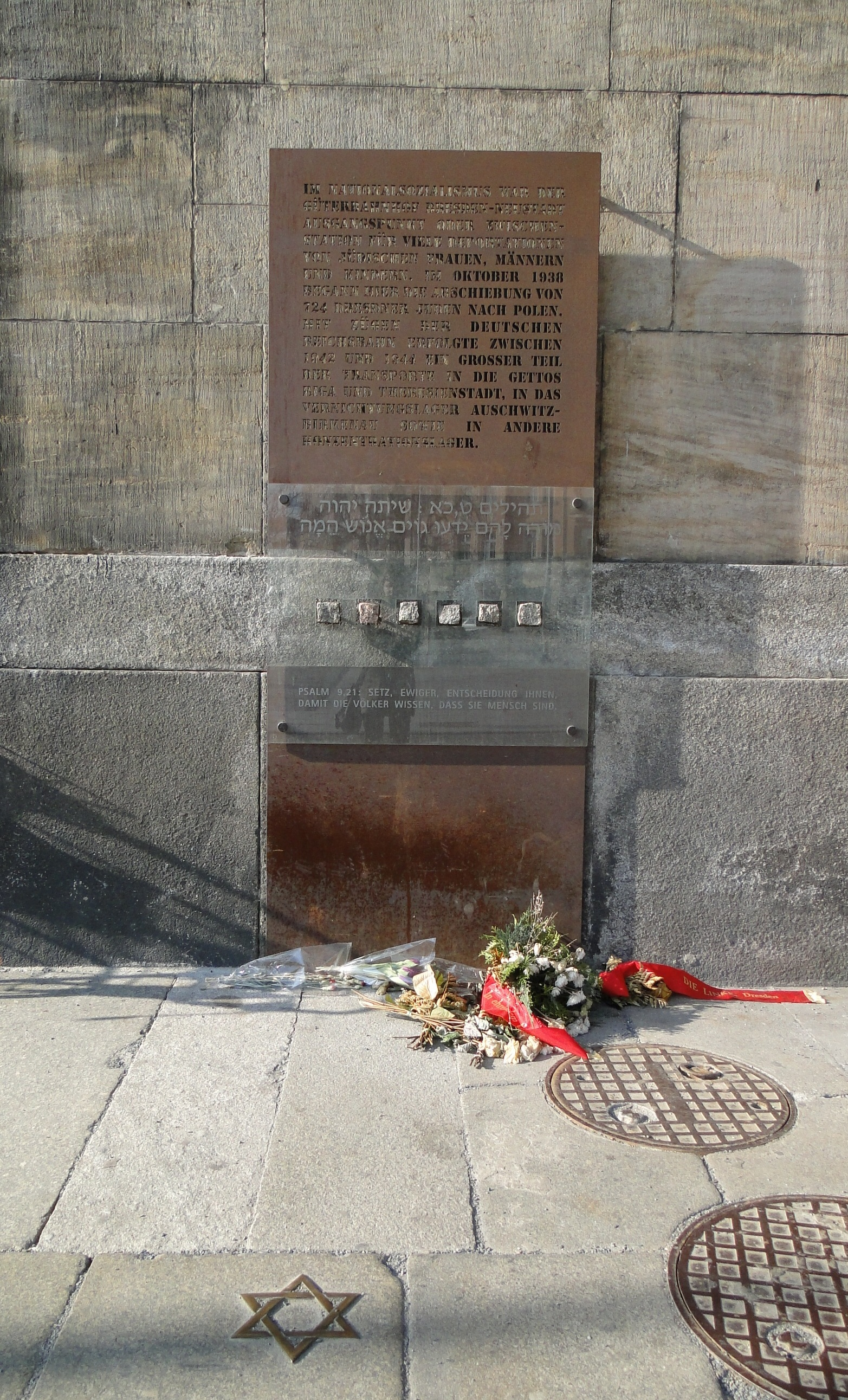
The plaque at the right entrance commemorates the deportation of Jews

During the Second World War, the adjacent Dresden-Neustadt freight yard was the starting point of two Holocaust trains. On 21 January 1942, a train left the station with unheated freight cars and 224 Jews from the administrative district of Dresden-Bautzen, reaching the Riga Ghetto four days later. A year later, on 3 March 1943, 293 Jews from Dresden were deported on another train to the Auschwitz concentration camp A memorial plaque on the right entrance of Dresden-Neustadt station is a reminder of this function of Neustadt freight yard

=== Reconstruction and operations during the GDR ===
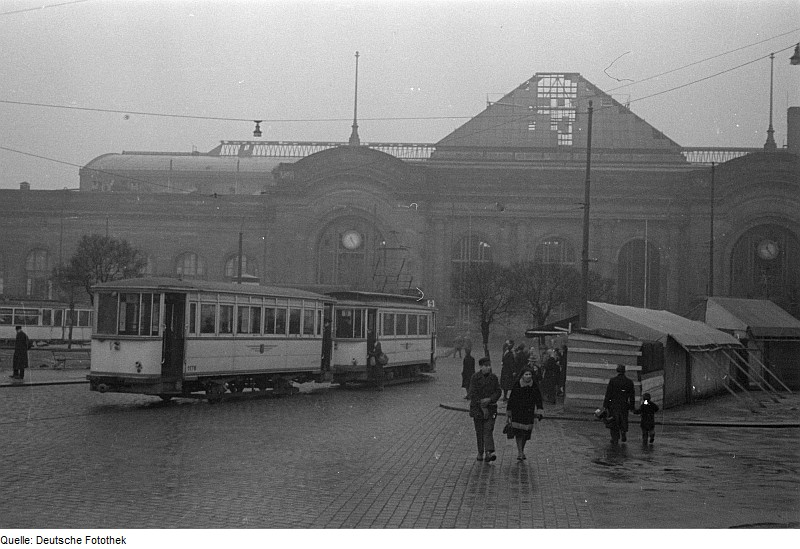
The station seen from Schlesischen Platz in 1947

Reconstruction began soon after the war. The need to provide war reparations to the Soviet Union proved to be much more difficult than the ravages of war. So the formerly four-track line between Dresden-Neustadt and Coswig was dismantled and reduced to a single track and one of the three tracks to Klotzsche was removed. This resulted in considerable restrictions on the order of operations and required that several trains at a time had to be cleared to run in each direction. Only the reopening of a second track between Dresden-Neustadt and Radebeul Ost in September 1964 eased the situation on that line. All four tracks over the Marienbrücke towards the Hauptbahnhof were returned to operation in October 1956. On the northeastern approaches to the station important track connections, overpasses and underpasses are still missing, so that the station has not yet achieved its original capacity. German Unity Transport Project (Verkehrsprojekte Deutsche Einheit) No. 9 is a continuing project designed to eliminate these bottlenecks among other things and to accelerate traffic. Following the upgrade of the approach tracks, local and regional traffic will be separated again.

Due to the proximity to military installations in Albertstadt, the Neustadt station was used for the movement of the Soviet military after the Second World War. Military officers were seated at specially equipped ticket offices with Cyrillic inscriptions and there was a special Soviet shop, also called Russenmagazin in German (магазин in Russian).

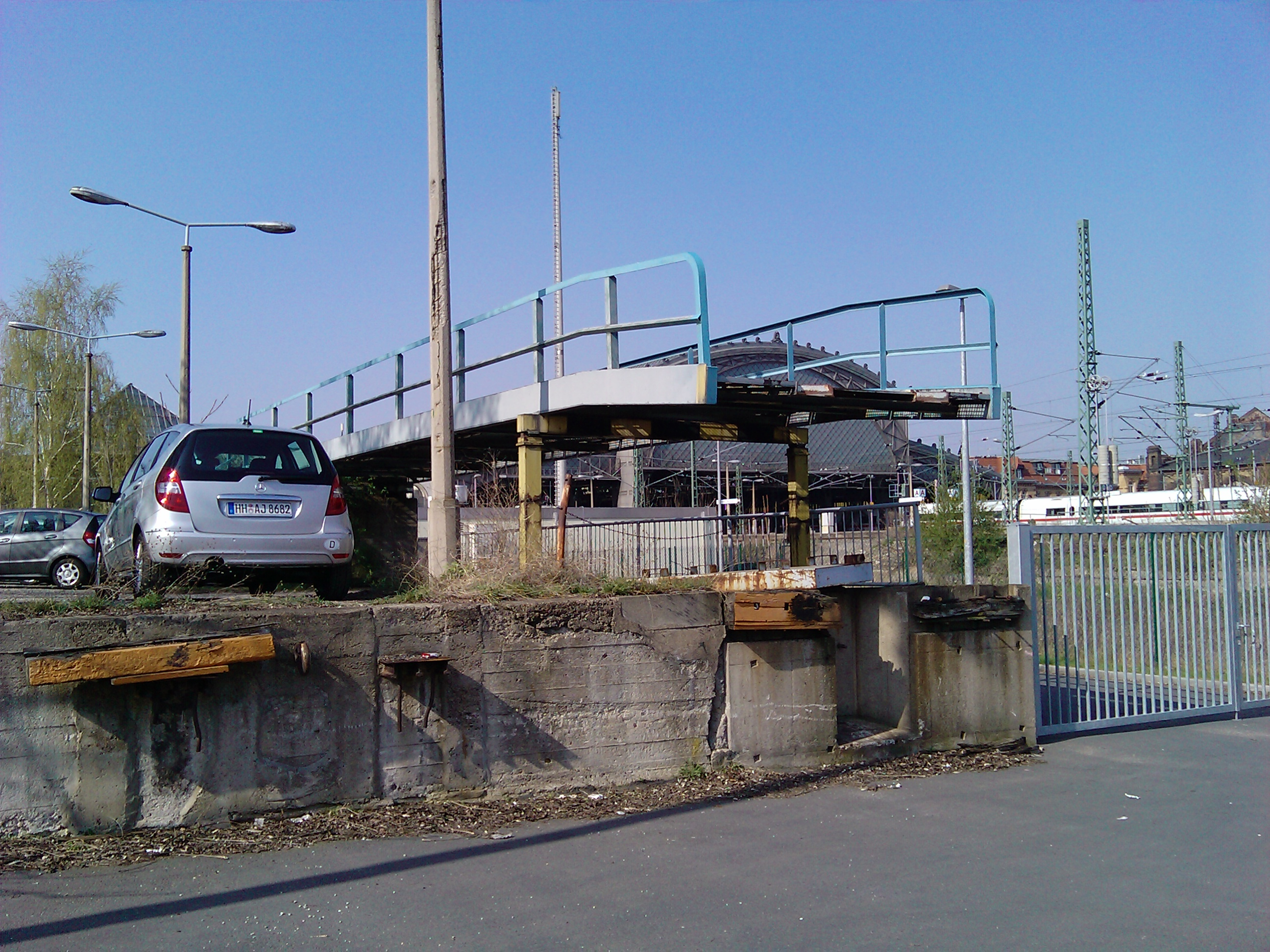
The former loading ramp at Dresden-Neustadt railway station (2010)

Electrification began on 28 September 1969. Electric push-pull operation commenced between Meissen-Triebischtal and Dresden Hauptbahnhof via Dresden-Neustadt in 1971. The Dresden S-Bahn opened in January 1973. Also in 1973, motorail operations commenced from Dresden-Neustadt station, the only place where it operated in the DDR. From May 1972, the Touristen-Express car-carrying train ran to Varna and, as of May 1973, the Saxonia-Express ran to Budapest. After Die Wende, the motorail operations from Dresden-Neustadt were abandoned in 1991. Today a car rental service uses the area next to the former loading ramp which lies to the east of the station building next to the parking facilities.

On 24 September 1977, the last steam express service, D 1076, hauled by 01 2204, left from Dresden-Neustadt station towards Berlin. In contrast, in local passenger and freight transport, class 52 steam locomotives were still seen in 1987.

The station retained its importance even for long-distance traffic. With few exceptions, long-distance trains stopped in both Dresden Hauptbahnhof and Dresden-Neustadt. To avoid the time-consuming reversal of trains at the Hauptbahnhof, some trains operated from Neustadt station. This was true, for example, for the Städteexpress Fichtelberg from Karl-Marx-Stadt to Berlin-Lichtenberg.

The station building was extensively renovated in 1971. The two station tunnels and the exits to the platforms were given wall coverings with tiles and mosaic. The former Mitropa-Keller bar was given new interiors in a style that was then contemporary and reopened as the Saxonia-Keller station restaurant.

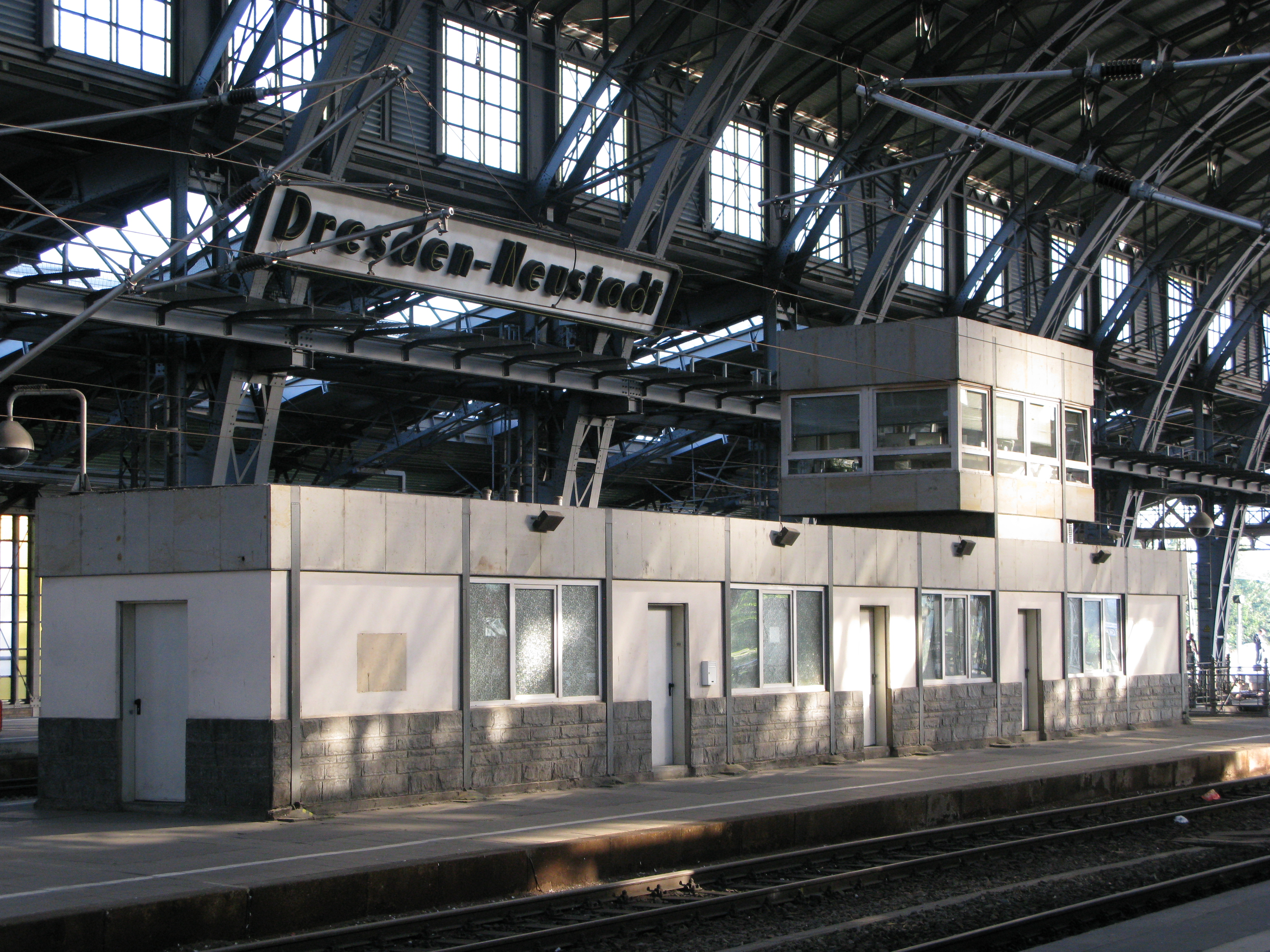
The supervisory building built in 1980

The platform facilities experienced minor changes in the 1980s. A supervisory building was built between tracks 5 and 6 and taken into operation on 1 June 1980. It is designed from a purely functional point of view and does not correspond to the architecture of the train shed or the old operations building. For the state visit of Kim Il Sung in July 1984, a platform extension that had been planned for 19 years was realised. The platform between tracks 7 and 8 was extended by the length of two carriage toward the north, so that the delegation did not have cross the gravel. The lobby was renovated for the 150th anniversary of the opening of the first German long-distance railway between Leipzig and Dresden in 1989.

Shortly before the fall of the Berlin Wall, 450 trains a day served the station and 50,000 travellers used it daily. Only seven Deutsche Reichsbahn stations handled more trains and only 10 handled more passengers.

=== Refurbishment and operation following German reunification ===
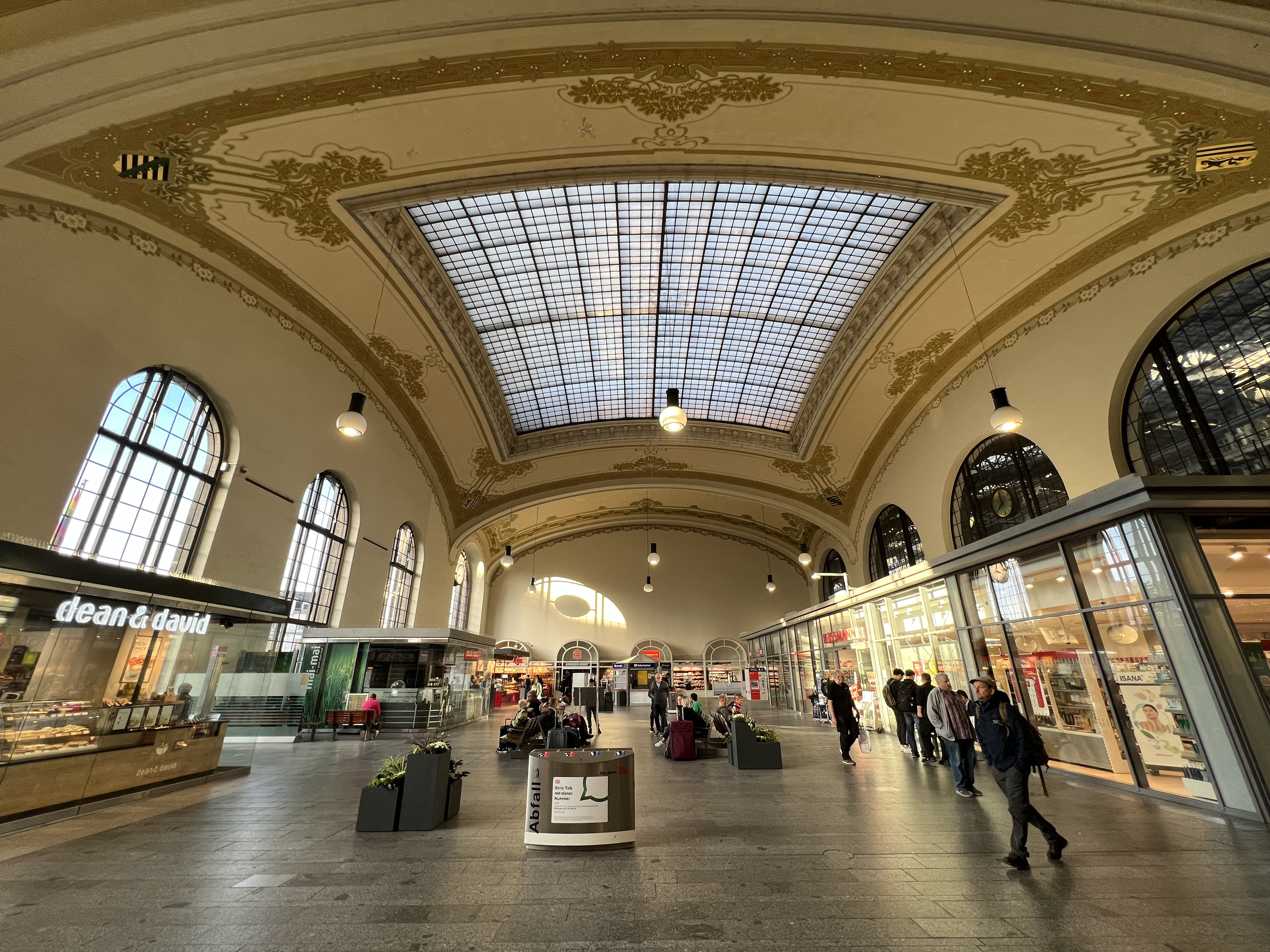
Lobby of the station

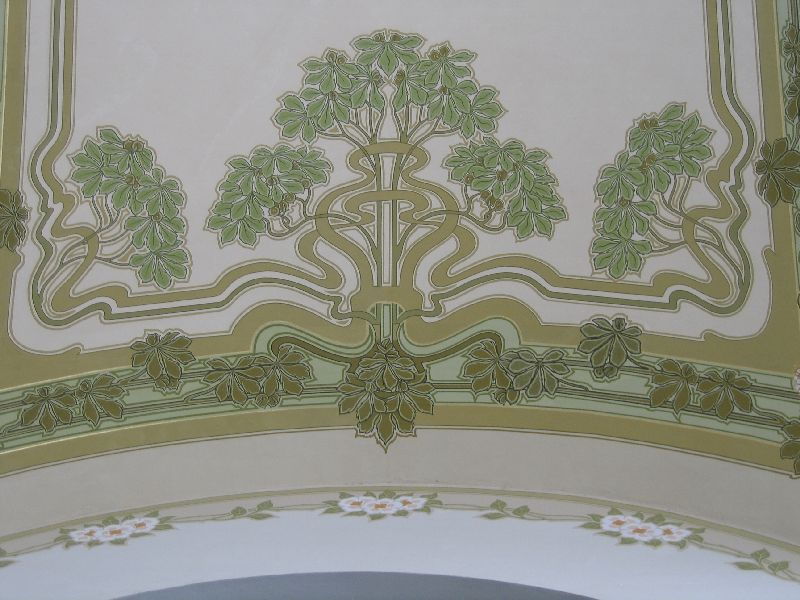
Detail of Art Nouveau ceiling painting in the lobby

The lobby and train sheds were extensively renovated for the station's 100th anniversary in 2001. The latter received new glazing and a lime green wooden roof. The decorative elements in the gable area were restored.

The lobby received a modern translucent roof and an Art Nouveau (Jugendstil) painting in ochre and green tones, which had been rediscovered in 1997 under layers of plaster, was reconstructed. In addition, the second-largest image ever made in Meissen porcelain (after the Fürstenzug) is now displayed on an inner wall of the entrance building. The Meissen porcelain factory created the 90 square-metre mural of 900 tiles designed by the painters Horst Brettschneider and Heinz Werner. It shows Saxony's most beautiful castles and gardens in 22 impressions.

InterCity trains stopped for the first time in Dresden-Neustadt in the summer of 1991, as the new federal states had been included in the intercity network. From 1994, Intercity-Express trains ran to Dresden for the first time, stopping until September 1998 in Dresden-Neustadt station, where four platforms were increased temporarily to a height of 55 centimetres above the rail to accommodate them. InterRegio trains ran from 1991 to 2004 via Dresden-Neustadt. They connected Dresden with Wrocław and Warsaw, which could not be reached without changing trains after the abandonment of these services. Since 2009, three pairs of Regional-Expresses have again provided direct services to Wrocław via Görlitz. An InterConnex ran to Berlin (some continuing to Stralsund) from 2002 to 2006. Due to the extensive construction at the station, the EuroCity train on the Berlin-Dresden-Prague route did not stop at Dresden-Neustadt from the timetable change on 13 December 2009 until the end of 2013. EuroCity trains running towards Dresden Hauptbahnhof are still diverted via Cossebaude (as of the 2015 timetable).

== Development ==
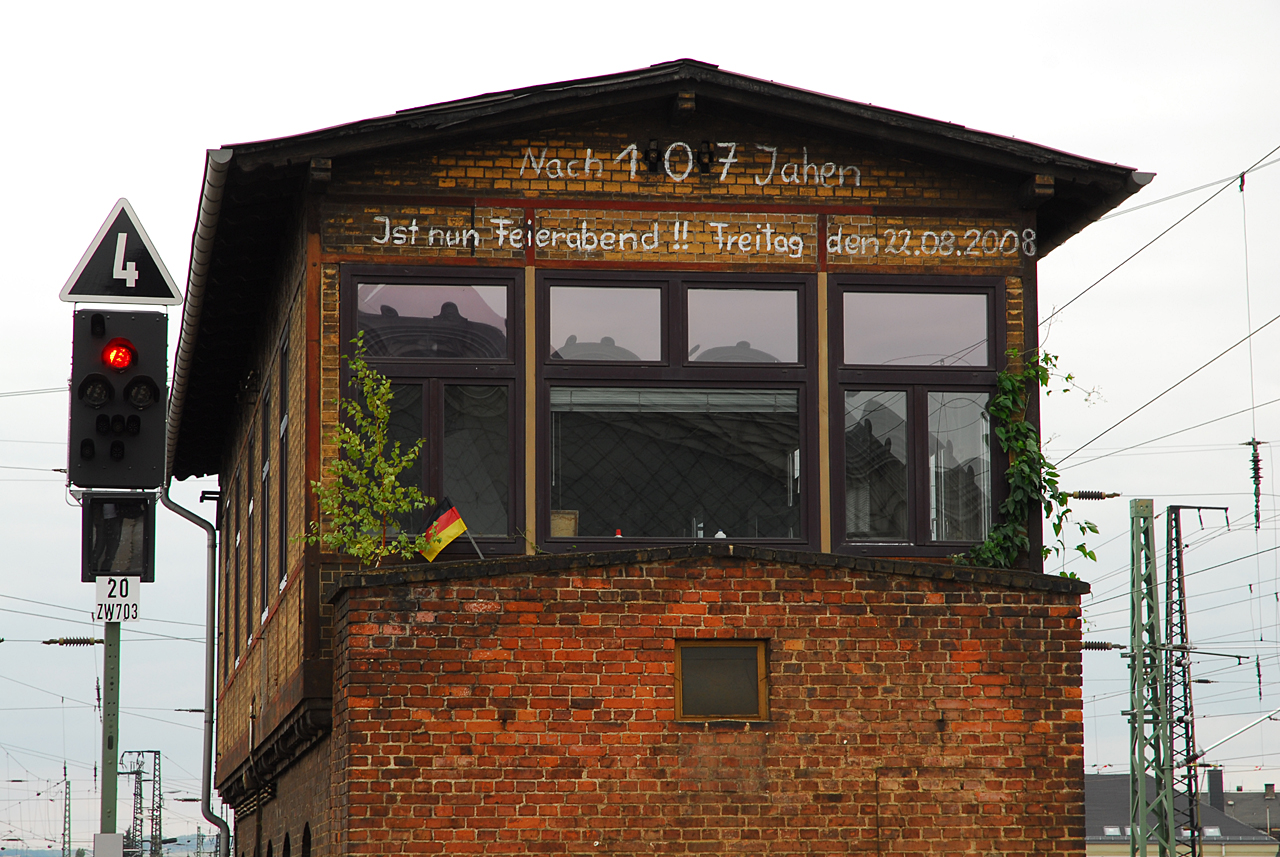
Inscription on a signal box, after the mechanical interlockings were replaced by an electronic interlocking after 107 years of operation, reading: After 107 years: It's now quitting time!! Friday, 22 August 2008

In mid-2006, extensive renovation work began to remodel the station approaches including a change in the track layout and renewal of several bridges and two flying junctions. Among other things, four tracks are being restored on the Dresden–Leipzig railway to Radebeul in order to provide two long-distance and regional tracks and two S-Bahn tracks. The upgrade of the approaches from the Elbe was completed in October 2010.

The reconstruction of the central and eastern part of the station was carried out between the spring of 2010 and the autumn of 2014. The platform tracks and platforms were renewed and the platforms over the platform tunnel were rebuilt to provide disability access. Platforms 1 and 2 were rehabilitated for the S-Bahn.

In August 2008, a new electronic interlocking controlled by the Leipzig Operating Centre (Betriebszentrale) replaced seven locally operated signal boxes, some using lever frames. It controls the train traffic between Weinböhla and Dresden-Neustadt. It replaced five mechanical interlockings of the Jüdel type and two power signal boxes (Befehlsstellwerk) of S&H type. An automatic track vacancy detection system was not installed. Two dispatchers direct operations using the Sächsischen Befehlsblocks (Saxon command block) system. An upgrade and adaptation of these systems in the course of the German Unity Transport Project (Verkehrsprojekts Deutsche Einheit) No. 9 has not been possible as the regulations could not have been complied with. Many jobs were lost in relation to signalling, control of points and train detection. Of the seven signal boxes, only signal box 1 on the eastern side has been retained as a memorial.

A flyover taking the Görlitz–Dresden line over the Leipzig–Dresden line went into operation in 2007. During construction, two temporary platforms were erected outside the train shed as several platforms and tracks were not available. The rolling stock storage area next to track 1 will be dismantled during the remodeling of the tracks, .

The operation on ten mainline tracks and two local tracks was converted from tracks arranged by direction of operation to being arranged by line. The southern platform (platforms 1 and 2) would be reserved for the future S-Bahn railway traffic while platform 3/4 would be reserved for regional traffic. The two northern platforms (platforms 5/6 and 7/8) are shared by long-distance and regional traffic. Nearby to the north there are two tracks for through trains, which were originally part of a connecting curve from the Leipzig-Dresden railway, connecting from the west in the southern approaches. Five bridges (some built in the style of the original construction of the station), 54 sets of points, two flying junctions and 101 metres of noise barrier (at Bischofsplatz) are being built. The running speed will be increased in the station area from 40 km/h or 60 km/h to 80 km/h throughout except at junctions on some route. Main line and S-Bahn services will be continuously separated. Two turnback tracks have been built for S-Bahn services.

The total cost of the remodeling of the track layout, the renewal of the civil engineering works and the replacement of mechanical interlocking by electronic Interlocking is €95 million A total of €33 million has been budgeted for the reconstruction of the central part of the station, of which €14.4 million is for S-Bahn-projects.

The construction of the 2.5 km long section was expected to take four years in mid-2006. The main works were completed at the end of 2014. Work is still under construction in the Bischofsplatz area.

== Transport ==
The station gives the entire northern part of the city as well as the Upper Lusatia and the lower part of the Dresden Basin s access to the Intercity-Express network. It enables the distribution of arrivals and departures within the city and the metropolitan area, thus relieving the main station. In the assessment of Deutsche Bahn, it is classified after Dresden Hauptbahnhof and Leipzig Hauptbahnhof, but along with Chemnitz Hauptbahnhof, as a category 2 station (see also List of railway stations in Saxony).

=== Long distance services ===
Dresden-Neustadt station gives long-distance trains access to the northern part of Dresden and to other towns like Radebeul, Radeberg, Kamenz and Coswig. In the 2026 timetable the following long-distance lines stop at the station:

Line	Route		Frequency (min)
IC 17	Rostock – Neustrelitz – Berlin – BER Airport – Dresden-Neustadt – Dresden Hbf – Chemnitz		Every 2 hours
RJ 27	Hamburg-Altona/Copenhagen/Kiel – Hamburg – Berlin Hbf – Berlin Südkreuz – Dresden-Neustadt – Dresden – Prague (– Brno – Břeclav –)	Bratislava – Budapest Keleti	Every 2 hours
RJ 27	Hamburg-Altona/Copenhagen/Kiel – Hamburg – Berlin Hbf – Berlin Südkreuz – Dresden-Neustadt – Dresden – Prague (– Brno – Břeclav –)	Vienna	Every 2 hours
ICE 50	Dresden – Dresden-Neustadt – Riesa – Leipzig – Erfurt – Gotha – Eisenach – Fulda – Frankfurt – Frankfurt Airport – Mainz – Wiesbaden		Every 2 hours
IC 55; ICE 55	Dresden – Dresden-Neustadt – Riesa – Leipzig – Halle – Köthen – Magdeburg – Braunschweig – Hannover – Minden – Herford – Bielefeld – Gütersloh – Hamm – Dortmund – Hagen – Wuppertal – Solingen – Cologne – Bonn – Mainz – Mannheim – Heidelberg – Stuttgart (– Tübingen)		Every 2 hours
ES	Brussels – Rotterdam – Amsterdam – Amersfoort – Bad Bentheim – Berlin – Dresden Neustadt – Dresden – Bad Schandau – Prague		1 train pair thrice a week

=== Regional services ===
In the 2026 timetable the following regional stop at the station:

Line	Route	Frequency (min)	Operator
RE 1	Dresden Hbf – Dresden Mitte – Dresden-Neustadt – Dresden-Klotzsche – Bischofswerda – Bautzen – Löbau (Sachs) – Görlitz (- Zgorzelec)	60	Trilex
RE 2	Dresden Hbf – Dresden Mitte – Dresden-Neustadt – Dresden-Klotzsche – Bischofswerda – Ebersbach – Zittau (– Liberec)	120	Trilex
RE 15	Dresden Hbf – Dresden Mitte – Dresden-Neustadt – Coswig – Ruhland – Hoyerswerda	120	DB Regio Nordost
RE 18	Dresden Hbf – Dresden Mitte – Dresden-Neustadt – Coswig – Ruhland – Senftenberg – Cottbus	60	DB Regio Nordost
RE 50	Dresden Hbf – Dresden Mitte – Dresden-Neustadt – Coswig – Riesa – Leipzig Hbf	60	DB Regio Südost
RB 33	Dresden-Neustadt – Dresden-Klotzsche – Königsbrück	60	DB Regio Südost
RB 60	Dresden Hbf – Dresden Mitte – Dresden-Neustadt – Dresden-Klotzsche – Bischofswerda – Bautzen – Löbau – Görlitz	60	Trilex
RB 61	Dresden Hbf – Dresden Mitte – Dresden-Neustadt – Dresden-Klotzsche – Bischofswerda – Ebersbach – Zittau	120	Trilex
S 1	Meißen – Coswig – Radebeul – Dresden-Neustadt – Dresden Mitte – Dresden Hbf – Heidenau – Pirna – Bad Schandau – Schöna	10/20 (Meißen-Triebischtal–Pirna Mon–Fri peak); 30 (60 to Schöna)	DB Regio Südost
S 2	Dresden Flughafen – Dresden-Klotzsche – Dresden-Neustadt – Dresden Mitte – Dresden Hbf – Heidenau – Pirna	30 (to Pirna Mon-Sat)	DB Regio Südost
S 8	Dresden Hbf – Dresden Mitte – Dresden-Neustadt – Dresden-Klotzsche – Kamenz	60 (30 during peak)	DB Regio Südost
As of 8 March 2026

=== Transport links ===
==== Public transport ====
From the outset, Dresden-Neustadt station was served by the tram network of the Dresdner Verkehrsbetriebe (Dresden Transport) or its predecessor organisations. Today there are three trams stop at the station, which connect to the nearby tram hub at Albertplatz. The first bus service was operated in Dresden from here to Nürnberger Straße from April 1914 and the bus routes connecting to the region outside northern Dresden now start and end here. In addition, the long-distance buses to Leipzig/Halle Airport and Berlin operate via the station.

==== Private transport ====
Stopping places for cars are provided in Schlesischen Platz and at the rear entrance in Hansastraße. There is also a limited number of pay parking spaces on both sides.

== See also ==
- Rail transport in Germany
- Railway stations in Germany
