= Dresden-Pieschen station =

Railway station in Dresden, Saxony

Dresden Pieschen
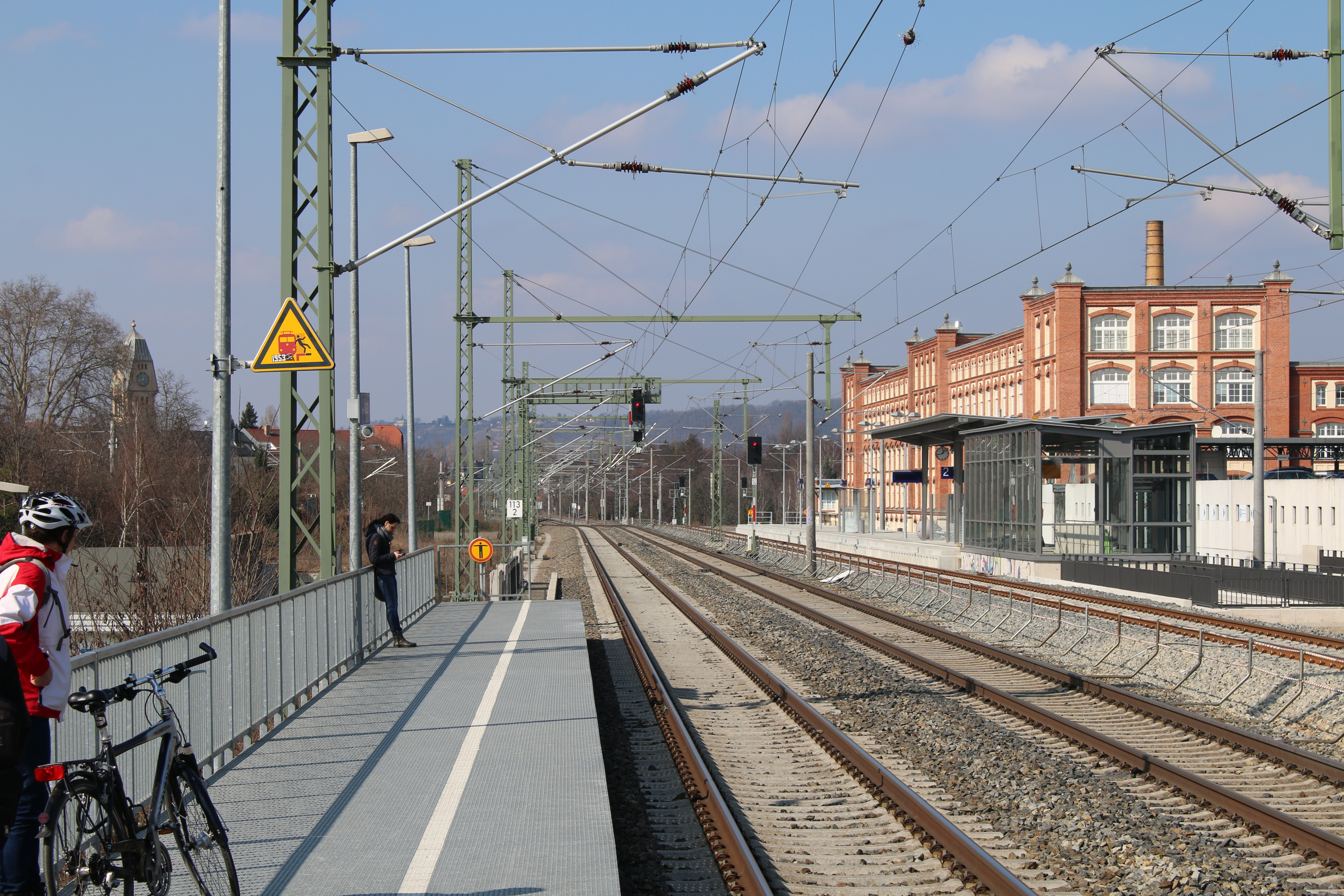

General information
- Location: Leisniger Platz 7a 01127 Dresden, Saxony; Germany
- Coordinates: 51.0820°N 13.7253°E
- Operator: DB Station&Service
- Line: Pirna–Coswig railway
- Platforms: 1
- Tracks: 2
- Train operators: S-Bahn Dresden

Other information
- Station code: 1354
- DS100 code: DBS
- IBNR: 8011423
- Category: 5
- Website: www.bahnhof.de

History
- Opened: 1 May 1902

Services
| Preceding station | Dresden S-Bahn | Following station |
|---|---|---|
| Dresden-Trachau towards Meißen Triebischtal | S 1 | Dresden Bischofsplatz towards Schöna |
Location

Dresden-Pieschen station (German: Bahnhof Dresden-Pieschen) is a railway station in the town of Dresden, Saxony, Germany. The station lies on the Pirna–Coswig railway.
