= Dresden Freiberger Straße station =

Railway station in Dresden, Germany

Dresden Freiberger Straße
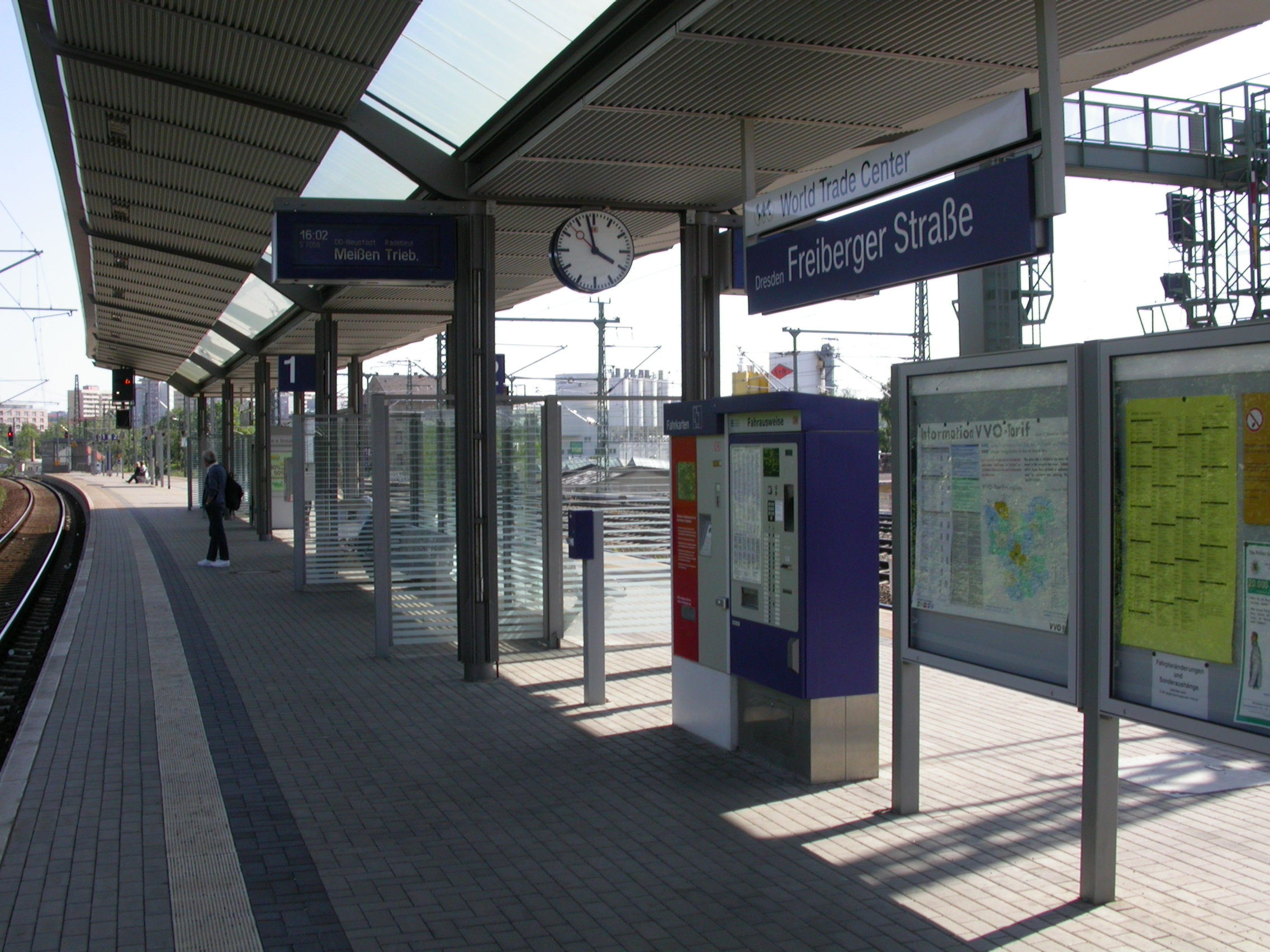

General information
- Location: Freiberger Straße 39; 01159 Dresden, Saxony; Germany
- Coordinates: 51.0479°N 13.7199°E
- Operator: DB Station&Service
- Line: Pirna–Coswig railway
- Platforms: 1
- Tracks: 2
- Train operators: S-Bahn Dresden

Other information
- Station code: 8091
- DS100 code: DHFR
- IBNR: 8011431
- Category: 5
- Website: www.bahnhof.de

History
- Opened: 12 December 2004

Services
Preceding station	Dresden S-Bahn	Following station
Dresden Mitte towards Meißen Triebischtal	S 1	Dresden Hbf towards Schöna
Dresden Mitte towards Dresden Flughafen	S 2	Dresden Hbf towards Pirna
Location

Dresden Freiberger Straße station (German: Haltepunkt Dresden Freiberger Straße) is a railway station in the town of Dresden, Saxony, Germany. The station lies on the Pirna–Coswig railway.

The station has a 140-meter covered platform with two tracks as well as barrier-free access in the form of an elevator. It is served by lines S1 and S2. The platform is accessible through a tunnel running along the road. In the pre-station area near the exit, there are two modernly equipped tram stops where lines 7, 10 and 12 stop, ensuring fast connections to the city core.
