= Dresden-Trachau station =

Railway station in Dresden, Germany

Dresden Trachau
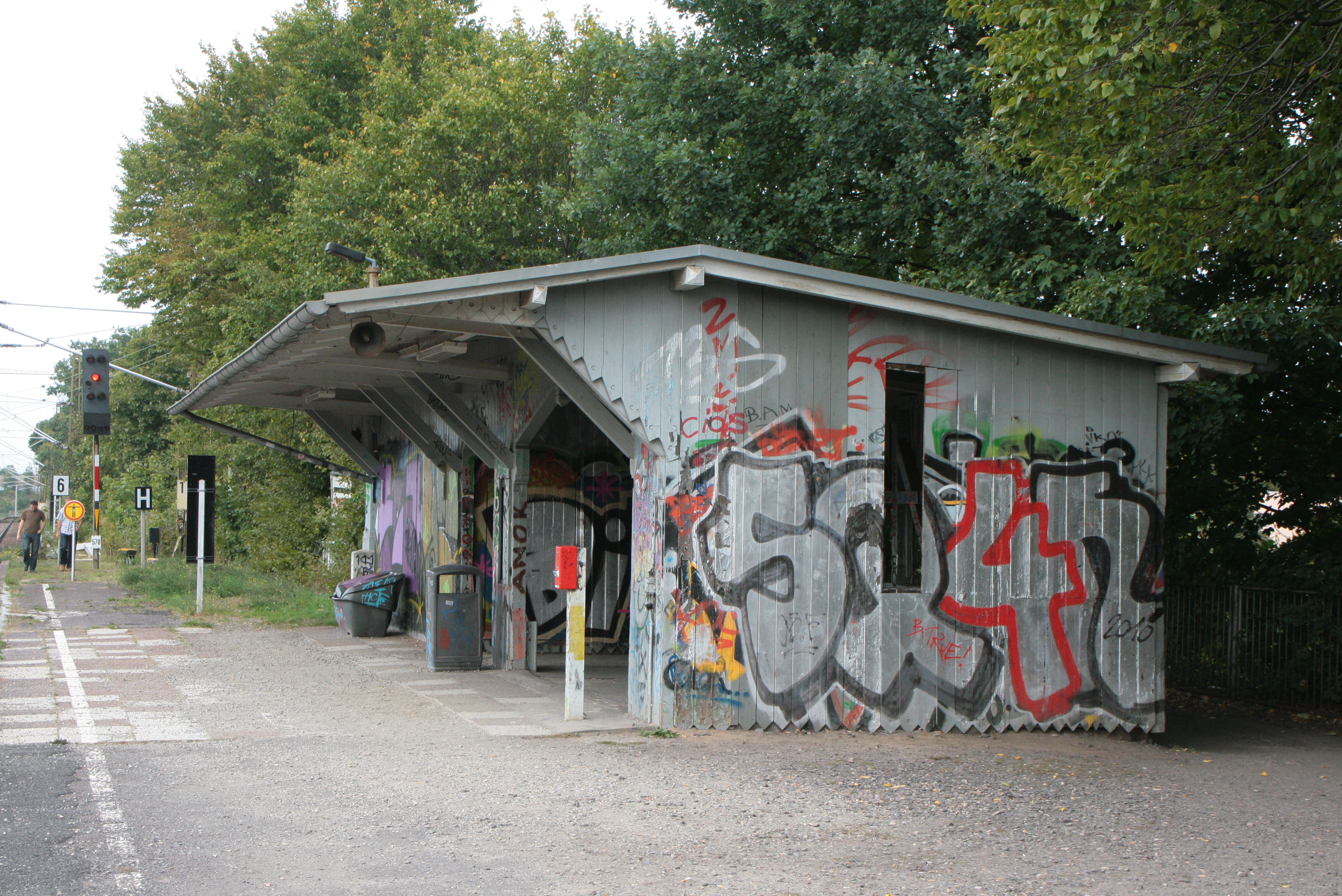
- The old passenger shelter before the station was rebuilt in 2015/2016.

General information
- Location: Am Trachauer Bahnhof 7; 01127 Dresden, Saxony; Germany
- Coordinates: 51.0899°N 13.7042°E
- Operator: DB Station&Service
- Line: Pirna–Coswig railway
- Platforms: 1
- Tracks: 2
- Train operators: S-Bahn Dresden

Other information
- Station code: 1359
- DS100 code: DTR
- IBNR: 8011427
- Category: 5
- Website: www.bahnhof.de

History
- Opened: 1 May 1902

Services
Preceding station	Dresden S-Bahn	Following station
Radebeul Ost towards Meißen Triebischtal	S 1	Dresden-Pieschen towards Schöna
Location

Dresden-Trachau station (German: Bahnhof Dresden-Trachau) is a railway station in the town of Dresden, Saxony, Germany. The station lies on the Pirna–Coswig railway.
