= Dresden Bischofsplatz station =

Railway station in Dresden, Germany

Dresden Bischofsplatz
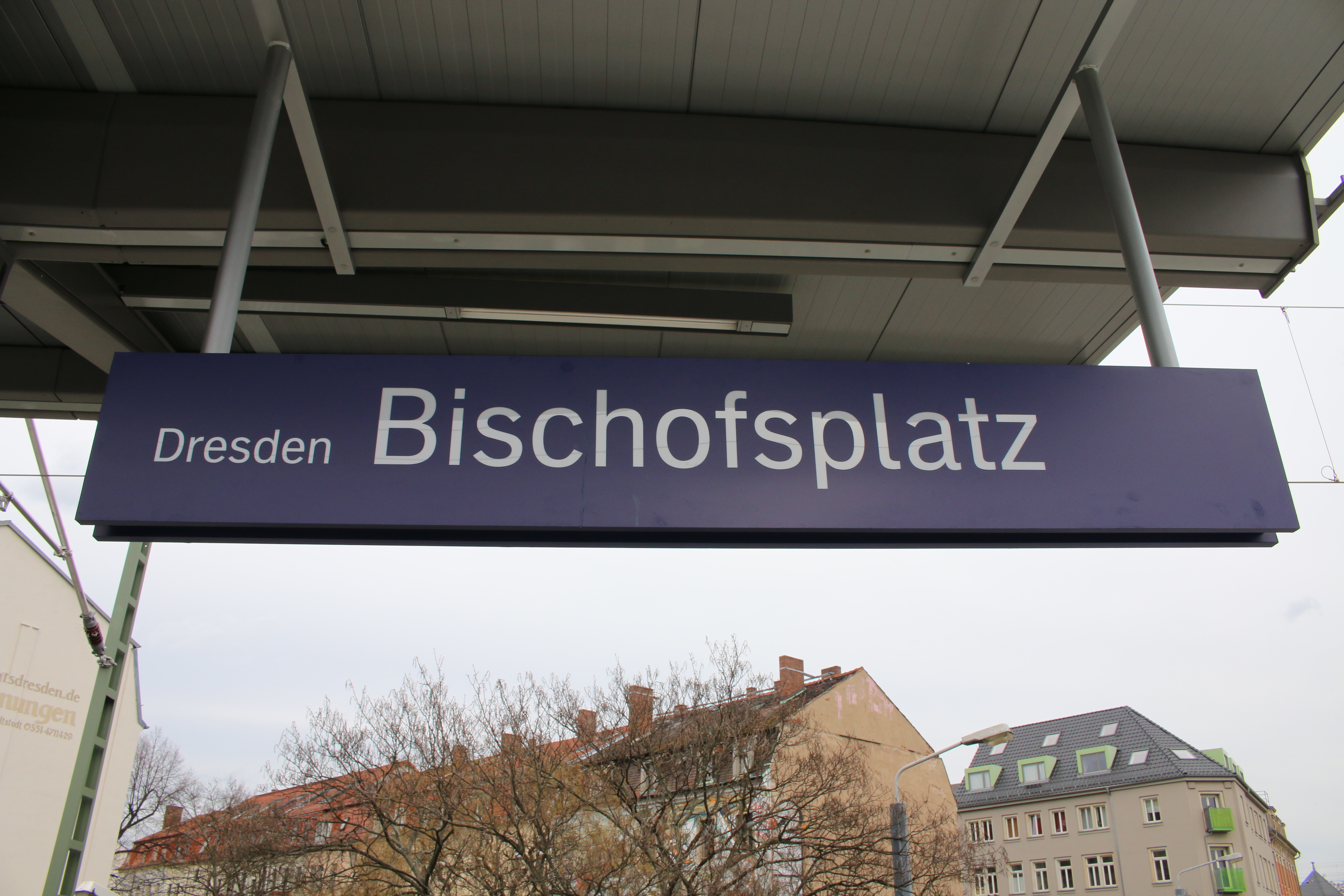

General information
- Location: Bischofsplatz 6; 01097 Dresden; Saxony; Germany
- Coordinates: 51.0723°N 13.7464°E
- Owner: DB Netz
- Operator: DB Station&Service
- Line: Pirna–Coswig railway
- Platforms: 1
- Tracks: 2
- Train operators: S-Bahn Dresden

Other information
- Station code: 8092
- DS100 code: DBPL
- IBNR: 8011416
- Category: 5
- Website: www.bahnhof.de/bahnhof-de/Dresden_Bischofsplatz.html

History
- Opened: 18 March 2016; 10 years ago

Services
Preceding station	Dresden S-Bahn	Following station
Dresden-Pieschen towards Meißen Triebischtal	S 1	Dresden-Neustadt towards Schöna
Location

Dresden Bischofsplatz station (German: Bahnhof Dresden Bischofsplatz) is a railway station in the town of Dresden, Saxony, Germany. The station is located on the Pirna–Coswig railway.

== Gallery ==
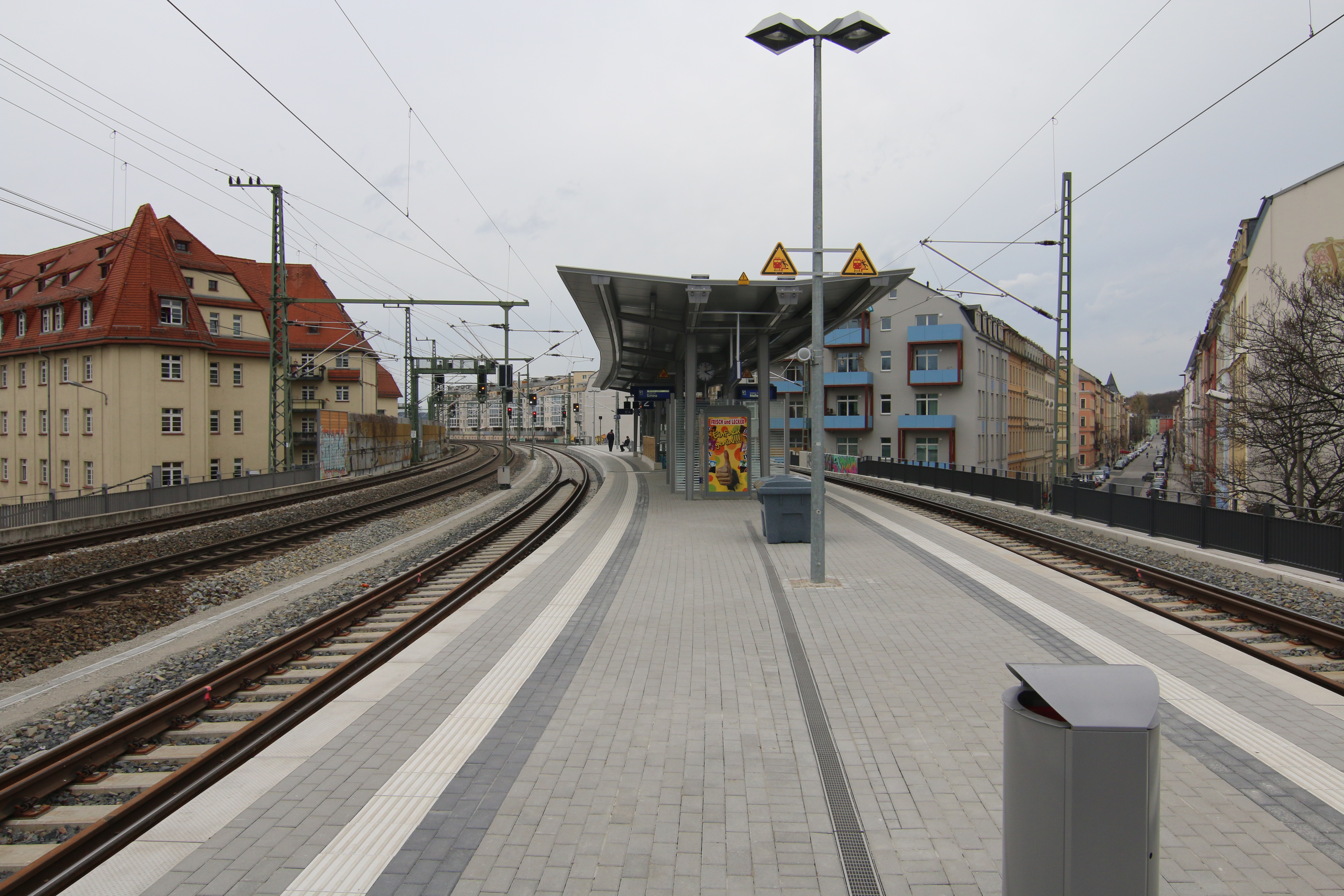

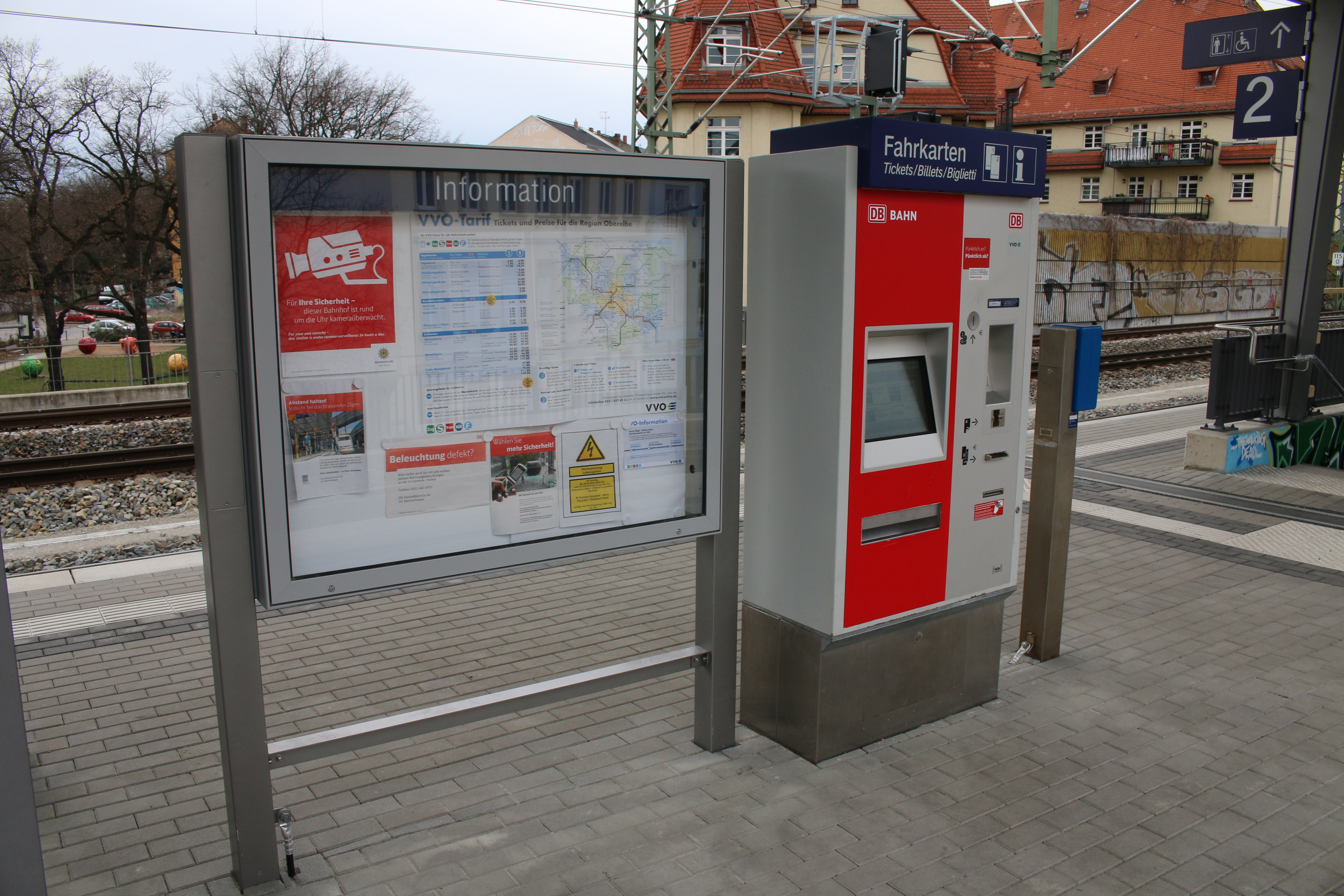

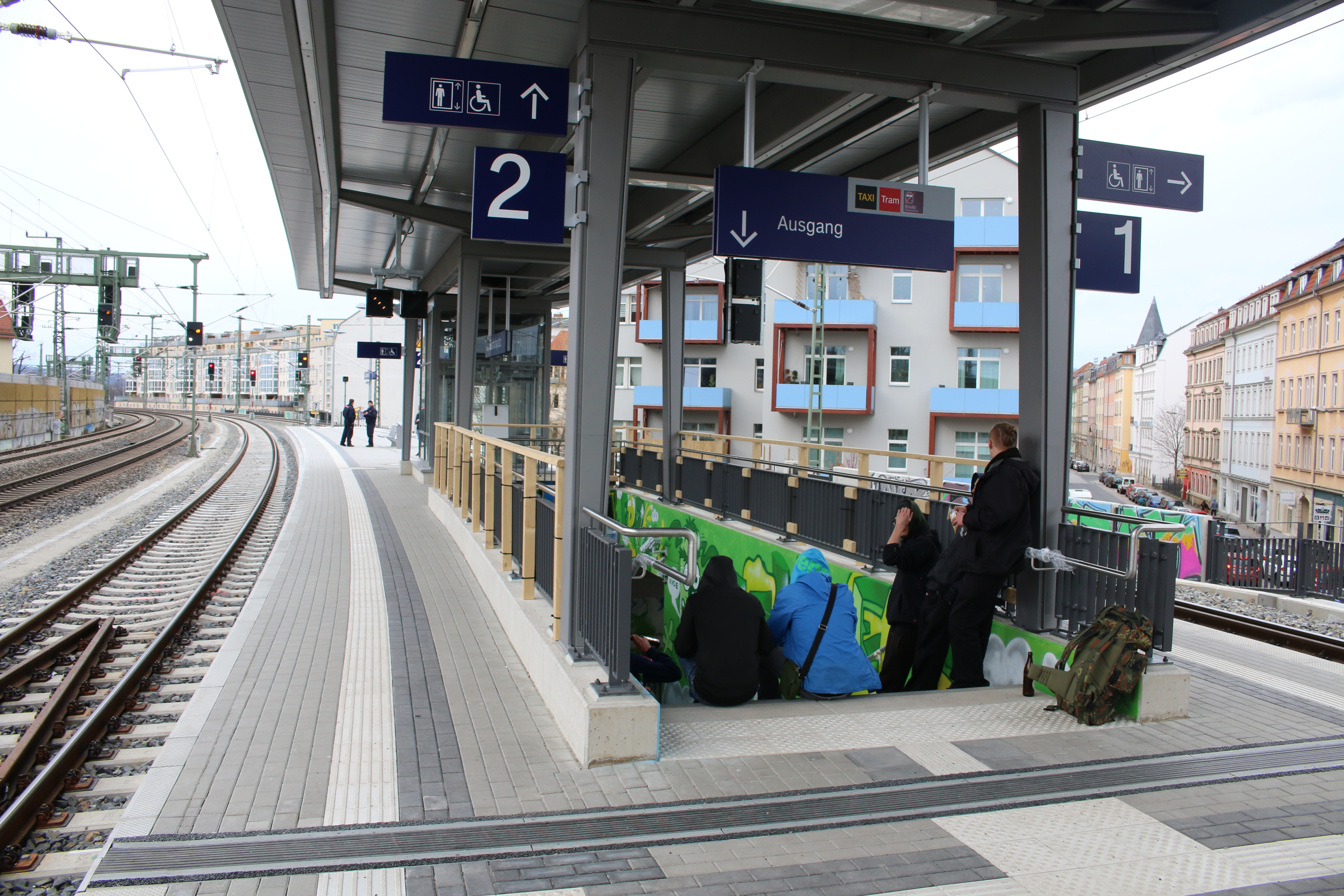

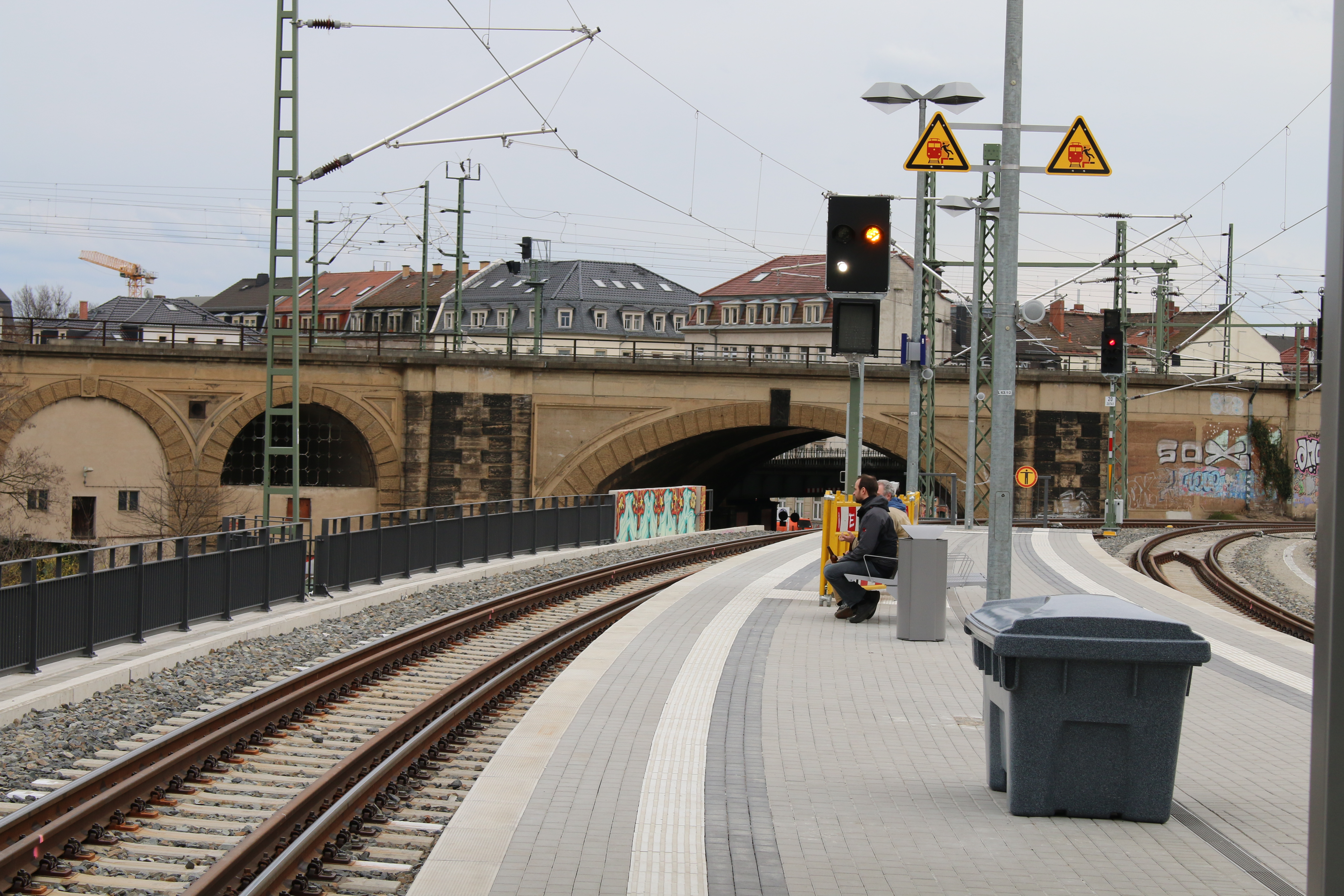
