= Kamenz (Sachs) station =

Railway station in Kamenz, Germany

Kamenz (Sachs)
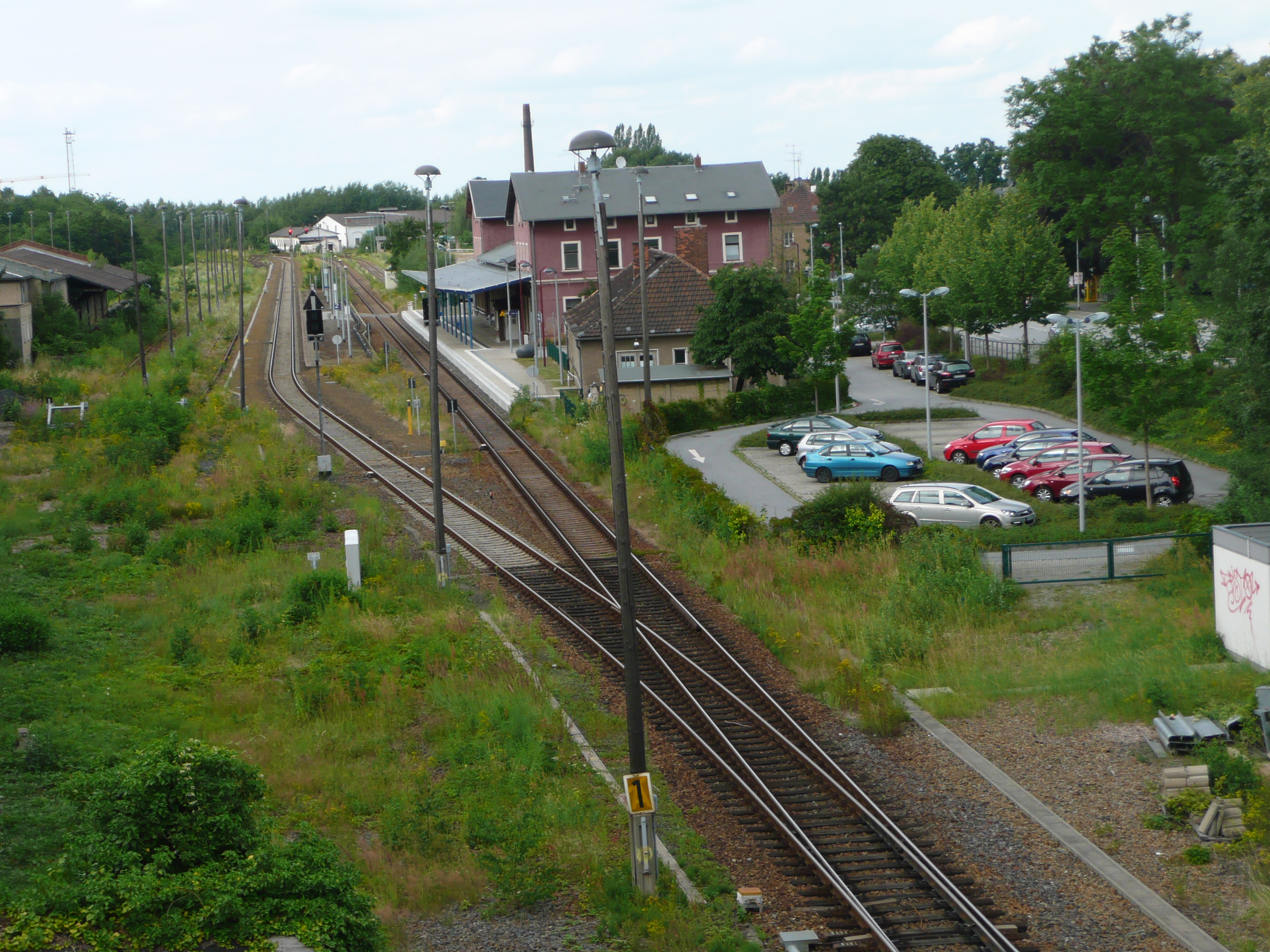
- The station in 2015 as seen from south

General information
- Location: Robert-Koch-Platz 1, 01917 Kamenz; Saxony, Germany
- Coordinates: 51.2738261°N 14.0924259°E
- Lines: Lübbenau–Kamenz; Kamenz–Pirna; Kamenz–Bischofswerda (defunct)
- Platforms: 1

Other information
- Station code: 3097
- DS100 code: DKA
- Category: 6
- Website: www.bahnhof.de

History
- Opened: 30 September 1871

Services
Preceding station	Dresden S-Bahn	Following station
Bischheim-Gersdorf towards Dresden Hbf	S 8	Terminus
Location
- Location within Saxony Location within Germany Location within Europe

Kamenz (Sachs) station (German: Bahnhof Kamenz (Sachs)) is a railway station in Kamenz, Germany. The station is located on the Lübbenau–Kamenz and Kamenz–Pirna lines. It is operated by DB Station&Service.

== Services ==
=== Railway services ===
Regular passenger services run only on southbound Kamenz–Pirna railway and are currently operated by DB Regio Südost as part of the Dresden S-Bahn. Trains run on an hourly schedule, with additional peak-hour services.

Occasionally there are tourist passenger services also along northbound Lübbenau–Kamenz railway, branded as Lausitzer Seenlandbahn, offering connections between Dresden and Lusatian Lake District.

A few freight services also operate, mainly along northbound Lübbenau–Kamenz railway.

=== Local transport ===
City bus lines 21, 22 and 23 as well as many regional bus lines frequently stop at this station. The bus station is located on the east side of the railway station.
