= Dresden-Klotzsche station =

Railway station in Dresden, Germany

Dresden Klotzsche
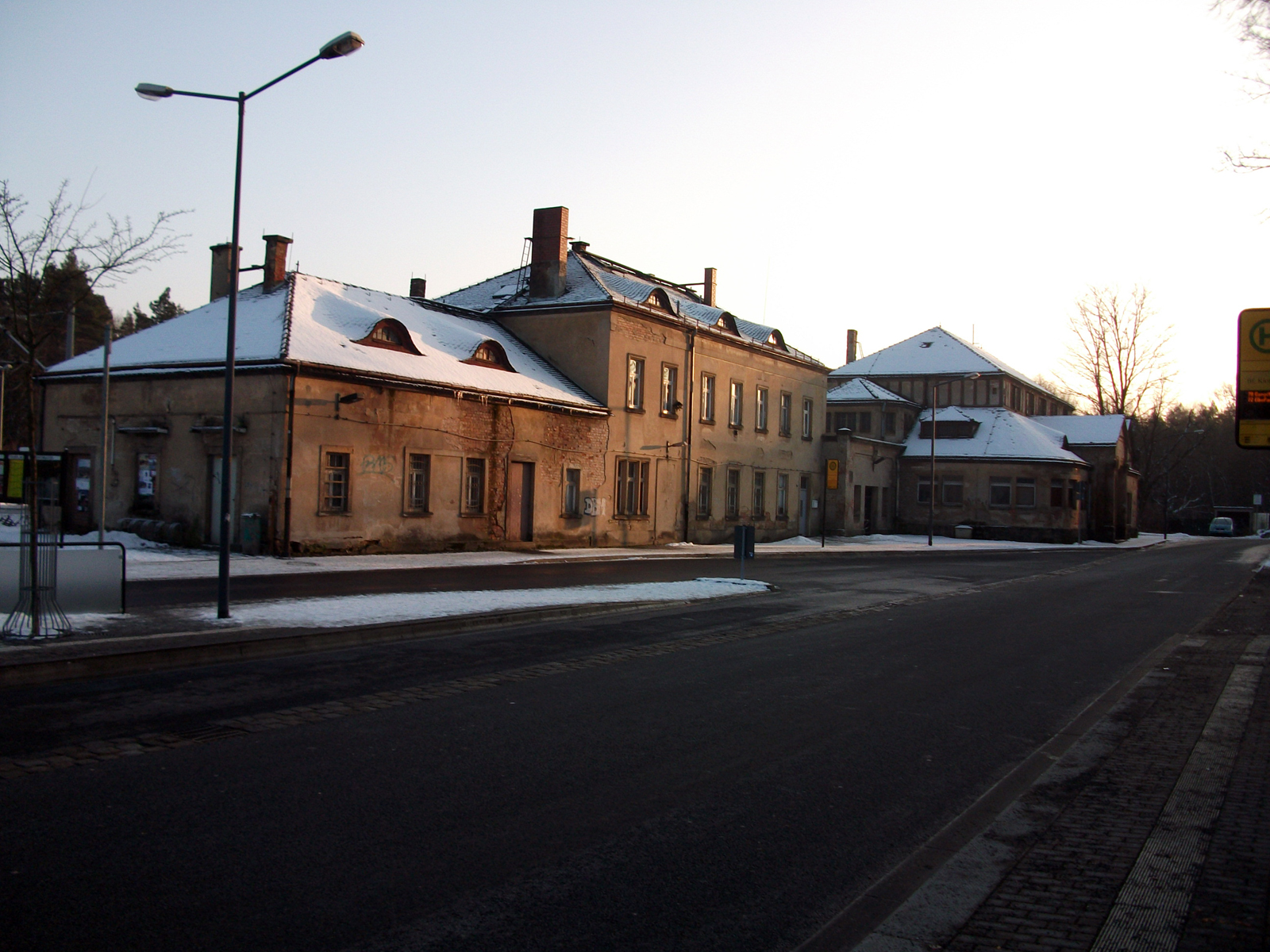
- Dresden-Klotzsche station before 2016 renovation

General information
- Location: Dresden-Klotzsche, Saxony; Germany
- Coordinates: 51°06′52″N 13°47′19″E
- Lines: Görlitz–Dresden; Dresden-Klotzsche–Königsbrück; Dresden-Klotzsche–Dresden Airport
- Platforms: 4
- Tracks: 4

Construction
- Accessible: Yes

Other information
- Station code: 1351
- DS100 code: DKT
- IBNR: 8010088
- Category: 4
- Website: www.bahnhof.de

History
- Opened: 1 September 1875
- Former names: Klotzsche-Königswald

Services
Preceding station	Trilex	Following station
Dresden-Neustadt towards Dresden Hbf	RE 1	Radeberg towards Zgorzelec
Dresden-Neustadt towards Dresden Hbf	RE 2	Radeberg towards Liberec
Dresden Industriegelände towards Dresden Hbf	RB 60	Langebrück towards Görlitz
Dresden Industriegelände towards Dresden Hbf	RB 61	Langebrück towards Zittau
Preceding station	DB Regio Südost	Following station
Dresden Industriegelände towards Dresden-Neustadt	RB 33	Weixdorf Bad towards Königsbrück
Preceding station	Dresden S-Bahn	Following station
Dresden Grenzstraße towards Dresden Flughafen	S 2	Dresden Industriegelände towards Pirna
Dresden Industriegelände towards Dresden Hbf	S 8	Langebrück towards Kamenz (Sachs)
Location

Dresden-Klotzsche station (German: Bahnhof Dresden-Klotzsche) is a railway station in the town of Klotzsche, Saxony, Germany. The station lies on the Görlitz–Dresden railway, Dresden-Klotzsche–Königsbrück railway and Dresden-Klotzsche–Dresden Flughafen railway.

== History ==
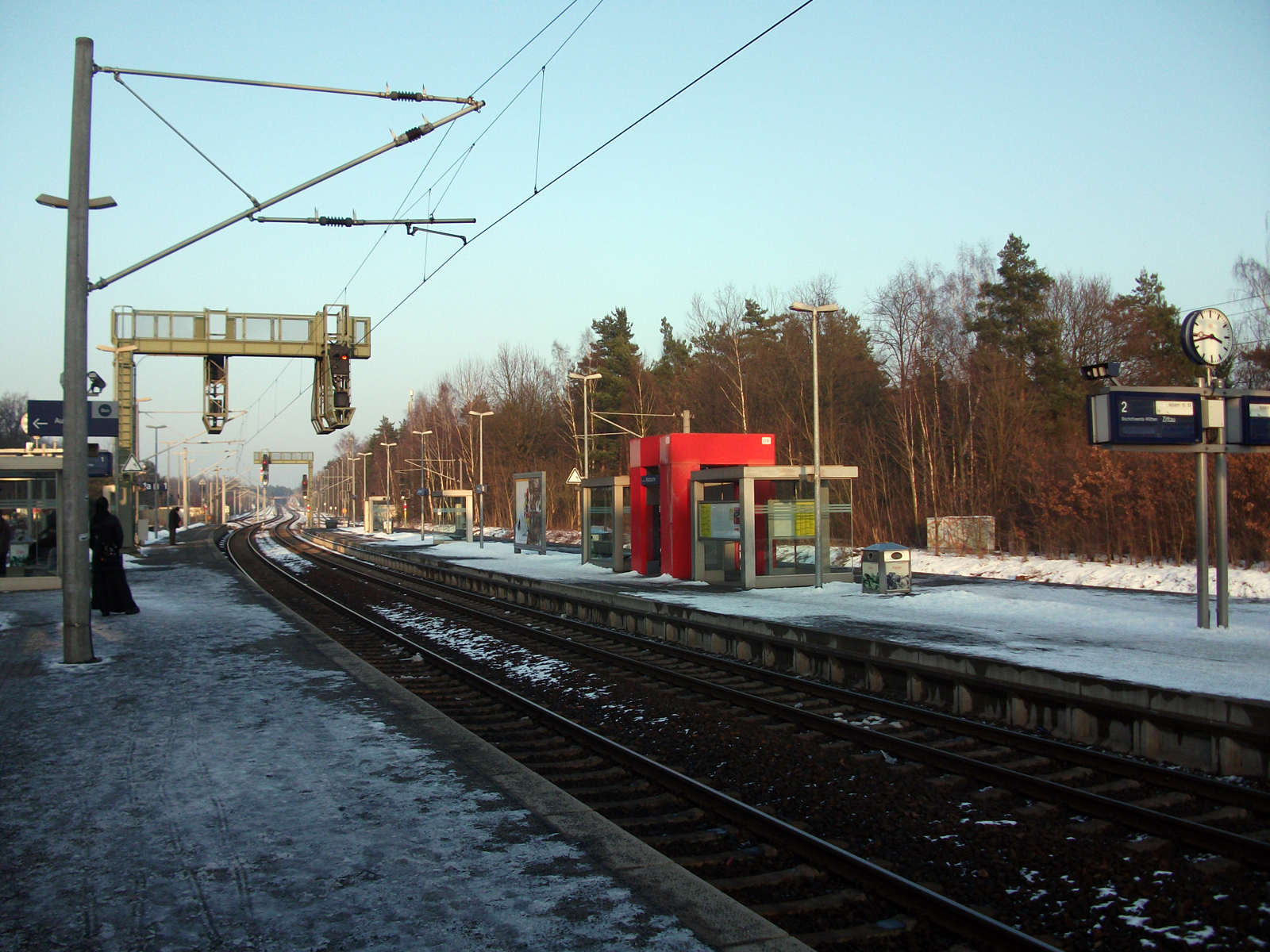
Platforms

In the early decades since the opening of the Görlitz–Dresden railway by the Saxon-Silesian Railway Company (German: Sächsisch-Schlesische Eisenbahngesellschaft) in the first part of 1845, trains ran past Klotzsche. In 1873, the Royal Saxon State Railways (which had taken over the company in 1851) was directed to build Klotzsche-Königswald station, so that the royal family's summer trips to the Dresden Heath (Dresdner Heide) could start by train to Klotzsche. The station was named after the locality that developed a little later into the villa estate of Königswald.

From 1884, the narrow gauge railway to Königsbrück had its terminus on the station forecourt. For freight transport it used a forerunner of the modern container system, known as Umsetzkästen. A gantry crane in Klotzsche station allowed the transshipment of goods between standard and narrow gauge wagons. In particular, pottery from the Königsbrück area could be reloaded very carefully. After 13 years of operation, the line was converted to standard gauge and it connected with the existing Dresden–Görlitz railway to the north of the station. Until 1945, this connection was grade-separated.

In 1907 the section from Dresden-Neustadt to Klotzsche was upgraded to three tracks. The current station building and track layout were built as part of the project. A branch line to Weißig-Bühlau, which was also projected at that time, only reached the planning stage. It would have run on a in a sharp curve immediately north of the station through the Prießnitz valley and produce a link at its destination with the Dürrröhrsdorf–Weißig railway.

Since March 2001, the Dresden S-Bahn has run via Klotzsche station to Dresden Airport station. As part of the works required for the upgrade of S-Bahn services, the 170 metre-long island platform was rehabilitated and access for the disabled was created. A flying junction was built to the north of the station to allow grade-separated operations to the airport. The line from Dresden-Neustadt to Dresden Airport was electrified in 2002 and 2003. Only the tracks at Dresden-Klotzsche station that are necessary for the electrical operations to and from the airport are electrified, but the masts are prepared to allow the extension of the catenary on the main line.

Work was carried out to August 2004 to improve access for various modes of transport at the station. Since then there have been a bus stop with disabled access, a commuter car park and 68 parking spaces for bicycle.

In the spring of 2015, renovation work began on the heritage-listed station building, which until then had been left to decay. A local company that has bought the building and operates an organic supermarket with a bistro in it. The company has also rented part of the building to other operators.

== Train services ==
The station is served by several suburban, local and regional services., which are operated by DB Regio Südost and Vogtlandbahn.
