= Dresden-Klotzsche–Dresden Airport railway =

Railway line in Dresden, Germany

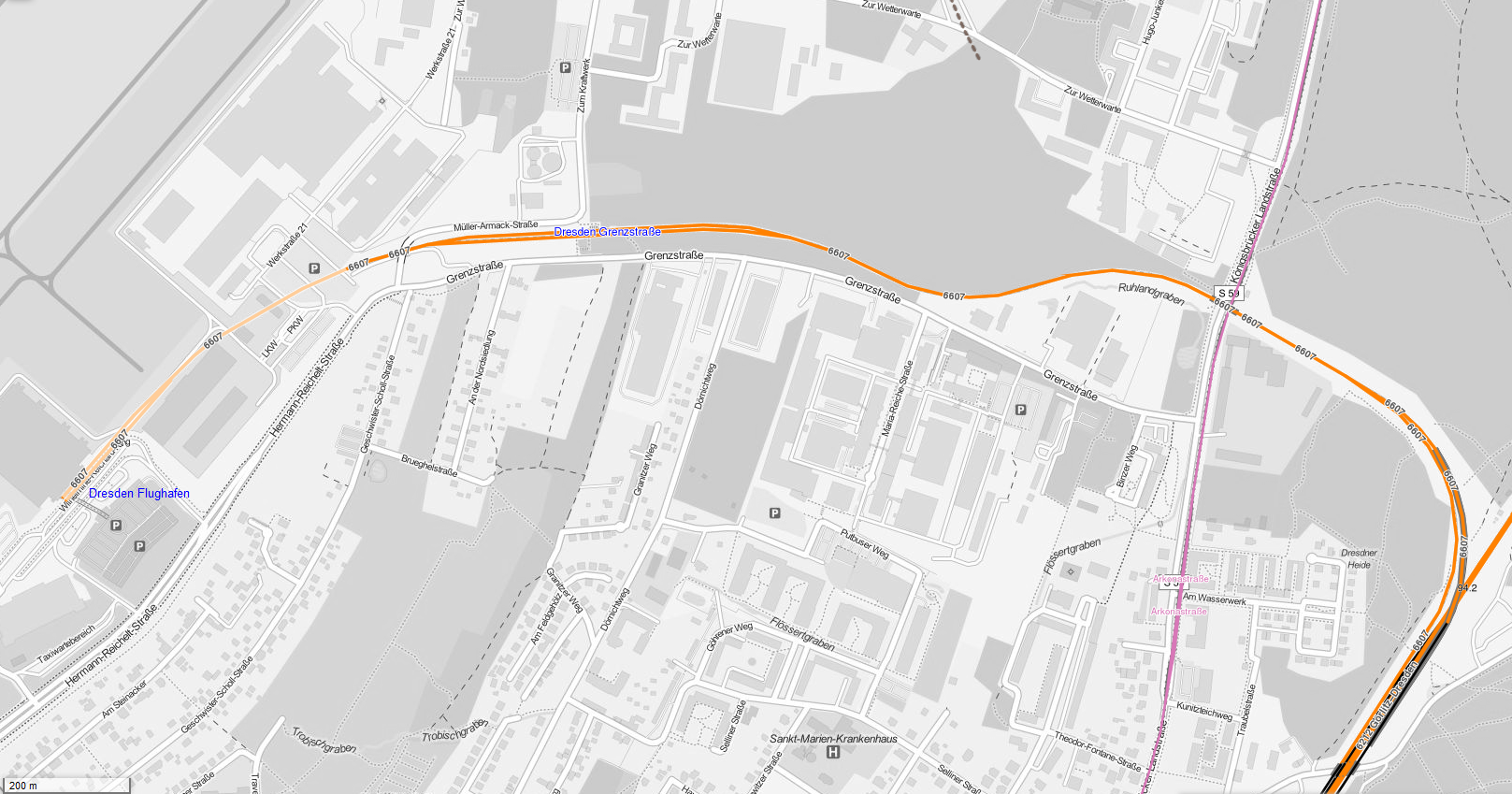

Overview
- Line number: 6607
- Locale: Saxony, Germany
- Termini: Dresden-Klotzsche; Dresden Airport

Service
- Route number: 241.2

Technical
- Line length: 4.12 km (2.56 mi)
- Track gauge: 1,435 mm (4 ft 8 1/2 in) standard gauge
- Electrification: 15 kV/16.7 Hz AC overhead catenary
- Operating speed: 60 km/h (37.3 mph) (maximum)

The Dresden-Klotzsche–Dresden Airport railway is a single-track, electrified main line in Saxony, Germany. It runs from Dresden-Klotzsche station on the Görlitz–Dresden railway to Dresden Airport and today it is served exclusively by the Dresden S-Bahn.

== History ==
The railway to Dresden Airport developed from a siding to the Air War School Klotzsche, which was finished in 1936. Its construction was started after the opening of the airport in Dresden in July 1935. A three kilometre-long railway siding, which had its terminus near the current Dresden-Nord interchange between the Autobahn 4 and the Autobahn 13, was built in 1934 to supply the area.

The former railway siding was rebuilt as a railway with the establishment of the aviation industry in Dresden from 1955. A station was opened at Grenzstraße for the peak hour services to the Aircraft Works (Flugzeugwerke). The passenger trains running to meet the works’ shift changes could also be used by the public from 1966.

From 1972, double-deck push-pull trains operated to Dresden Grenzstraße to cope with the extensive commuter traffic for the first time. These trains mostly ran to and from Pirna, but some also ran to Altenberg.

After the reunification of Germany in 1990, passenger numbers at Grenzstraße decreased greatly during the peak. At the same time, the redevelopment of Dresden Airport as a major regional airport started. This meant that the issue of an efficient transport connection to it was considered. In September 1997, planning began for the extension of the railway line to the new terminal, which was to be established in a former aircraft assembly plant north of the old terminal. The last passenger trains on the old line ran on 22 May 1998.

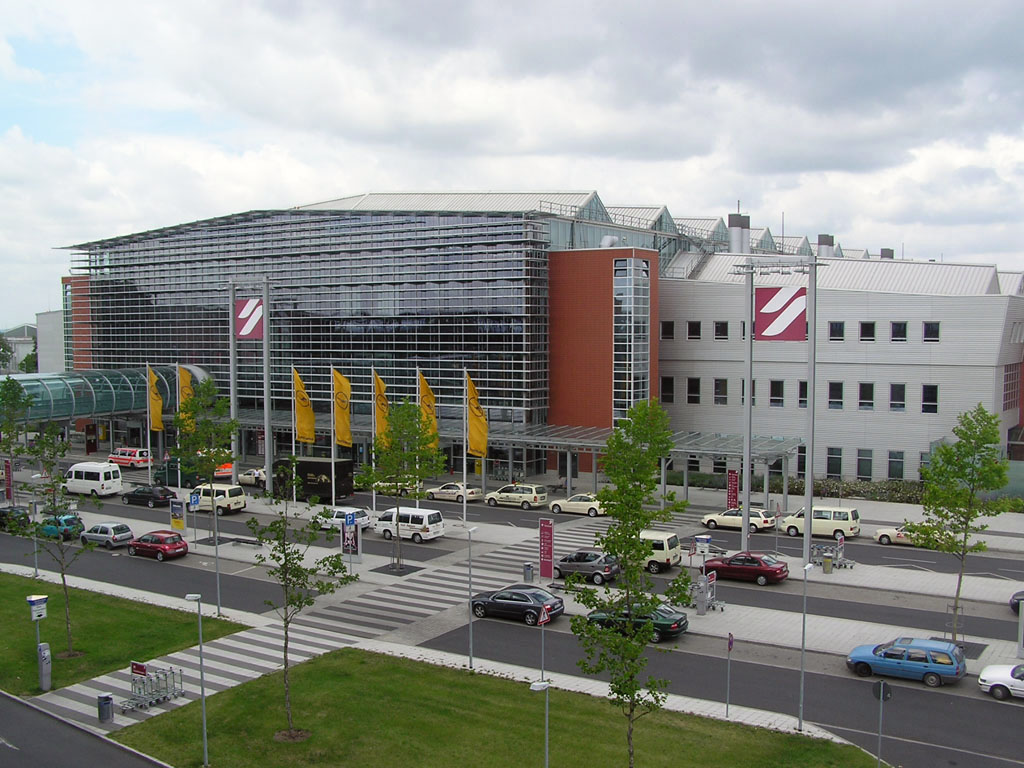
Terminal 1 of the airport seen from the parking garage. The station is underground and directly in front of the building (2005)

Construction began on connecting the airport to the S-Bahn network on 30 July 1998. The precast concrete tunnel was completed in the summer of 1999. A 200 m-long flying junction for traffic approaching the airport via the Dresden-Görlitz railway was built at Dresden-Klotzsche station and a junction with two new electrified tracks was built for traffic to and from the airport. The total projected cost amounted to 84.3 million Deutsche Marks and was funded by the Free State of Saxony On 25 March 2001, the new line was opened simultaneously with new Terminal 1 at the airport. Until the completion of the Leipzig City Tunnel the Dresden Airport station was the only underground station in Saxony.

Since its opening, the line has been operated as line S2 of the Dresden S-Bahn. Trains run every 30-minute intervals towards Dresden Hauptbahnhof and on weekdays continue to Heidenau and Pirna.

== Development options ==
Under the Dresden land-use plan that has been in force since the end of 1996, routes for both a connecting curve to the north of Dresden-Klotzsche station and an extension of the line towards Dresden Industriegelände railway station to the southwest of the airport are reserved. If these plans are implemented, it would be possible, for example, for trains to continue to east Saxony without reversing at the airport.

The zoning plan includes an option for an additional station on the existing line near Königsbrücker Landstraße to enable interchange. This would allow connections to Dresden tram line 7 at the Industriepark Klotzsche stop and urban and regional bus services.

However, there are no concrete plans to implement these ideas.

== Stations ==
Dresden-Klotzsche

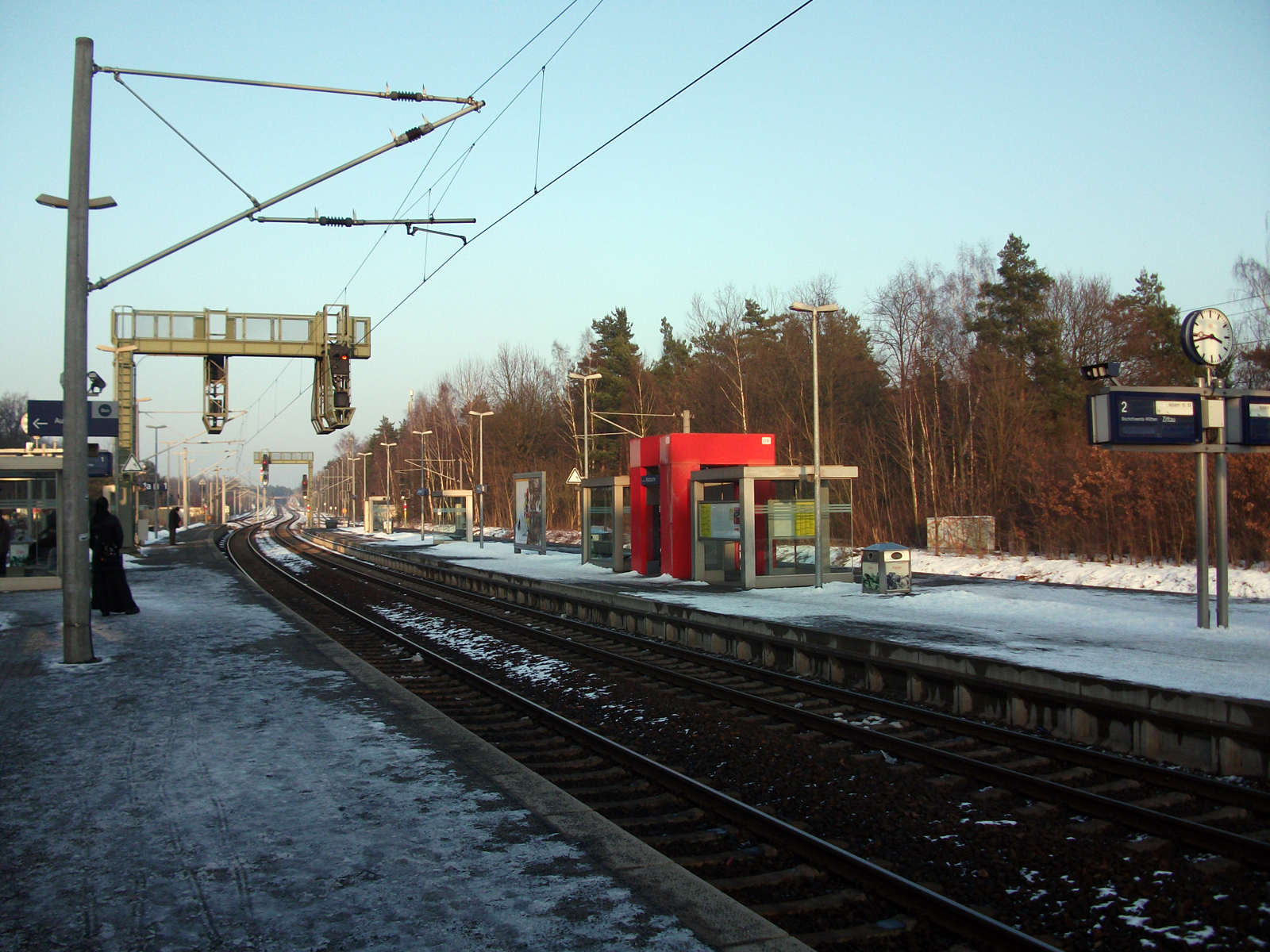
Dresden-Klotzsche station (2011)

Dresden-Klotzsche station was opened on the Görlitz–Dresden railway in 1873 under the name of Klotzsche-Königswald. With the opening of the narrow-gauge railway to Königsbrück in 1884, Klotzsche became a railway junction. The line was later converted to standard gauge.

Dresden-Klotzsche station is now an important regional station in northern Dresden. Convenient transfer connections consist in particular from Regional-Express services from Görlitz and Zittau to Dresden S-Bahn line 2 services and to buses. There are no longer any freight facilities.

Dresden Grenzstraße

Dresden Grenzstraße station is mainly used for handling traffic commuting to the nearby businesses. Two trains can cross at the station, although this rarely happens. In rare cases, the station acts as a terminus when the airport tunnel is blocked.

Dresden Airport

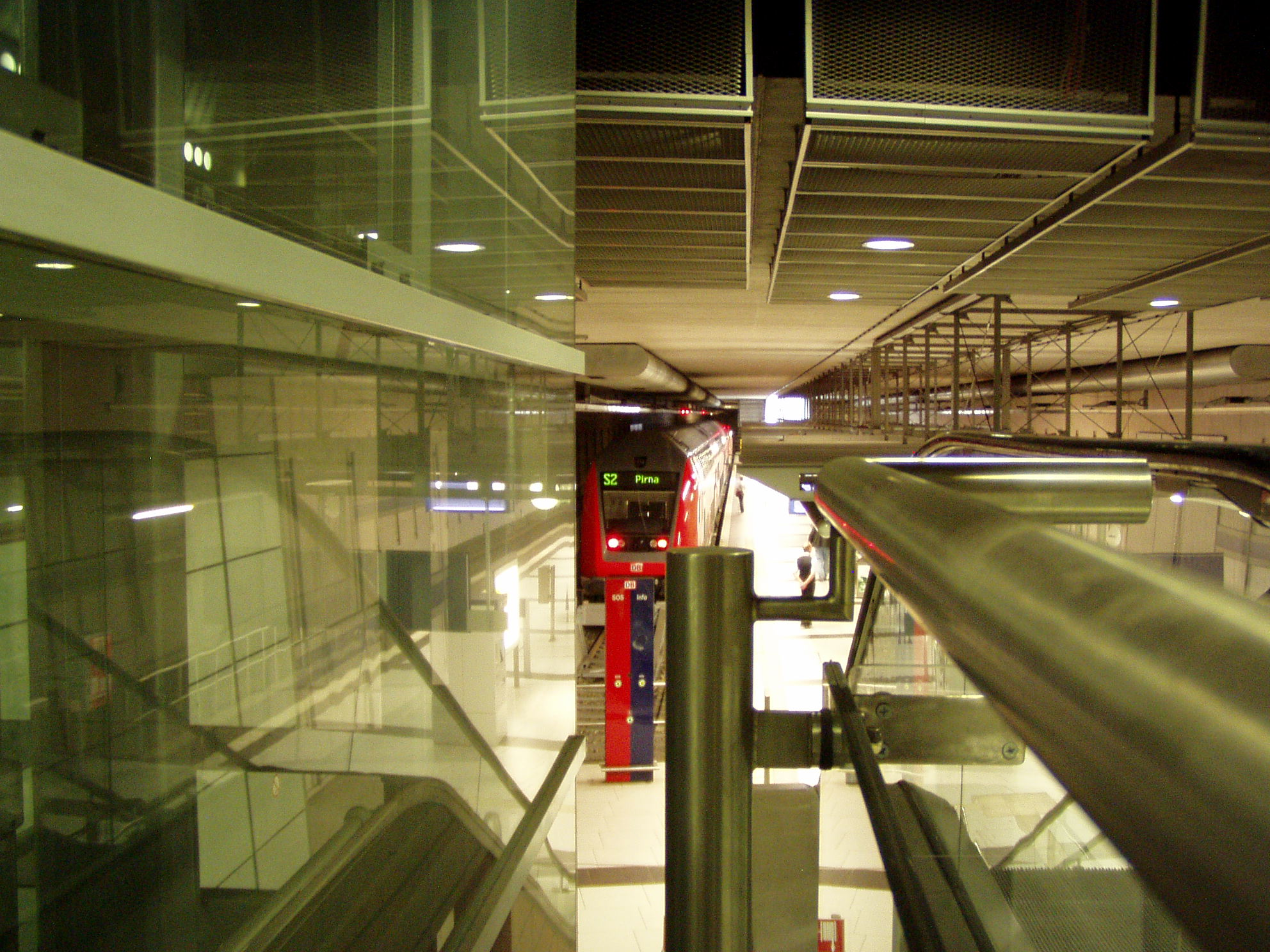
Dresden Airport station (2008)

Dresden Airport station was the eighth airport station built in Germany and the first underground station in Saxony. It was opened on 25 March 2001.

The station is located on the second basement level of the terminal (level -2) and is reached only from the terminal via two escalators. Like all stations newly built for the Dresden S-Bahn, it has a usable platform length of 140 metres; this is located on an island between the two terminating tracks.

== Rolling stock ==
The line was first operated (from 2001 to 2004) with low-floor diesel Siemens Desiro Classic railcars of class 642. It has since been operated with trains with double-deck carriages in push–pull mode and hauled by a class 143 electric locomotive. Only trains with emergency brake override are allowed to operate in the airport tunnel. A fire alarm system was also installed on the class 143 locomotives.
