= Transport in Dresden =

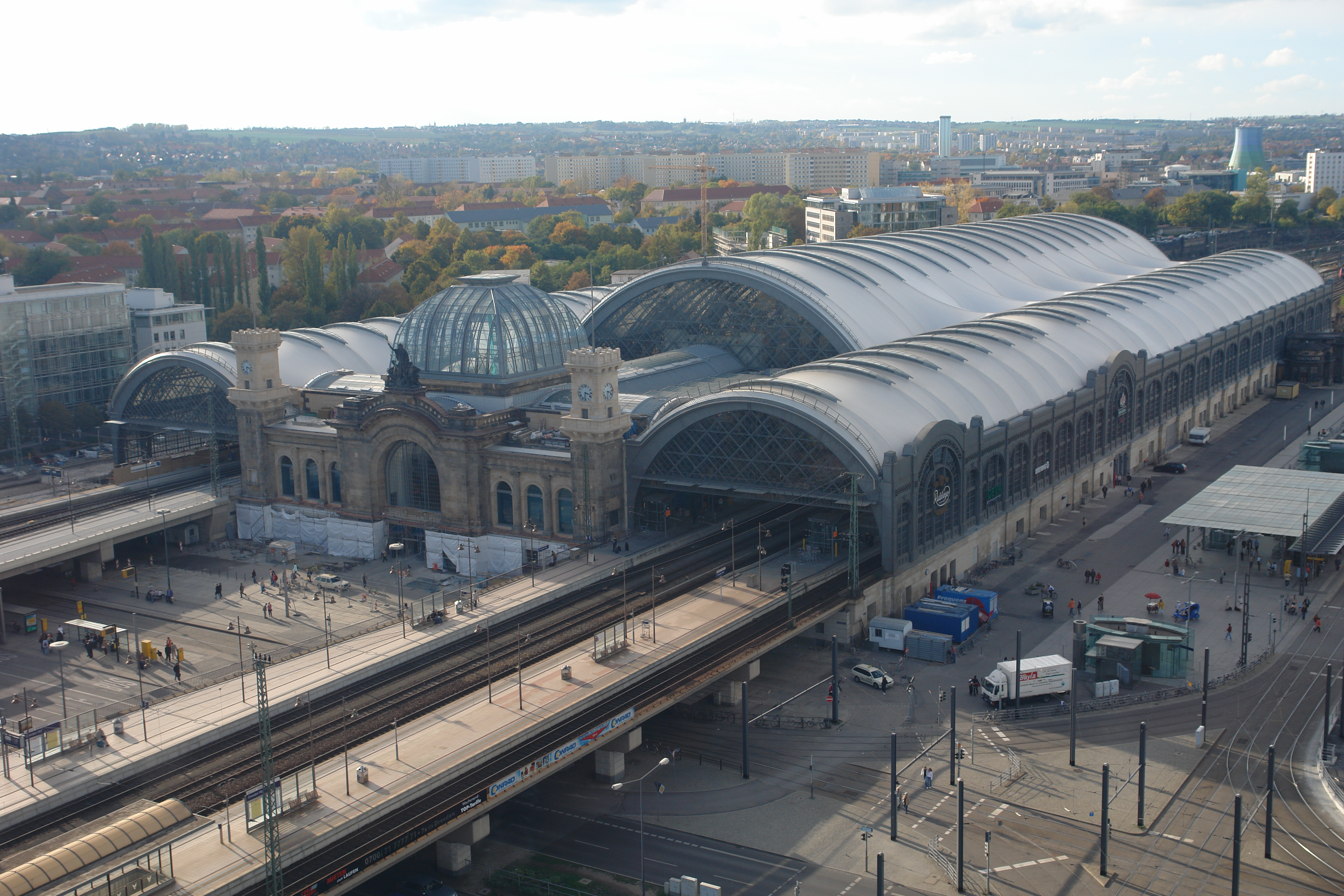
Dresden Hauptbahnhof

Dresden is a major German city and capital of Saxony. It is a road, train and air transport hub in eastern Germany. Local and commuter transport services grant accessibility in the Dresden agglomeration. The city has a dense network of tram and bus lines. Dresden has two major train stations, an international airport and an inner harbour on the Elbe river waterway. Autobahns grant access to all cardinal directions. Dresden is the junction of two class-A European routes.

Dresden is also an international centre of traffic and transport science.

== Road ==
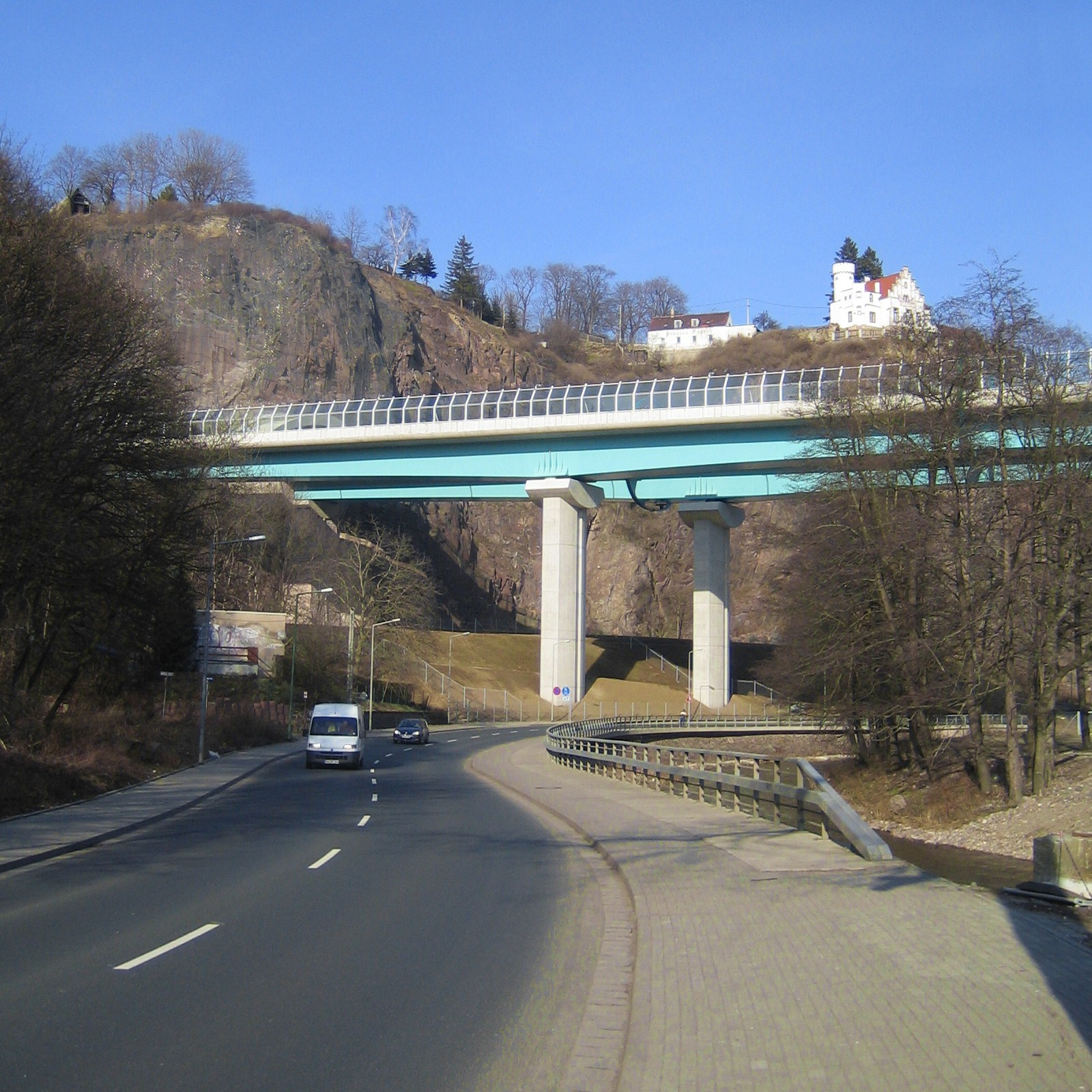
Bundesautobahn 17 crossing the Weißeritz valley in southern Dresden

The Bundesautobahn 4 (European route E40) crosses Dresden in the northwest. Along the A4 motorway, Dresden has five exits. The A4 connects Dresden with Chemnitz and Frankfurt, and the A14 connects Leipzig and Hanover.

The Bundesautobahn 17 leaves the A4 at the three-junction interchange "Dresden-West" in a south-eastern direction. In Dresden, it begins to cross the Ore Mountains towards Prague and provides three exits in the southern parts of Dresden. The Bundesautobahn 13 leaves from the three-point interchange "Dresden-Nord" and goes to Berlin. The A13 and the A17 are on the European route E55.

Bundesstraße roads crossing or running through Dresden are:

- Bundesstraße 6 (Cuxhaven - Görlitz at the border to Poland)
- Bundesstraße 97 (Dresden - Guben at the border to Poland)
- Bundesstraße 170 (Dresden - Zinnwald-Georgenfeld at the border to the Czech Republic)
- Bundesstraße 172 (Dresden - Bad Schandau at the border to the Czech Republic)
- Bundesstraße 173 (Dresden - Bamberg)

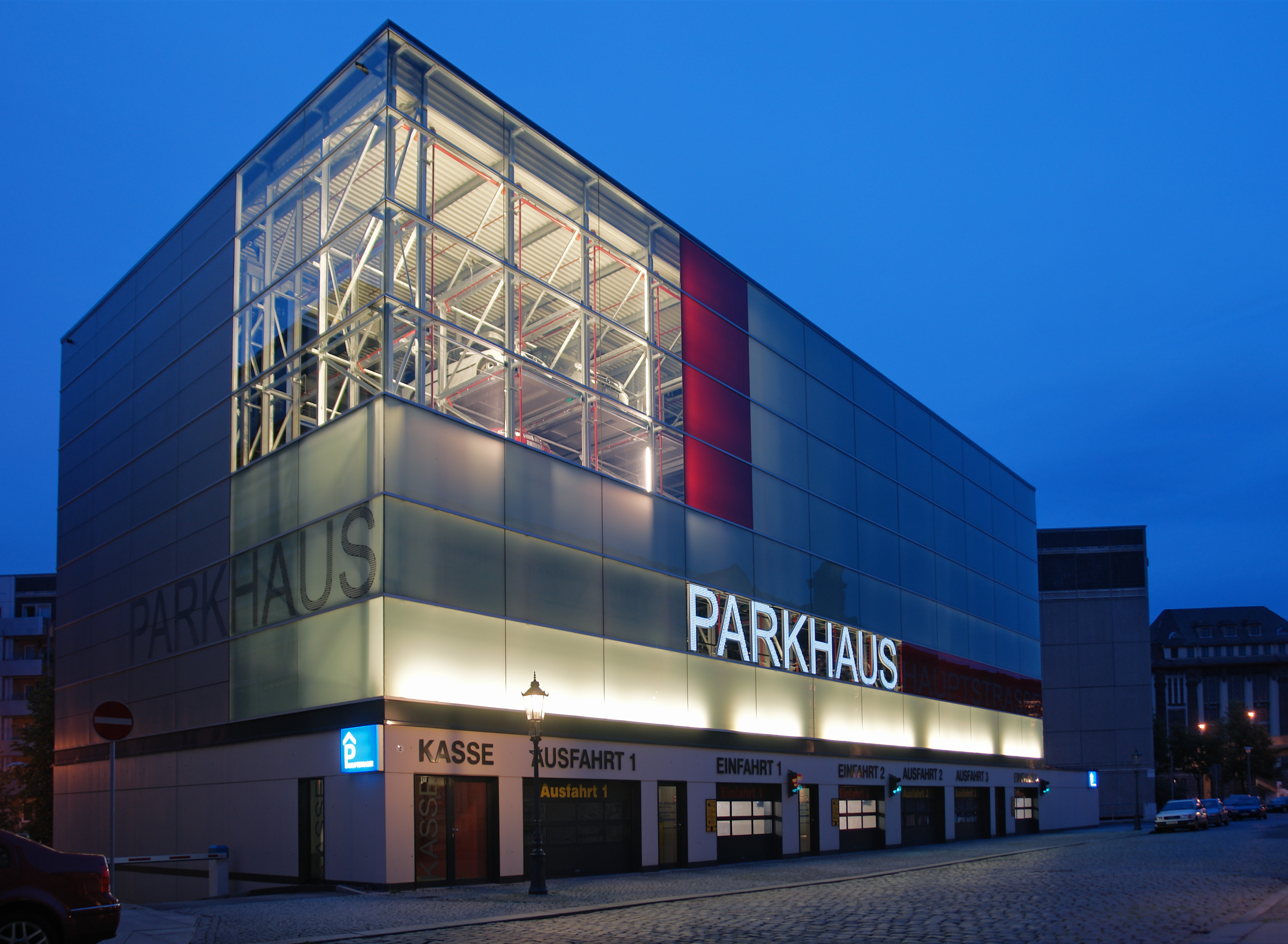
Automated parking garage

== Railway ==
The network of the Dresden S-Bahn

There are two main inter-city transit hubs in the railway network in Dresden: Dresden Hauptbahnhof is the largest station in the city granting access to the network to the southern parts include the Altstadt. Dresden-Neustadt railway station is located to the north of the river Elbe. The most important railway lines run to Berlin, Prague, Leipzig and Chemnitz.

A commuter train system (Dresden S-Bahn) operates on three lines alongside the long-distance routes.

Other stations in Dresden include: Dresden-Friedrichstadt, Dresden Mitte, Dresden Airport and Dresden Industriegelände.

== Airport ==
Dresden Airport is the international airport of Dresden, located at the north-western outskirts of the town in the district of Klotzsche. After German reunification the airport's infrastructure has been considerably improved. In 1998, a motorway access route was opened. In March 2001, a new terminal building was opened along with the underground S-Bahn station Dresden Flughafen, a multi-storey car park and a new aircraft handling ramp. The only runway of the airport was extended to 2,800 metre. Most of the scheduled flights are domestic flights for example to Munich, Frankfurt or Düsseldorf while there are also some daily international lines to Vienna, Zurich and London Heathrow.

The airport hosts the EADS Elbe Flugzeugwerke which is the EADS-centre of reverting Airbus passenger planes to freighter planes. The Elbe Flugzeugwerke are the largest plant of aircraft industry in eastern Germany.

== Public local transport ==
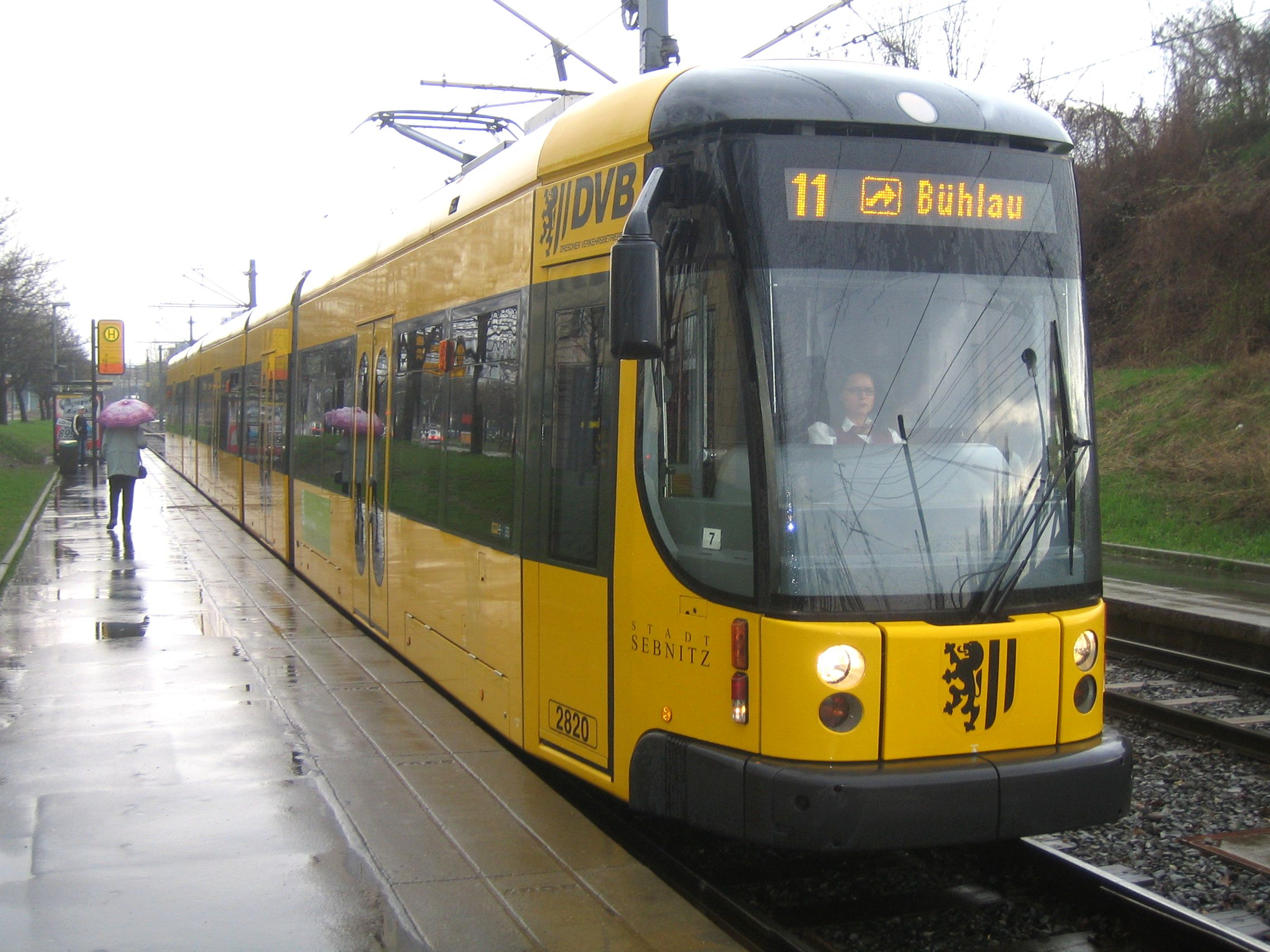
The longest trams in Dresden set a record in length

Light rail/tramway network of Dresden

Dresden has a large tramway network that is operated by the Dresdner Verkehrsbetriebe (DVB). The origins of the Dresden tramway can be traced back to the year 1872, when the first horse-drawn line opened between the city centre and the former village of Blasewitz, now a borough of Dresden.

The tramway system is the backbone of public transport in Dresden. DVB operate twelve routes on a 200 km network. On the major lines through the inner city, where different routes intertwine, vehicles run up to every two minutes. Different routes can be identified by a route number scheme, which also extends to local and regional bus services, as well as a colour code which has by now only been applied to the official network diagram of DVB. On all tramway routes, a general 10-minute headway is offered on weekdays, extending to 15 minutes on Saturday, Sunday and in the evening. The system boasts a daily 24 hour service.

The fleet is being renewed to replace the ageing Czech Tatra trams. Today many of the low floor vehicles are up to 45 metres long and manufactured by Bombardier Transportation in Bautzen. The newest trams are vehicles of the Flexity Classic XXL series that are adjusted to the topography of Dresden.

The Dresden tramway is a mixed system of traditional street running, especially in the inner city boroughs close to the city centre, and modern light rail. While many tracks in the system are on separated roadbeds (often with grass grown around them to avoid noise) some tracks are still placed on the streets in the midst of individual traffic. Contrary to many other German cities of comparable size, no tunnel sections exist.

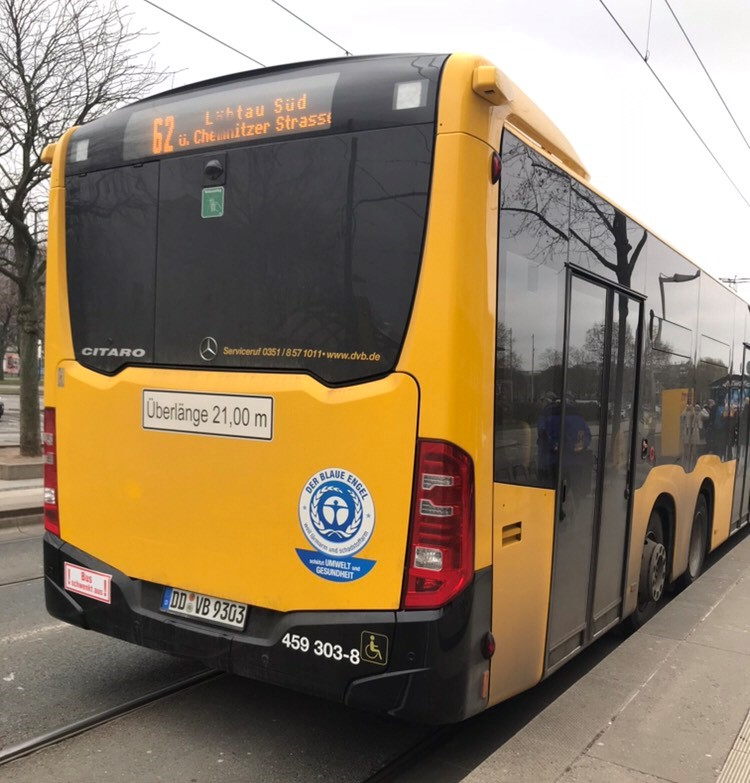
A Mercedes-Benz Citaro bus of Dresden transportation, bound for Löbtau Süd

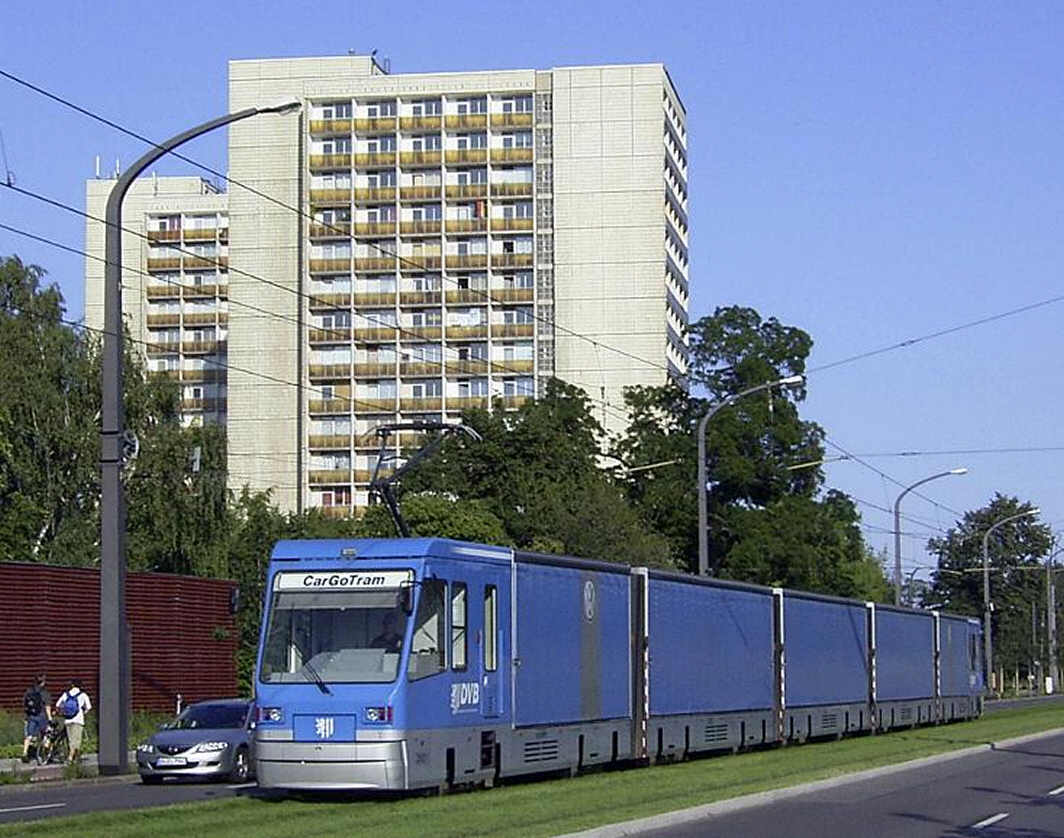
CarGoTram

In recent years, street running has been replaced by independent right-of-way arrangements wherever possible. Many stations are now fully accessible to physically disabled people, in compliance with the purchase of low floor rolling stock.

The CarGoTram was a tram that supplied Volkswagen's Transparent Factory, crossing the city. The two trams, up to 60 meters long, was the longest vehicles allowed to use roads in Dresden. The connection by tram was established to reduce the number of trucks used. The transparent factory is located not far from the city centre next to the city's largest park.

DVB provide a night service named GuteNachtLinie ('goodnight lines'), which operates Monday-Sunday, although the frequency of the buses is greater on Friday, Saturday and before holidays when the routes run every 30 minutes between 22:45 and 04:45. Postplatz is the most important hub for night-time travel in Dresden. Most GuteNachtLinie routes meet here at the same time to allow people to switch routes.

== Transport science ==
=== History ===
Dresden has a long tradition in transport and traffic science dating back to the 19th century. Scientists of the city's colleges and technical institutes build up one of the world's most densest transport network by designing vessels such as the Saxonia locomotive, facilities such as the Göltzsch Viaduct and security devices. The early success in the rail network was named as a nationwide pattern by Friedrich List's work Über ein sächsisches Eisenbahn-System als Grundlage eines allgemeinen deutschen Eisenbahn-Systems (A Saxon rail system as a basement of a general German rail system) in 1833.

A faculty of traffic and circulation sciences at the Technische Hochschule was founded in 1949 and transformed into an independent University of Transport and Communications in 1952 (Hochschule für Verkehrswesen). The institute is part of the Technische Universität Dresden again since 1992, retransformed into the faculty of traffic and transport sciences. There is also the Fraunhofer Institute for Transportation and Infrastructure Systems close to the faculty's activities in research and development.

Until today the faculty is unique among German university faculties, although there are some universities offering akin courses (for example at Technische Universität Berlin at the faculty of Mechanical Engineering and Transport Systems). The faculty is closely interlocked to the faculties of mechanical engineering and economics as like as to the faculty of electrical engineering and information technology.

=== Current topics ===
- The AutoTram (a partially automated multi-articulated, guided bus)
- Electronic ticketing (tested in the Dresden mass transportation)
- Traffic censoring and status screening
- Intermodal traffic information systems
- Transport in shrinking cities and demographic effects on traffic
- High-speed rail in south-east Europe especially alongside the Pan-European corridor IV
- Traffic effects on environment
- Optimising of traffic efficiency and network resources
- Mobility behaviour and traffic psychology
- Traffic accident research
