= Dresden Grenzstraße station =

Railway station in Dresden, Germany

Dresden Grenzstraße
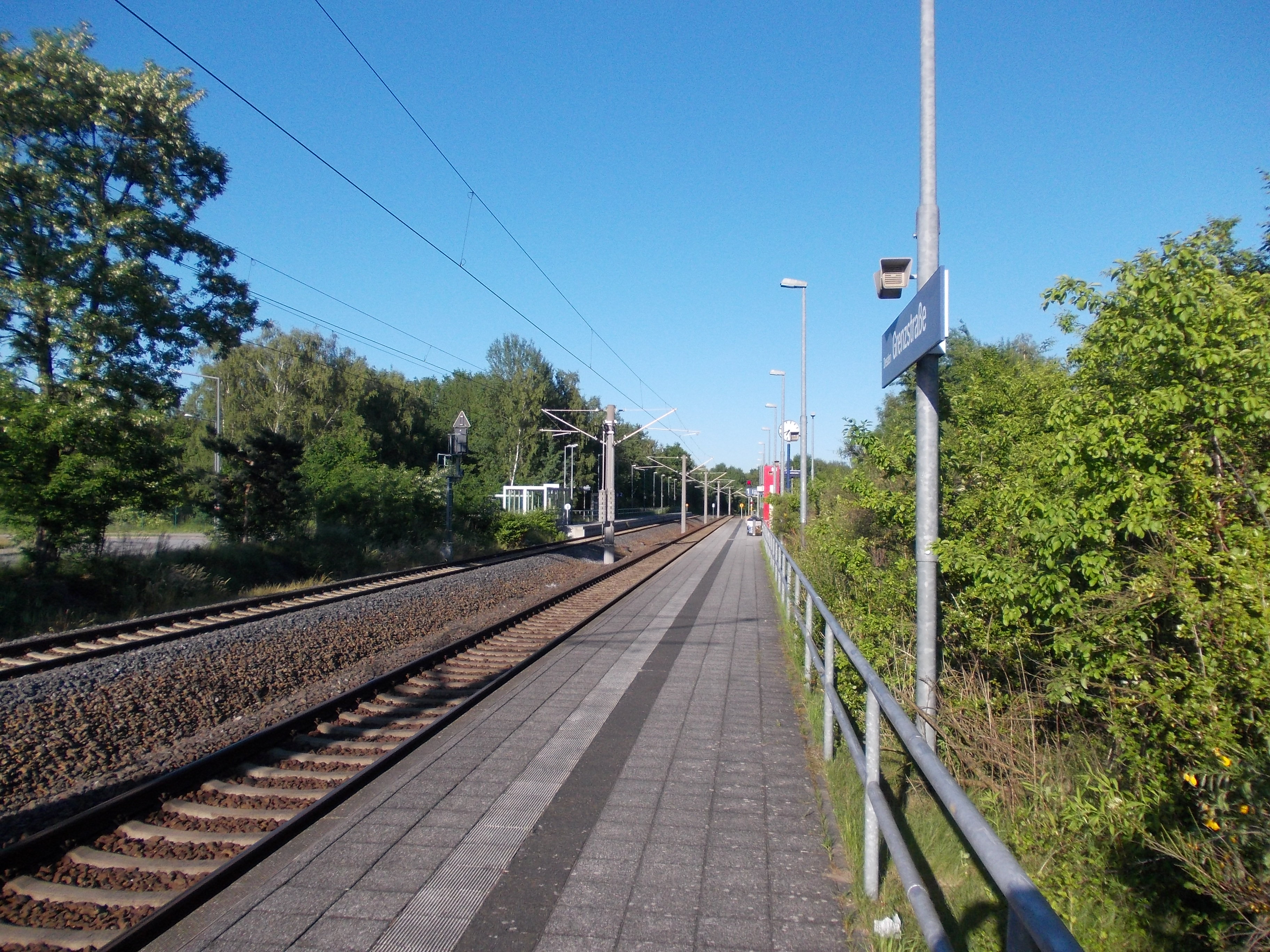
- Dresden Grenzstraße railway station

General information
- Location: Dresden, Saxony; Germany
- Coordinates: 51°07′41″N 13°46′42″E
- Owner: DB Netz
- Operator: DB Station&Service
- Line: Dresden-Klotzsche–Dresden Flughafen
- Platforms: 2 side platforms
- Tracks: 2

Other information
- Station code: 1342
- DS100 code: DGRS
- IBNR: 8011417
- Category: 6
- Fare zone: VVO
- Website: www.bahnhof.de

Services
Preceding station	Dresden S-Bahn	Following station
Dresden Flughafen Terminus	S 2	Dresden-Klotzsche towards Pirna
Location

Dresden Grenzstraße station is a railway station in Dresden-Klotzsche, Germany. The station is located on the Dresden-Klotzsche–Dresden Flughafen railway. The train services are operated by Deutsche Bahn, as part of the Dresden S-Bahn.

== Train services ==
The following services currently call at the station:

- Dresden S-Bahn services S2 Dresden Flughafen – Dresden – Pirna
