= Dresden Industriegelände station =

Railway station in Germany

Dresden Industriegelände
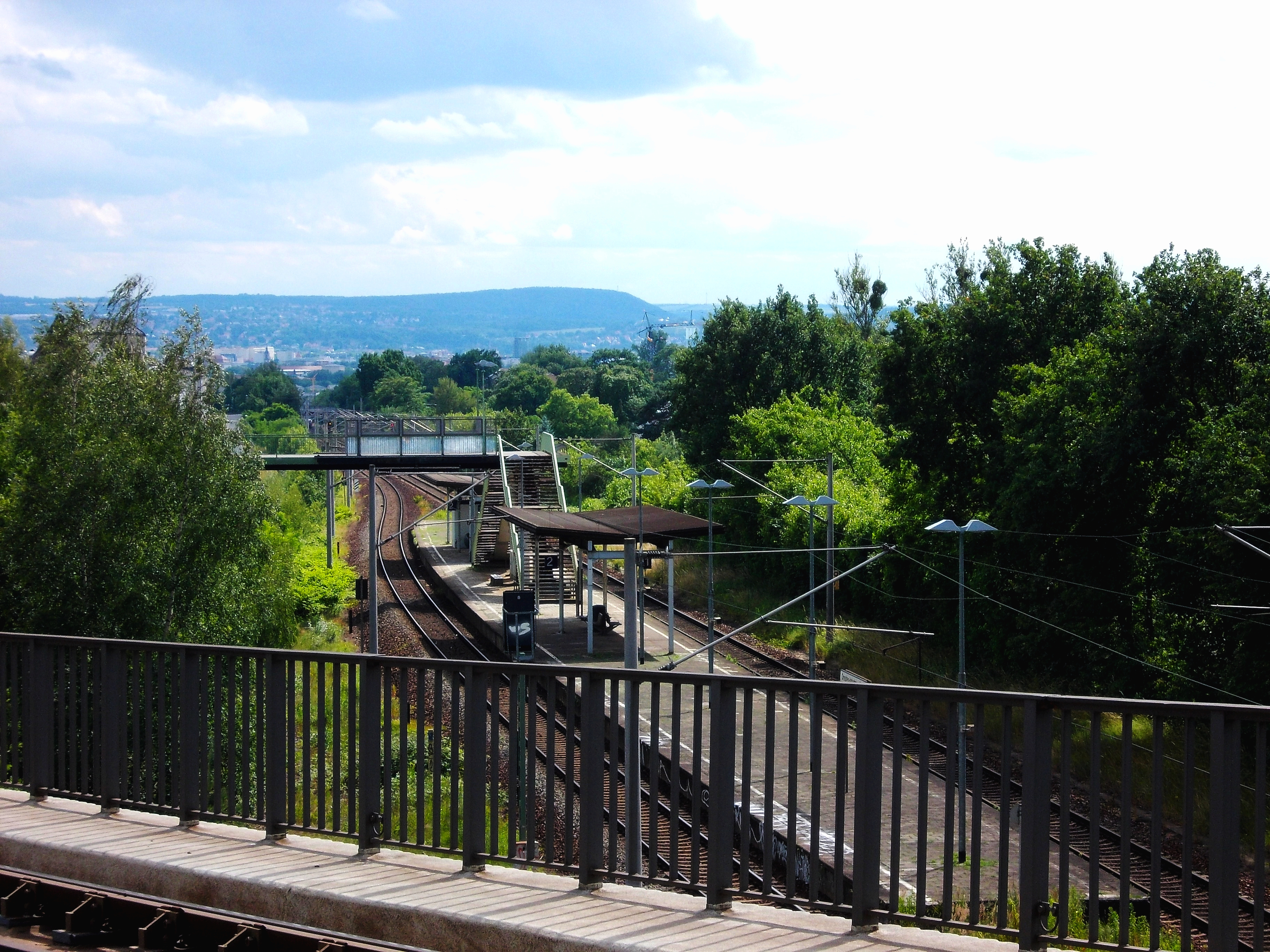
- Dresden Industriegelände railway station

General information
- Location: Dresden, Saxony, Germany
- Coordinates: 51°05′14″N 13°45′45″E
- Owner: DB Netz
- Operator: DB Station&Service
- Line: Görlitz–Dresden railway
- Platforms: 1 island platform
- Tracks: 2

Construction
- Accessible: no

Other information
- Station code: 1344
- DS100 code: DIG
- IBNR: 8011418
- Category: 5
- Fare zone: VVO
- Website: www.bahnhof.de

History
- Opened: 1 October 1897

Services
Preceding station	Trilex	Following station
Dresden-Neustadt towards Dresden Hbf	RB 60	Dresden-Klotzsche towards Görlitz
Dresden-Neustadt towards Dresden Hbf	RB 61	Dresden-Klotzsche towards Zittau
Preceding station	DB Regio Südost	Following station
Dresden-Neustadt Terminus	RB 33	Dresden-Klotzsche towards Königsbrück
Preceding station	Dresden S-Bahn	Following station
Dresden-Klotzsche towards Dresden Flughafen	S 2	Dresden-Neustadt towards Pirna
Dresden-Neustadt towards Dresden Hbf	S 8	Dresden-Klotzsche towards Kamenz (Sachs)
Location

Dresden Industriegelände station (German: Haltepunkt Dresden Industriegelände) is a railway station in the city of Dresden, Saxony, Germany. The station lies on the Görlitz–Dresden railway.

== Train services ==
The station is served by local and suburban services, which are operated by DB Regio Südost and Vogtlandbahn.
