= Königsbrück =

- Town
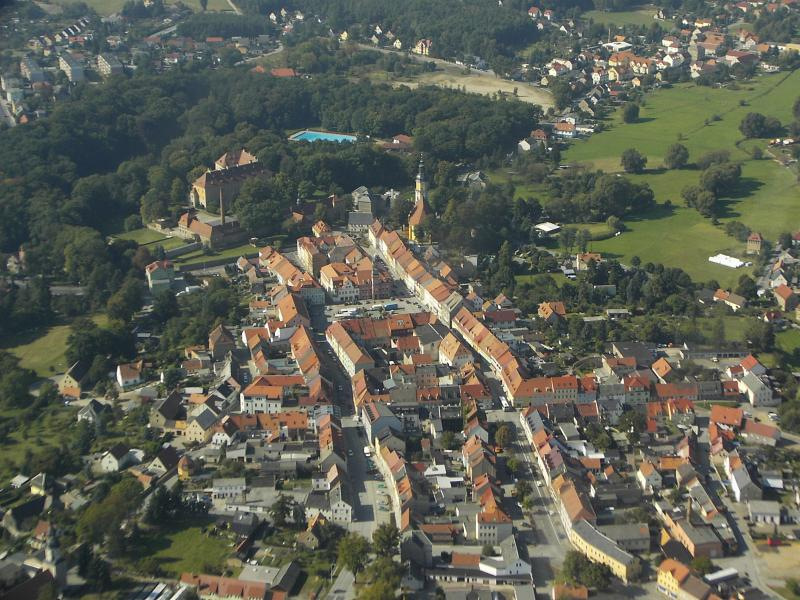

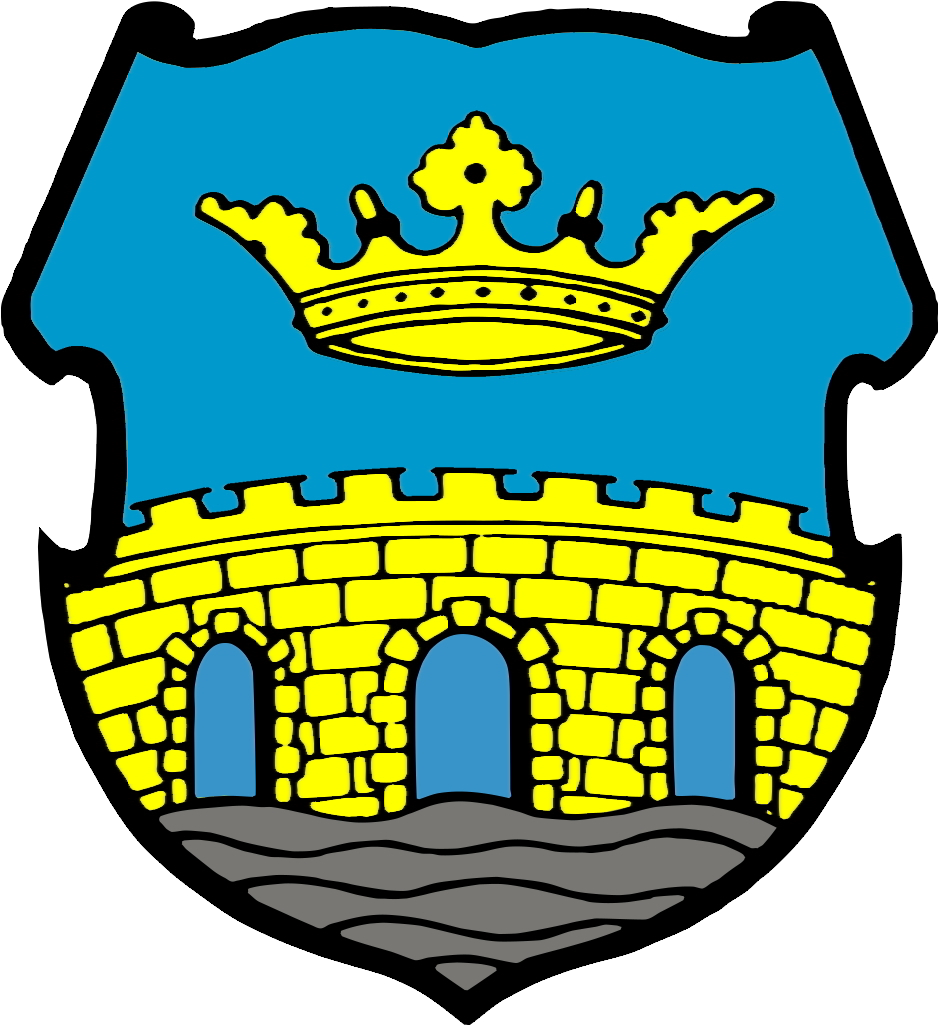
- Coat of arms

- Location of Königsbrück within Bautzen district
- Interactive map of Königsbrück
- Location within Germany Location within Saxony
- Coordinates: 51°15′N 13°53′E
- Country: Germany
- State: Saxony
- District: Bautzen
- Subdivisions: 3

Government
  - Mayor (2022–29): Heiko Driesnack (CDU)

Area
  - Total: 78.48 km^{2} (30.30 sq mi)
- Elevation: 175 m (574 ft)

Population (2025-12-31)
  - Total: 4,642
  - Density: 59.15/km^{2} (153.2/sq mi)
- Time zone: UTC+01:00 (CET)
  - Summer (DST): UTC+02:00 (CEST)
- Postal codes: 01936
- Dialling codes: 035795
- Vehicle registration: BZ, BIW, HY, KM
- Website: www.koenigsbrueck.de

Königsbrück (German pronunciation: [ˌkøːnɪçsˈbʁyk] or [ˌkøːnɪk-]; Upper Sorbian: Kinspork, pronounced [ˈkʲinspɔʁk]) is a town in the Bautzen district, in Saxony, in eastern Germany. It is situated 14 km (8.7 mi) west of Kamenz, and 27 km (17 mi) northeast of the Saxon capital Dresden. Königsbrück is known as the western gate of the historic Upper Lusatia region.

== History ==
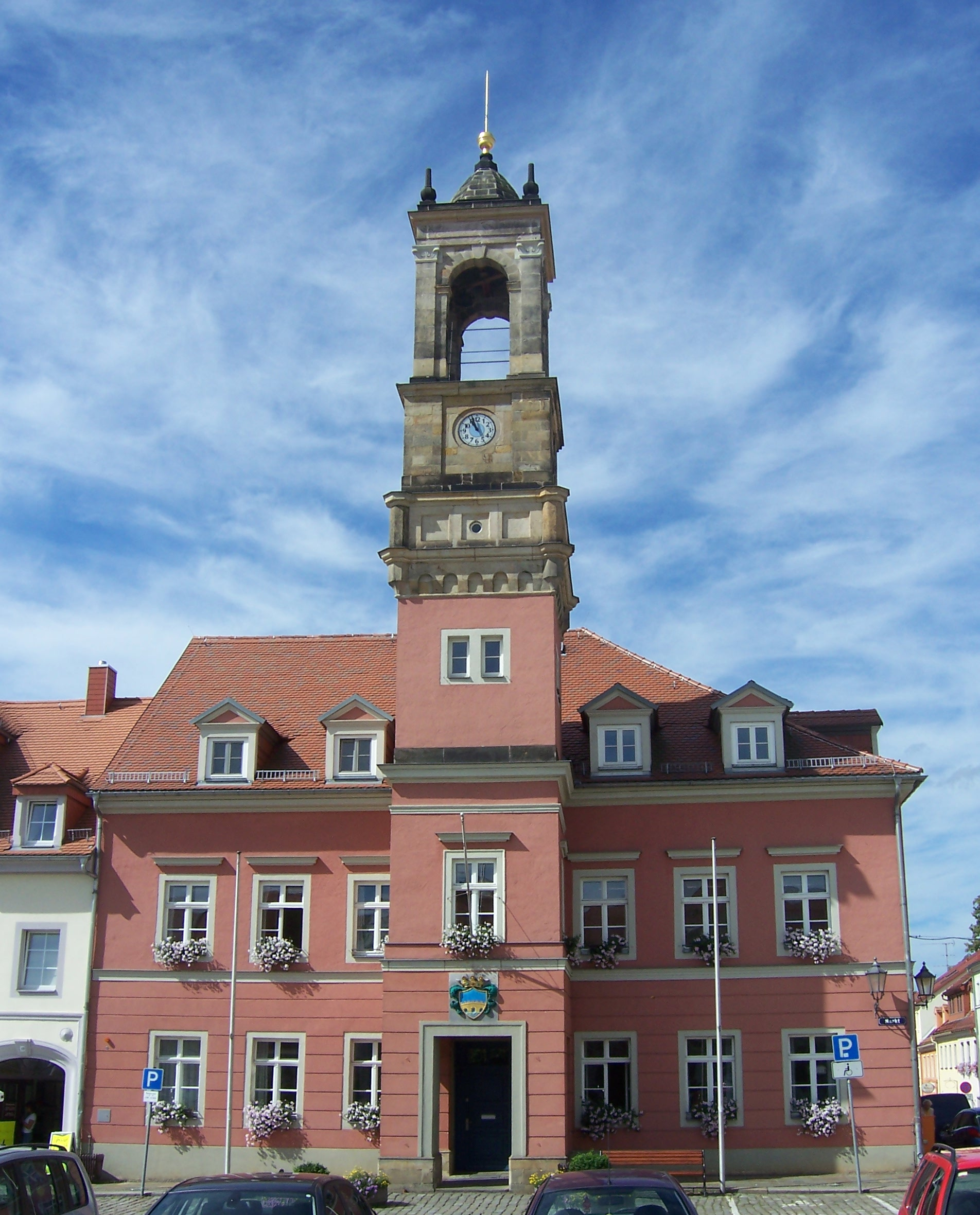
Town hall

First mentioned in 1248 the settlement arose around a fortress in the Bohemian crown land of Upper Lusatia where the Via Regia trade route crossed the border with the Margraviate of Meissen. First mentioned as a town in 1331, Königsbrück from 1562 was the administrative centre of a Bohemian state country (Freie Standesherrschaft), which passed under the suzerainty of the Saxon Electorate according to the 1635 Peace of Prague. One of two main routes connecting Warsaw and Dresden ran through the town in the 18th century and Kings Augustus II the Strong and Augustus III of Poland often traveled that route. In 1906 the Kingdom of Saxony had large proving grounds laid out for the XII (1st Royal Saxon) Corps stationed at Dresden, that after World War II were used by the Soviet Army and finally closed in 1992.

== Transport ==
Königsbrück railway station is located south of the town centre. There are hourly passenger services to Ottendorf-Okrilla and Dresden.

== Notable people ==
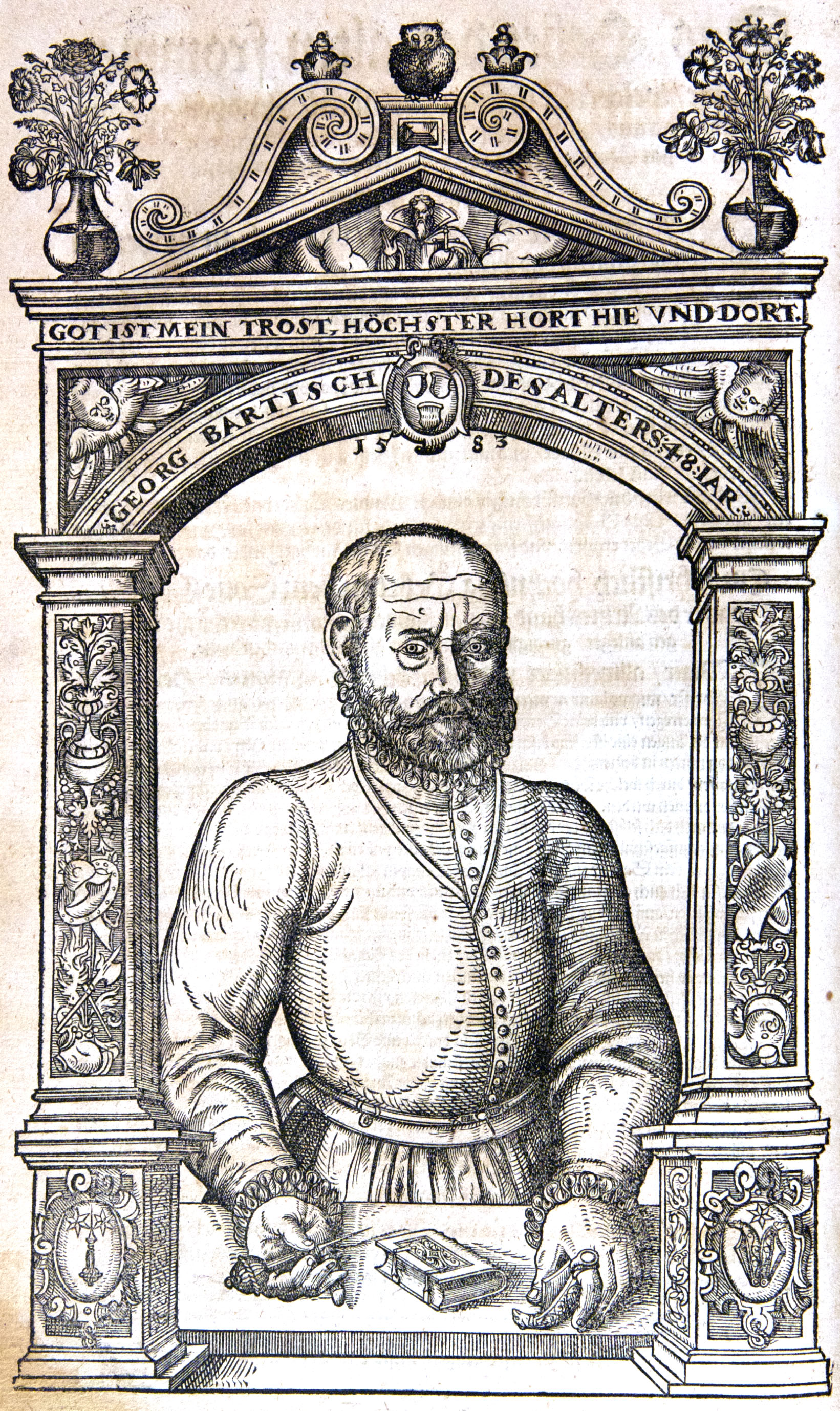
Georg Bartisch (1583)

- Georg Bartisch (1535–1607), physician, ophthalmologist and urologist
- Marvin Stefaniak (born 1995), footballer
