= Görlitz–Dresden railway =

Railway line in Germany

Görlitz–Dresden-Neustadt
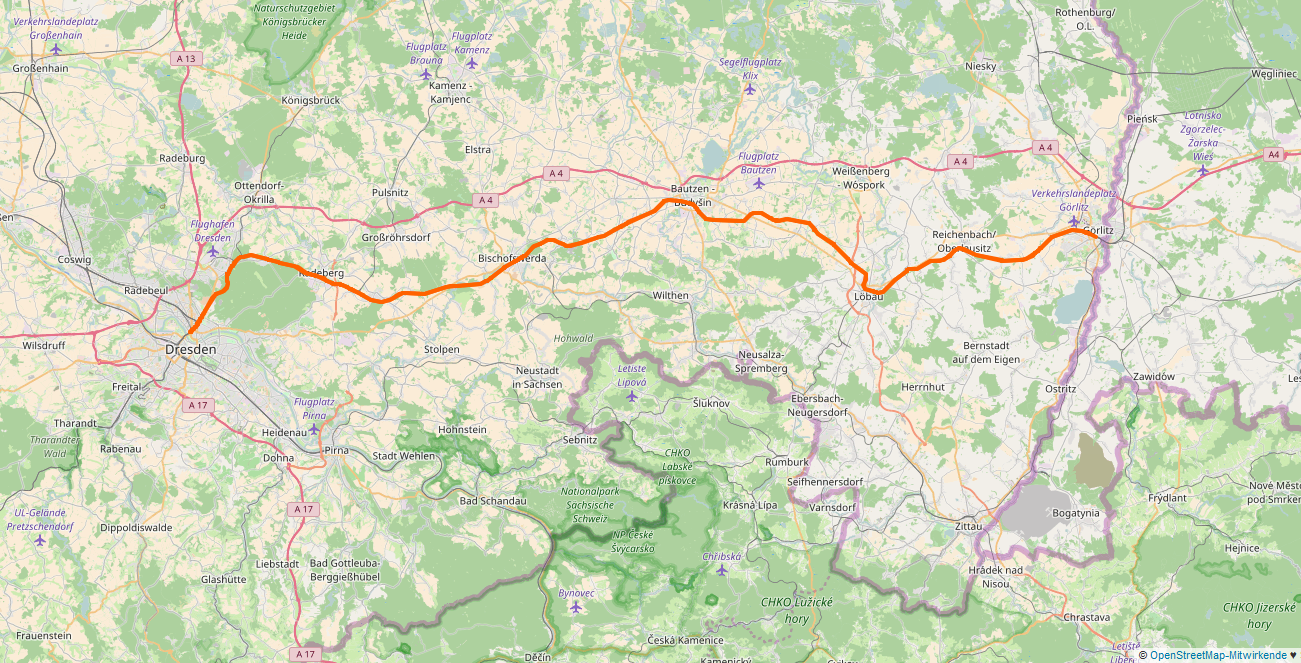

Overview
- Line number: 6212
- Locale: Saxony

Service
- Route number: 230

Technical
- Line length: 102.100 km (63.442 mi)
- Track gauge: 1,435 mm (4 ft 8 1/2 in) standard gauge
- Minimum radius: 429 m (1,407 ft)
- Electrification: DD-Klotzsche–DD-Neustadt: 15 kV/16.7 Hz AC overhead catenary
- Operating speed: 120 km/h (75 mph) (maximum)
- Maximum incline: 1.9%

The Görlitz–Dresden railway is a two-track main line railway in the German state of Saxony, originally built and operated by the Saxon-Silesian Railway Company. It runs through Upper Lusatia from Dresden via Bischofswerda, Bautzen and Löbau to Görlitz. The line is part of the route from Dresden to Wrocław and Pan-European Transport Corridor III. The first section of the line opened in 1845 and it is one of the oldest lines in Germany.

== History ==
=== Construction and opening ===
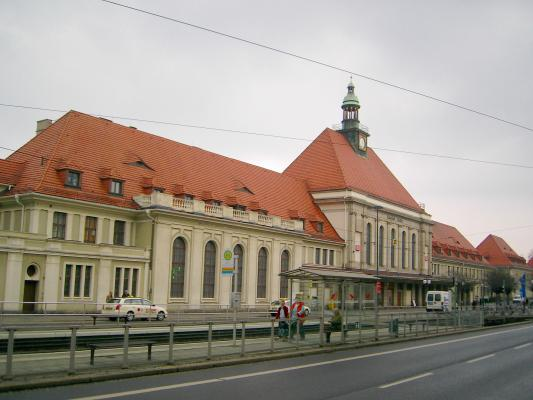
Görlitz station

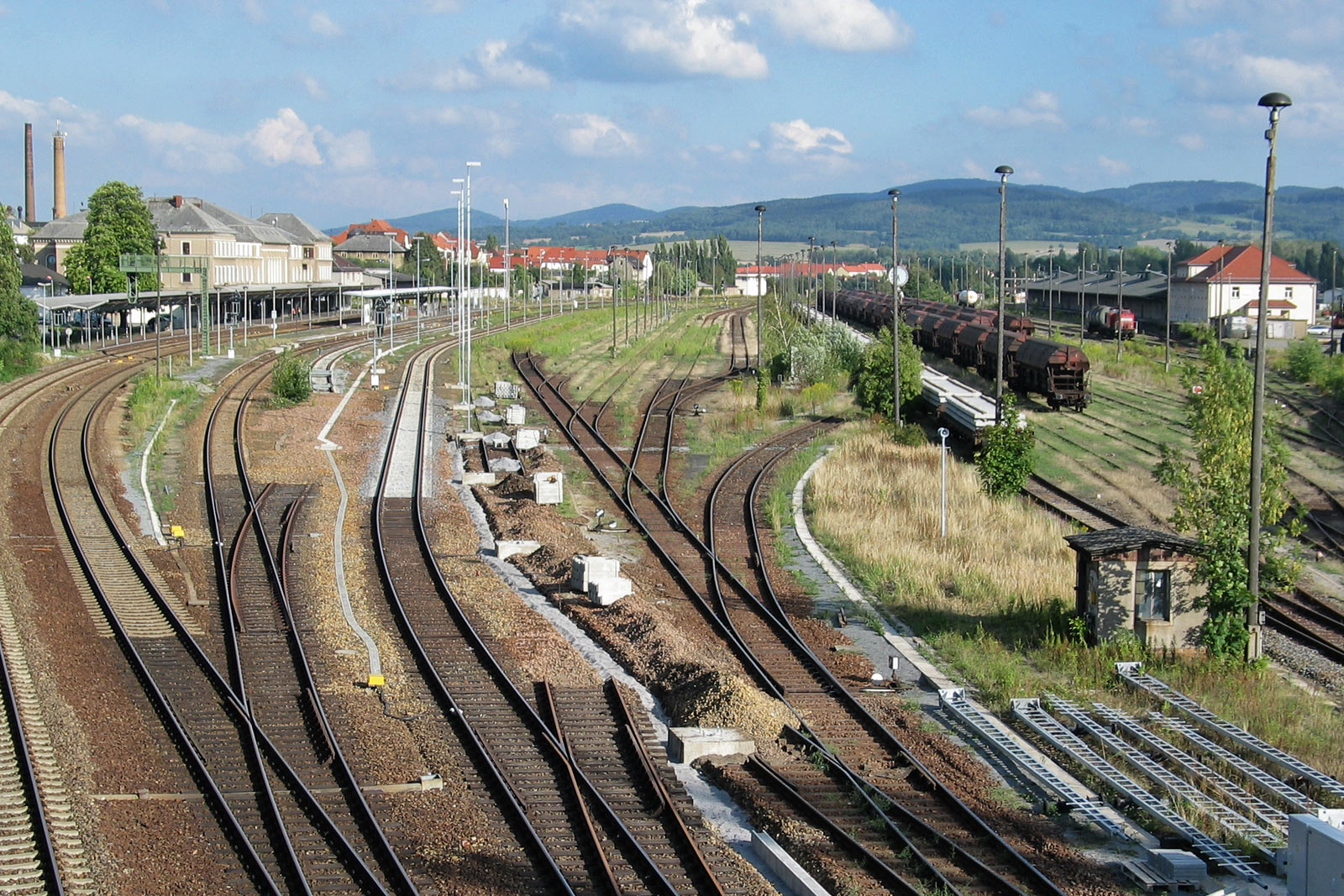
Bautzen station

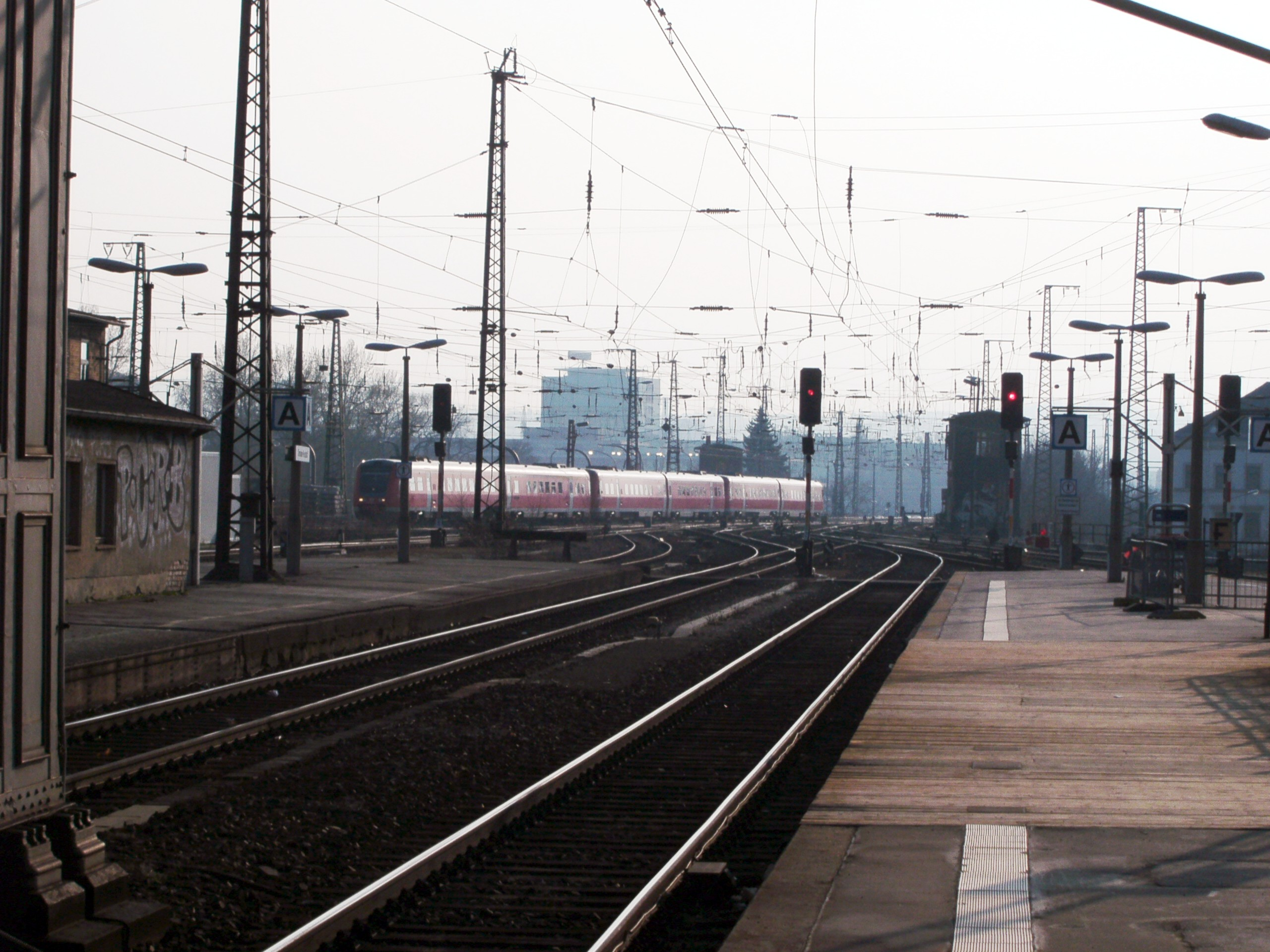
Dresden-Görlitz Regional-Express in Dresden-Neustadt station

A treaty between Prussia and Saxony signed on 24 July 1843 authorised the construction of a cross-border railway and its proposed connection to the Lower Silesian-Markish Railway company's line from Görlitz to Węgliniec (Kohlfurt), which was the first step in the building of a railway between Dresden and Görlitz. The treaty required the construction of the line to be finished within four years. The Saxon-Silesian Railway Company (German: Sächsisch-Schlesische Eisenbahngesellschaft) was established for the construction of the line, with capital of six million thalers. The Saxon government owned a third of the company. The Saxon government required the company to build a branch from Löbau to Zittau.

The construction began on 10 May 1844 and the first section from Dresden to Radeberg was opened to traffic on 17 November 1845. The line was extended to Bischofswerda on 21 December 1845, to Bautzen on 23 June 1846 and to Löbau on 23 December 1846. A test run from Bautzen on 16 December 1846 was stuck in heavy snow drifts in a cutting in Rabitz, just four kilometres (2 1/2 mi) beyond Bautzen. On the Prussian side, construction of earthworks began at Reichenbach in October 1845. Up to 800 men worked simultaneously on the section between Reichenbach and Gersdorf, but the snowy winter of 1846/47 brought work to take a stop. A test run between Löbau and Reichenbach was held on 29 April 1847 and the section was opened on 1 July of that year. The 102.2 km (63.5 mi) long line from Görlitz to Dresden was formally opening on 1 September 1847, along with the line from Görlitz to Węgliniec.

For nearly 20 years the railway line was controlled by the Saxon government. Following the Austro-Prussian War of 1866, in which Saxony had fought on the Austrian side, and the Peace of Prague, Saxony ceded ownership of the railway section located in Prussia to Prussia, but continued to operate the whole line on a contractual basis.

=== In the Second World War ===
With the outbreak of the Second World War on 1 September 1939, restrictions were soon imposed on the right of the public to travel on trains.

In April 1945 the line became heavily used for the passage of refugees, especially from Silesia, and the retreating Wehrmacht. All military trains had first priority on the line, often preventing the movement of trains carrying refugee and the wounded for days. On 16 April the Eastern Front reached the Neisse river and the spearhead of the Soviet 52nd Army reached the edge of Bautzen on 19 April. On 20 April the 52nd Soviet army began an attack on the defences of the Wehrmacht and the Volkssturm in the town centre. The German army held the Soviets off, but the Soviets broke through to the centre of the town on 24 April and heavy street fighting took place around Bautzen station. The last refugee train ran on the morning of 20 April from Bautzen towards Bischofswerda. As a result of the fighting on 24 April, the station building was completely destroyed. After the end of the war on 9 May 1945, almost all of the line was unusable, since all the bridges between Görlitz and Bautzen had been blown up or otherwise destroyed by the German Army on 7 May 1945, including the Neisse viaduct in Görlitz, the rail bridge in Löbau and the Spree viaduct in Bautzen. Furthermore, the line also lacked rolling stock, as many locomotives had been moved to the west.

=== Reconstruction after the Second World War ===
The reconstruction of the viaducts proved to be especially difficult, therefore travellers often had to change train. New stations were established, for example, Löbau Ost station opened at the eastern end of the Löbau viaduct on 6 August 1945 for a shuttle service from Görlitz. According to the timetable of November 1945, travellers from Görlitz had to take a two km (1 1/4 mi) walk from Löbau Ost to Löbau station. Numerous temporary bridges were built. The temporary bridge in Bautzen was completed in September 1945 and it was followed in October by the temporary Demitz viaduct. After the completion of temporary bridges at Blösa (6 November 1945) and Löbau (10 November), a continuous train service officially resumed between Görlitz and Dresden-Neustadt. Most of the temporary bridges were continuously monitored by so-called "bridge guards" of the transport police. Probably in anticipation of the subsequent dismantling of the second track, the temporary bridges were built for one track only.

In March 1946 work began on removing one track between Dresden and Görlitz to provide reparations to the Soviet Union. Stations left with crossing loops included Breitendorf, Pommritz, Kubschütz and Seitschen stations.

=== Normalisation in the 1970s and 1980s ===
In 1970, the second track was restored between Dresden-Klotzsche and Bautzen. This was followed in later years by the restoration of the Bautzen–Breitendorf, Reichenbach–Gersdorf and Markersdorf–Schlauroth marshalling yard sections. Between 1980 and 1984, the Gersdorf–Markersdorf and Löbau–Zoblitz sections regained their second track. One reason for the restoration of the track was increasing coal freight traffic. Single track remained until 1993 or 2000 only on the sections between Breitendorf and Löbau and between Schlauroth and Görlitz. In 1975 there were nine pairs of express trains, six of which ran to or from Poland. Travel time was a minimum of 92 minutes, only seven minutes less than in 1905.

=== After the political changes in East Germany in 1989 ===
After the political changes in Eastern Germany in 1989, reconstruction of the second track was accelerated. On 16 October 1994, the last remaining significant section of the line between Breitendorf and Löbau was restored to two tracks. Single track initially remained on short section of line between Schlauroth junction and Görlitz. During the reconstruction of the Görlitz node in 2000 this was reconstructed as double track. On 25 June 2000, two track operations commenced.

The former express service between Dresden and Görlitz was replaced in the late 1990s by InterRegio trains. Services stopping in Bautzen, Görlitz and Löbau ran every two hours. With the progressive abolition of InterRegio trains, this service was replaced by three pairs of trains, which reversed in Görlitz to continue to Wroclaw. On 11 December 2004, long-distance trains were discontinued altogether on this line. Since then, the Dresden–Görlitz line has only been served by regional trains.

In 2002 electrical contact wire was installed on the short section between Dresden-Neustadt and Dresden-Klotzsche for the S-Bahn service to Dresden Airport.

In 2003, a German–Polish agreement was signed on cooperation to improve rail links. As part of this agreement, it was agreed to upgrade the Polish border–Görlitz–Dresden section to allow speeds of 120–160 km/h, with long-term electrification. This is intended to reduce travel times for EuroCity and InterCity trains with traditional railway vehicles to about 3 hours 45 minutes between Dresden and Wroclaw. The implementation of these measures depends on funding. This work has not yet started.

== Operations ==
The Görlitz–Dresden line traffic is served by regional transport only. Trains on the line are managed by the Verkehrsverbund Oberelbe (Upper Elbe Transport Authority) and the Verkehrsverbund Oberlausitz-Niederschlesien (Upper Lusatia–Lower Silesia Transport Authority). A few services are provided under a contract awarded in December 2008 to Ostdeutsche Eisenbahn and operated as line OE60V. From March 2009 to December 2014, three pairs of regional trains each day were operated between Dresden and Wrocław Główny by DB Regio. Since then services have been provided by Vogtlandbahn and Lower Silesian Railways, but were interrupted for a few months in 2015.

The following table shows regional services that use all or part of the Görlitz–Dresden line (May 2017):

Line	Route	Frequency in minutes	Remarks
RE1	Dresden – Bischofswerda – Görlitz	120	3x daily to Wrocław
RE2	Dresden – Bischofswerda (– Zittau – Liberec)	120	
RB33	Dresden – Dresden-Klotzsche (– Königsbrück)	60 (Sa/Su: 120)	
RB34	Dresden – Radeberg (– Kamenz)	60 (Su: 120)	
RB60	Dresden – Bischofswerda – Görlitz	120	
OE60V	Bischofswerda – Görlitz	120	Mo-Sa only
RB61	Dresden – Bischofswerda (– Zittau)	120	
S2	(Pirna –) Dresden-Neustadt – Dresden-Klotzsche (– Dresden Airport)	30	

== Sources ==
=== References ===
- Preuß, Erich; Preuß, Rainer (1991). Sächsische Staatseisenbahnen (in German). Berlin: transpress Verlagsgesellschaft mbH.
- von Polenz, Hans (2006). Eisenbahnen im Bautzener Land (in German). Lausitzer Druck- u. Verlagshaus. ISBN 3-00-018243-8.
- Rettig, Wilfried (1994). Eisenbahnknoten Görlitz (in German). Bufe Fachbuch-Verlag. ISBN 3-922138-53-5.
