= Dresden Flughafen station =

Railway station in Dresden, Germany

Dresden ✈ Flughafen
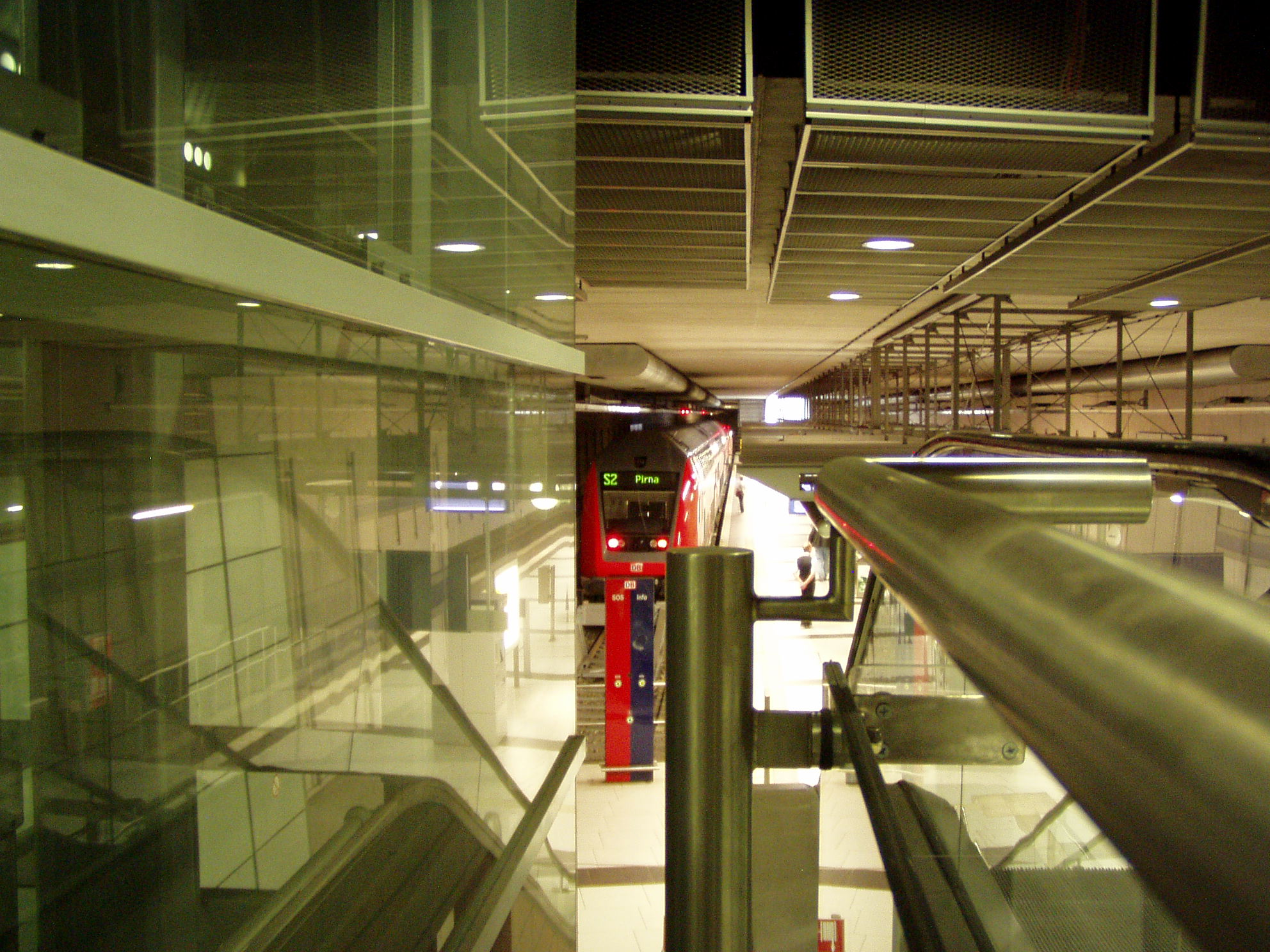
- Dresden Airport station

General information
- Location: Dresden, Saxony, Germany
- Coordinates: 51°07′29″N 13°45′58″E
- Line: Dresden-Klitzsche–Dresden Airport
- Platforms: 2
- Tracks: 2

Construction
- Accessible: Yes

Other information
- Station code: 8016
- DS100 code: DKTF
- IBNR: 8011399
- Category: 5
- Website: www.bahnhof.de

History
- Opened: 25 March 2001

Services
| Preceding station | Dresden S-Bahn | Following station |
|---|---|---|
| Terminus | S 2 | Dresden Grenzstraße towards Pirna |
Location

Dresden Flughafen (German: Bahnhof Dresden Flughafen) is an underground railway station at the airport serving the city of Dresden in Saxony, Germany. The station, along with the 1.15 km long extension of the Klotzsche–Grenzstraße railway to Dresden Airport opened on 25 March 2001. The station was the first and, until the opening of the Leipzig City Tunnel, the only underground station in Saxony. It is also the first station in Saxony and the eighth in Germany at an airport.

== Description ==
Due to the increase in passenger numbers after the reunification of Germany, a project for the construction of an airport terminal was established. This would include an underground station.

€220 million was invested in the airport terminal, including the station. The state of Saxony financed the rail connection of the airport to the tune of almost €50 million.

Construction of the rail connection to the airport began on 30 July 1998. The precast concrete tunnel was completed in the summer of 1999. This connected to a 140-metre-long terminal platform, which is 55 cm high and has tracks on either side. The station was opened with completion of the connecting line on 25 March 2001. The station is located in the basement of the terminal (level K) and is connected with it via steps, escalators and lifts. There is also a set of emergency exit stairs in the northern part of the platform.

After its completion, the station initially had no overhead wires. Diesel railcars were used and exhaust gas extractors operated on the platform. A fire barrier between the station and the airport terminal can be closed in case of emergency.

In December 2004, the tracks at the station were equipped with overhead conductor rails for electric trains. Since then, train sets hauled by electric locomotives have served the airport instead of DMUs.

Under the Dresden land-use plan that has been in force since the end of 1996, routes for both a connecting curve to the north of Dresden-Klotzsche station and an extension of the line towards Dresden Industriegelände railway station to the southwest of the airport are reserved. If these plans are implemented, it would be possible, for example, for trains to continue to east Saxony without reversing at the airport. However, there are no concrete plans to implement these ideas.

== See also ==
- Rail transport in Germany
