= Königsbrück station =

Railway station in Königsbrück, Germany

Königsbrück
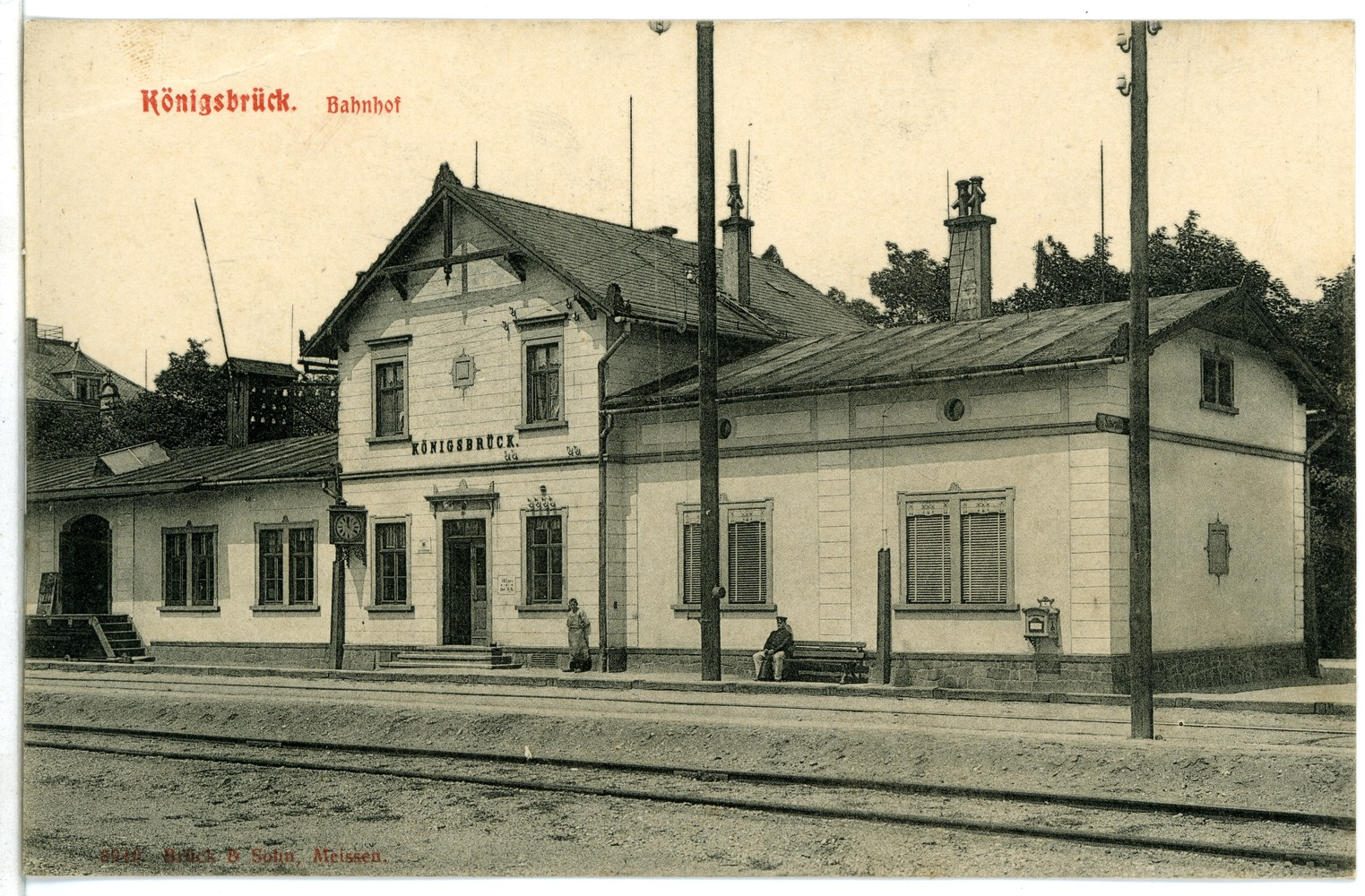
- Königsbrück station in 1907

General information
- Location: Königsbrück, Saxony, Germany
- Coordinates: 51°15′36″N 13°53′59″E
- Line: Dresden–Königsbrück
- Platforms: 2

Services
Preceding station	DB Regio Südost	Following station
Laußnitz towards Dresden-Neustadt	RB 33	Terminus
Location

Königsbrück (German: Bahnhof Königsbrück) is a railway station in the town of Königsbrück, Saxony, Germany. The station lies on the Dresden-Klotzsche–Königsbrück railway and the train services are operated by DB Regio Südost. The line continuing to Bernsdorf closed on 5 November 2000. Königsbrück was also served by Königsbrück Ost railway station, which was on the closed line to Bernsdorf.

== Train services ==
The station is served by the following services:

- regional service RB 33 Dresden − Königsbrück
