= Pirna station =

Railway station in Germany

Pirna
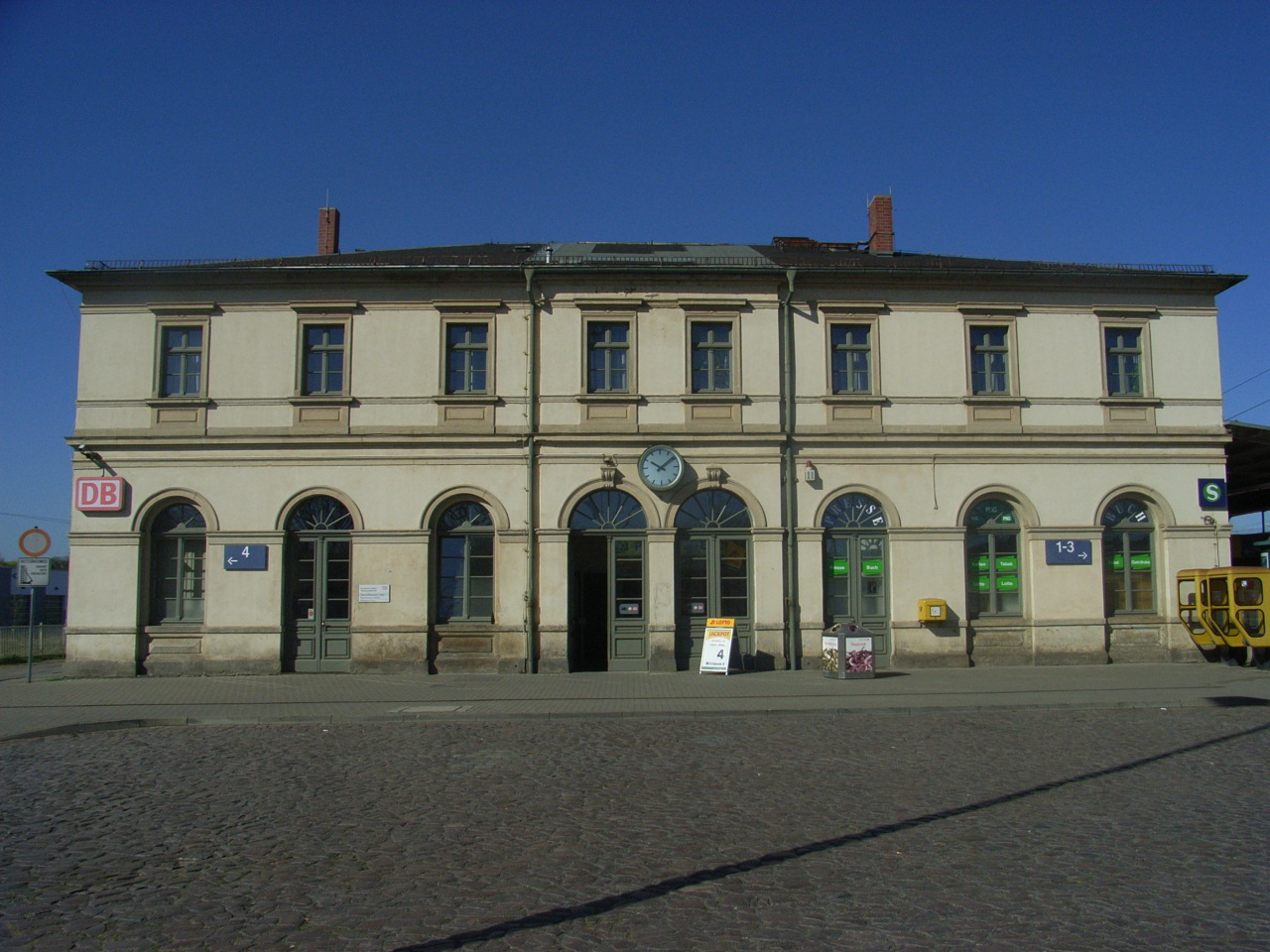

General information
- Location: B 10, Pirna, Saxony; Germany
- Coordinates: 50°57′44″N 13°55′43″E
- Lines: Děčín–Dresden-Neustadt (km 45.44); Pirna–Coswig (S-Bahn; km 0.00); Kamenz–Pirna (km 46.29); Former Pirna–Gottleuba (km 0.00); Former Pirna–Großcotta (km 0.00)
- Platforms: 4

Construction
- Accessible: Yes

Other information
- Station code: 4943
- DS100 code: DPI
- IBNR: 8010272
- Category: 4
- Website: www.bahnhof.de

History
- Opened: 15 October 1875

Services
Preceding station	DB Regio Südost	Following station
Heidenau towards Dresden Hbf	RE 20	Bad Schandau towards Litoměřice město
Terminus	RB 71	Pirna-Copitz towards Sebnitz
Preceding station	Dresden S-Bahn	Following station
Heidenau-Großsedlitz towards Meißen Triebischtal	S 1	Obervogelgesang towards Schöna
Heidenau-Großsedlitz towards Dresden Flughafen	S 2	Terminus
Location

Pirna station is the largest railway station in the town of Pirna in the German state of Saxony. The station is integrated into the network of the Dresden S-Bahn. It is also the starting point of a Regionalbahn service and a Regional-Express stop.

== Passenger operations ==
=== Old station ===
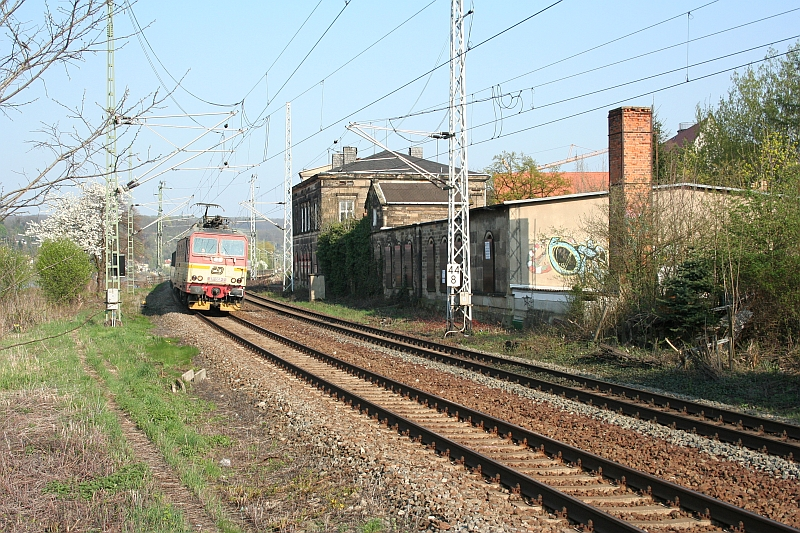
Old Pirna station with passing EuroCity service

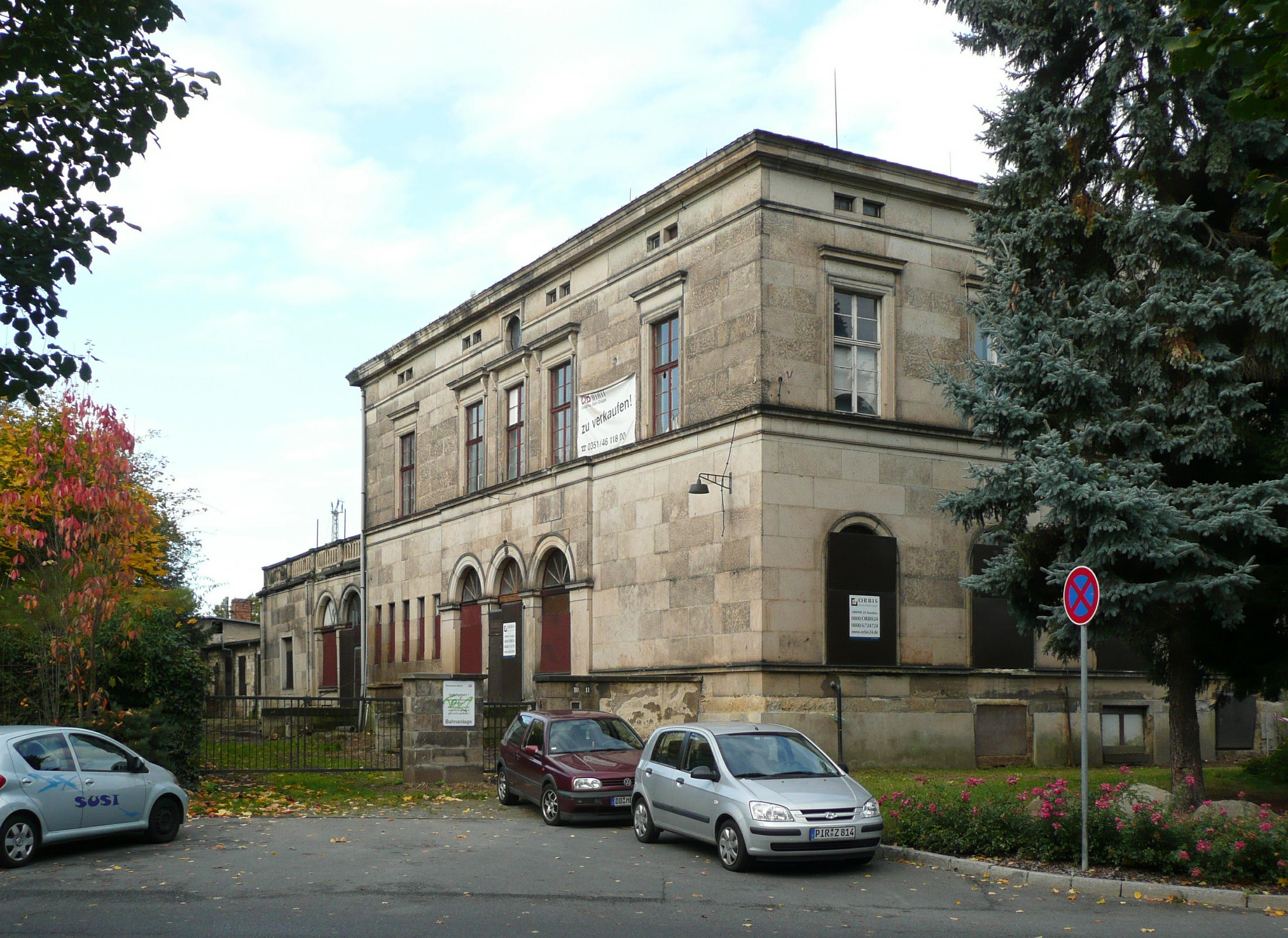
View of the old station from the street

The first Pirna station was opened on 1 August 1848 together with the first section of Děčín–Dresden-Neustadt railway (Elbe Valley Railway). The station was close to Pirna's Altstadt (old town) not far from the monastery church of St. Henry (Heinrich). The station building was built in the Neoclassical architectural style with Romanesque elements. It originally had two main sections, connected by a hallway, and a covered main platform.

Only a few years after its opening the station reached capacity because of increasing traffic. Due to its suburban location no room was available for expansion. It was difficult for trains to cross and for locomotives to be re-supplied with water at the site. The upgrading of railway facilities at this location was difficult.

The first bridge of the Elbe in Pirna (now called the Stadtbrücke—"town bridge") was built in 1875 to the west of the former station as part of the Kamenz–Pirna railway. A new Pirna station was opened on 15 October 1875 at the intersection of the Kamenz–Pirna railway and the Elbe Valley Railway. The old station was closed on 18 October 1875. During the bombing of the Pirna Elb Bridge in 1945, the old station building was partially destroyed. The track maintenance branch was housed in the building until 1998. During this period, the building was also used for residential purposes. At present, the listed building stands empty. The old Pirna station is the oldest preserved station building of the Saxon-Bohemian Railway (Sächsisch-Böhmischen Eisenbahn).

=== New station ===
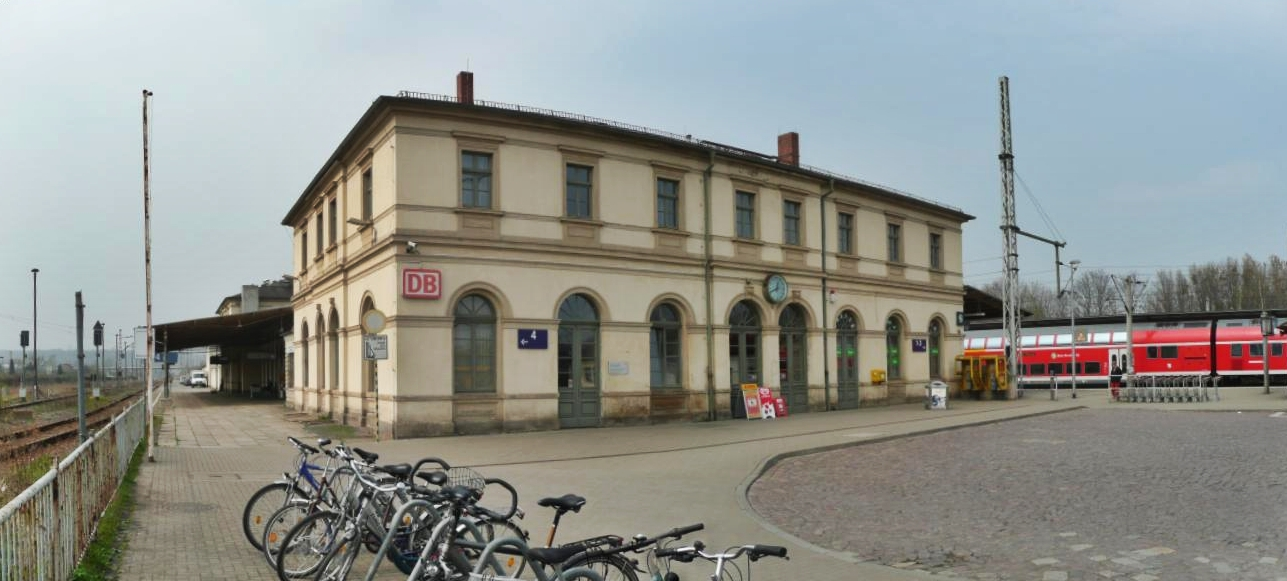
View of the station building, on the north side (right) are platforms 1–3, from which the trains of the Dresden S-Bahn operate. From the south side (platform 4, left), the trains run via Dürrröhrsdorf to Neustadt. The lines to Großcotta and Bad Gottleuba formerly began here.

The new station was opened on 15 October 1875 in the district of Westvorstadt. The architecture of the building was inspired by the old station. It consists of two main buildings connected by an intermediate structure. The eastern building faces the station forecourt and forms the actual station building. This is on an island between rail tracks. The tracks of the Elbe Valley Railway run to the north of the building (platform 3, next to the station building, and tracks 1 and 2 on an island platform) and the Pirna–Großcotta railway runs south of the building through platform 4, formerly the starting point for trains to Kamenz, Bad Gottleuba and Großcotta . South of platform 4 there was platform 5, which is now disused, which could only be reached by crossing the track from platform 4 at ground level.

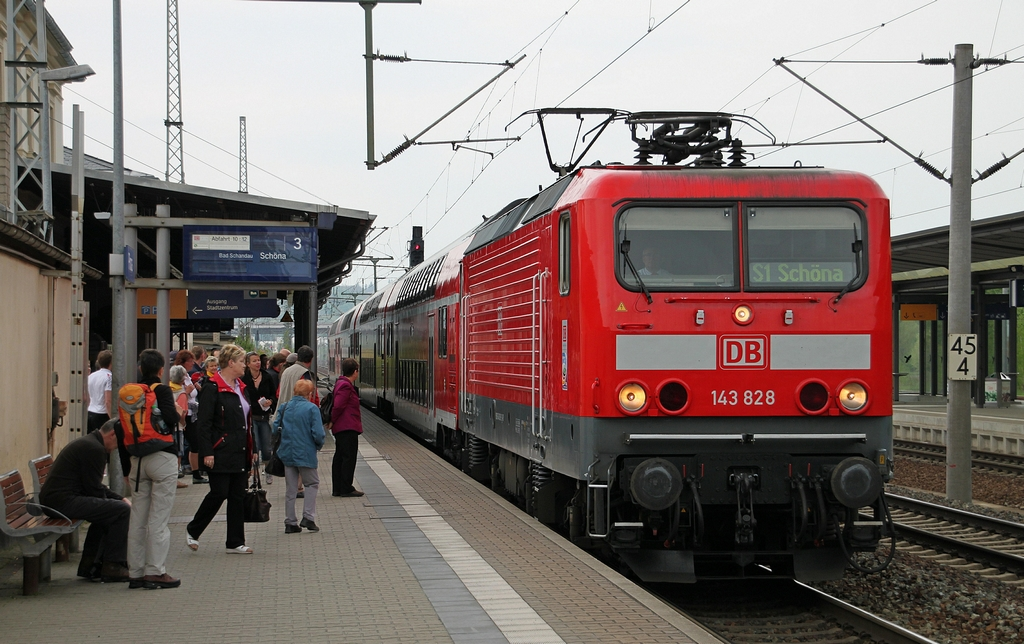
S-Bahn service on line S1 (Meissen–Schöna) at platform 3

Between October 1996 and July 2001, the northern platforms (main platform and island platform) on the Dresden–Děčín railway were rebuilt with a length of 172 metres (island platforms 1 and 2) and 146 metres (main platform 3). At the same time, the Pirna–Coswig S-Bahn line received a separate pair of tracks, which begins in Pirna and currently (2015) ends at Dresden-Neustadt.

As part of the federal government's stimulus package, the station building was redeveloped in 2009 and 2010 by DB Station&Service for around €1.5 million. The focus of activities was on saving energy through the renovation of the facade and the roof, which received insulating plaster over its whole surface. The old wooden windows and sandstone structure elements have been repaired to preserve their historic aspects. The undisputed highlight was the opening of the ceiling in the reception hall and the renovation of the skylight lying over it to restore the historical impression of a friendly, light-filled space.

== Freight ==
South of the station building there was a freight clearance yard. Additionally there were extensive track systems for the formation of trains and sidings that connected directly with the station area.

The tracks used for freight traffic were greatly scaled back between 1996 and 2005. After that the yard was only used for the marshalling of freight trains.

Many tracks have been re-created or reconstructed since 2013. For freight transport, the main track to the former Pirna thermal power station was renewed and several works sidings were built. These tracks form part of the AGRO-Terminal, a branch of a Hamburg grain and feed service. It has used the tracks since 1 October 2012 for the receipt and dispatch of trains.

== Locomotive depot ==
Not far from the station there was the Pirna locomotive depot (Bahnbetriebswerk). In 1963 the Bad Schandau locomotive depot was attached to the Pirna depot as an entry point to it and on 1 January 1968, Pirna depot took over operations from the Dresden locomotive depot. In the following two years, diesel locomotives of class V 100 were allocated to the depot. Beginning in 1969, light diesel multiple units were based in the Pirna depot and changes of traction were carried out in the operations yard for a few years. Locomotives running on the Pirna branch lines and the Müglitz Valley Railway were based at the Pirna depot or later in the operations yard.

The 15-stall roundhouse was hit by several bombs in the Second World War and it was then rebuilt with temporary repairs. In particular, the roof remained temporary. Therefore, the engine shed had to be closed due to disrepair in October 1995. In the following years, the roof partially collapsed. In early April 2009, the roundhouse was demolished. In June 2012, ITL Eisenbahngesellschaft began construction of a new railway depot for the maintenance of locomotives and wagons on the site. On 27 June 2013, ITL opened its new depot with four indoor tracks at a cost of around €6 million.

== Partial conversion of the railway station premises ==
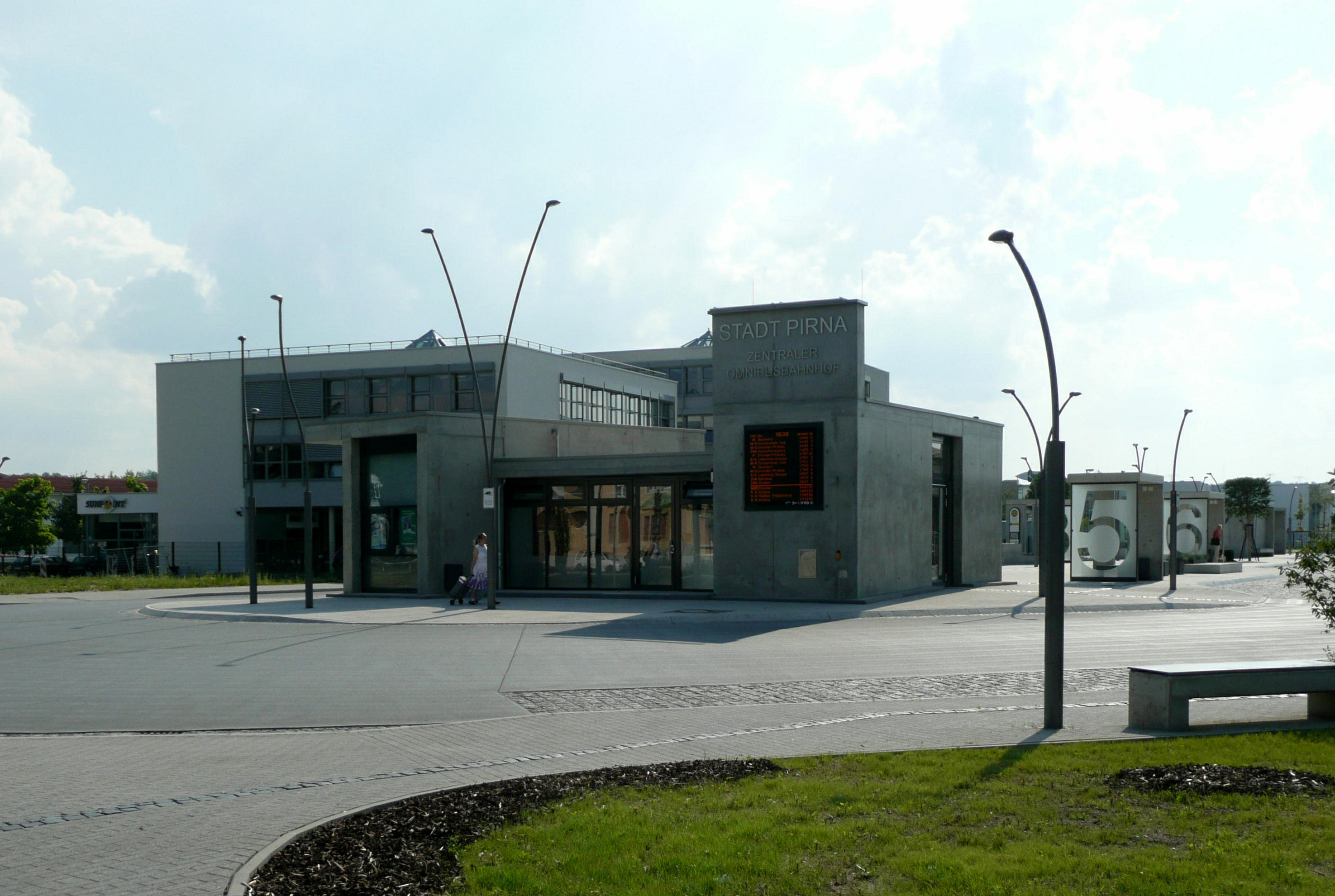
State Reservoir Administration of Saxony (left rear) and Pirna bus station

Following the end of freight operations, large parts of Pirna station were unused. Therefore, the new depot of the Pirna-Sebnitz Upper Elbe Transport Company (Oberelbische Verkehrsgesellschaft Pirna-Sebnitz, opened in 2001) and the administrative building of the State Reservoir Administration of Saxony (Landestalsperrenverwaltung Sachsen) were built in this area. This was followed in January 2008 by the opening of Pirna's new central bus station, which was built on the site of the former freight depot and the old bus station.

== Passenger services ==
Pirna station is served by four rail services, which are operated by DB Regio Südost (as of 15 December 2024):

Line	Route	Frequency (min)	Operator
S 1	Meißen-Triebischtal – Coswig (b Dresden) – Dresden-Neustadt − Dresden Mitte − Dresden Hbf – Heidenau – Pirna – Bad Schandau (– Schöna)	30	DB Regio Südost
S 2	Dresden Flughafen − Dresden-Klotzsche − Dresden-Neustadt − Dresden Mitte − Dresden Hbf − Heidenau − Pirna	30 (Mon–Sat only)	DB Regio Südost
RB 71	Pirna – Dürrröhrsdorf – Neustadt (Sachs) – Sebnitz (Sachs)	60; 120 (Sat–Sun)	DB Regio Südost
RE 20	Dresden Hbf – Pirna – Bad Schandau – Děčín hl. n. – Ústí nad Labem západ (– Litoměřice město)	Some services (seasonal on weekends)	DB Regio Südost

== Photographs ==
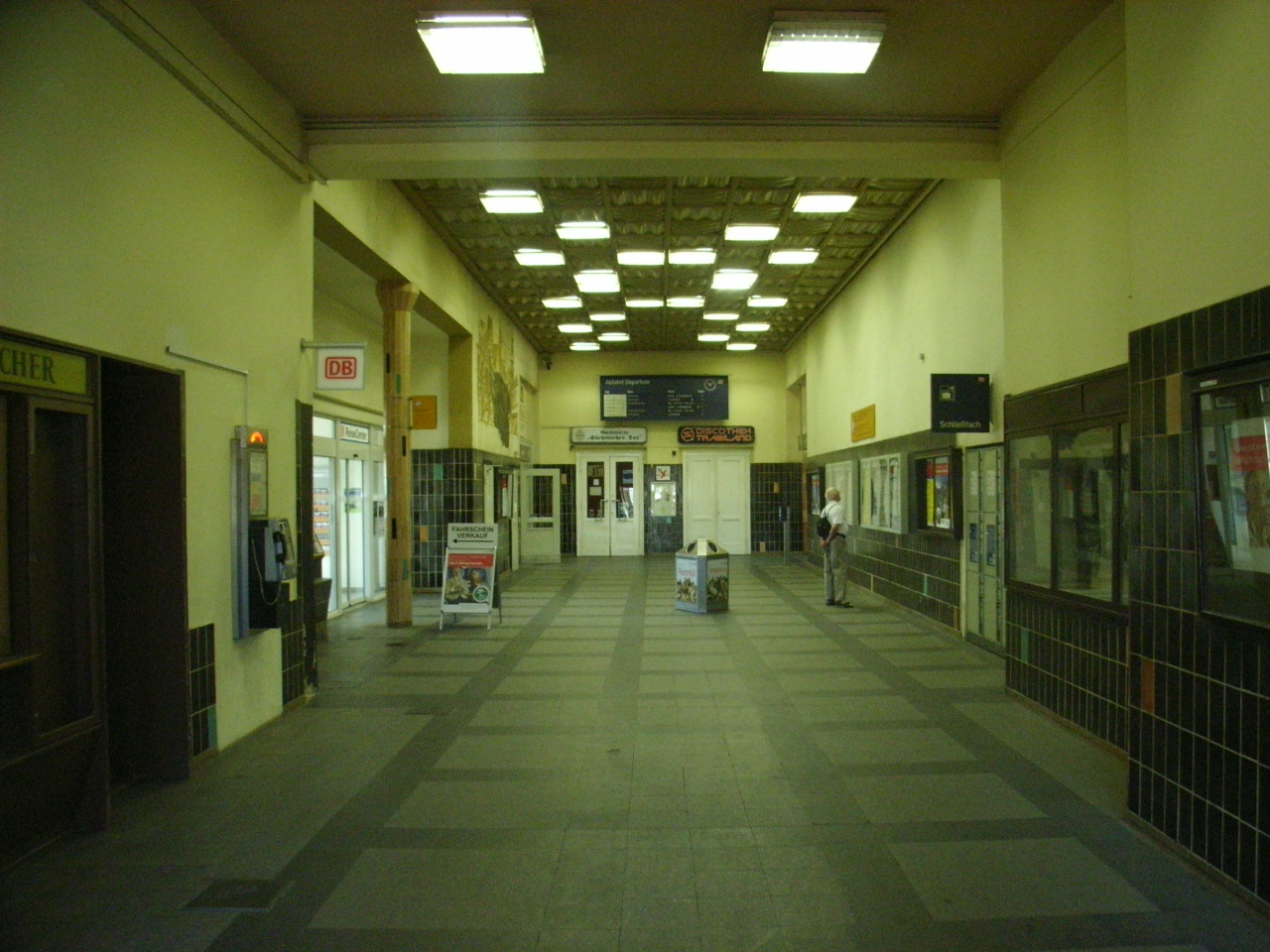
View of the hall of the station building before restoration (March 2007)

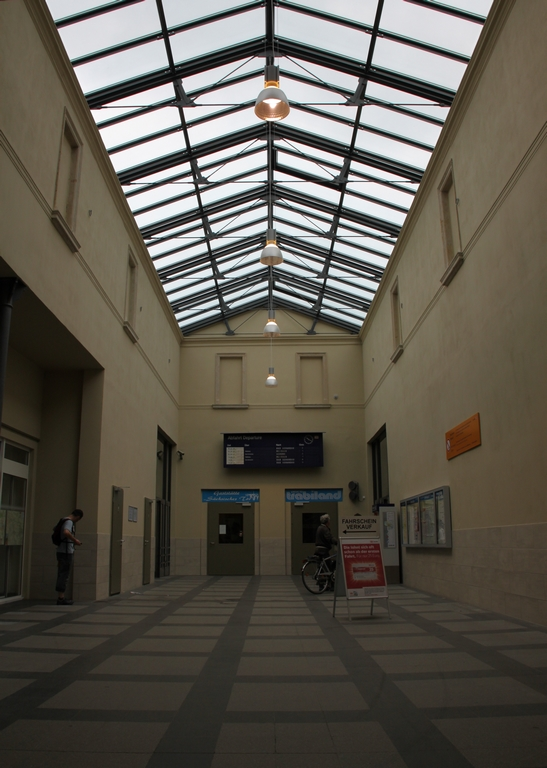
View of the hall with naturally-litten atrium after renovation (April 2011)

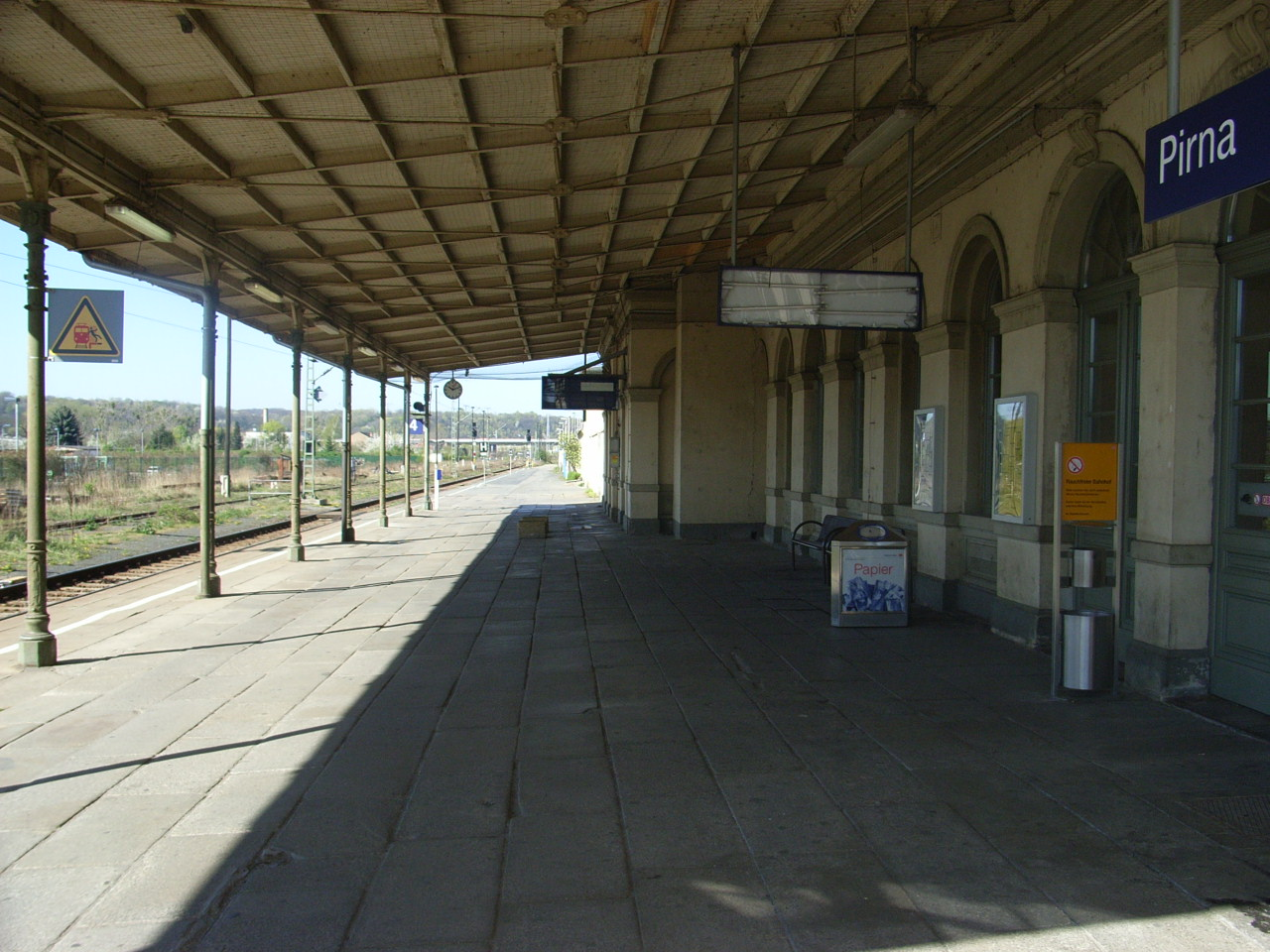
Platform 4 on the Kamenz – Pirna railway

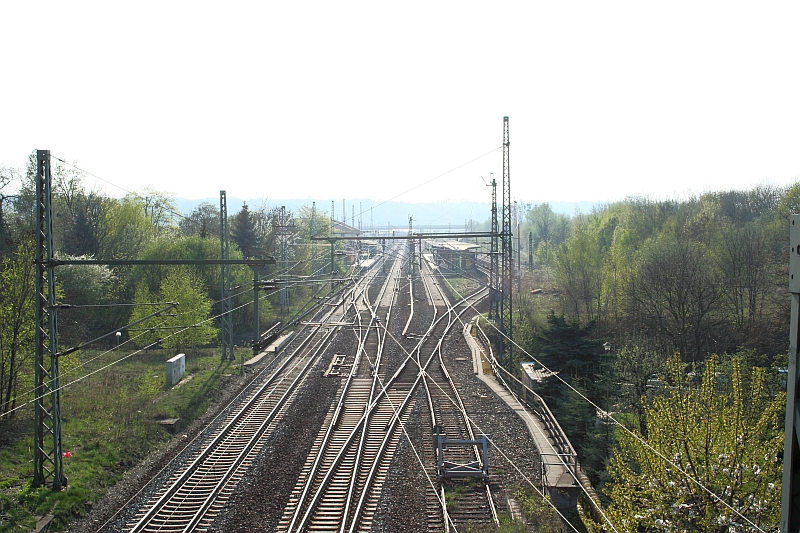
View over the Pirna town bridge on the tracks of the Dresden–Děčín railway to the station

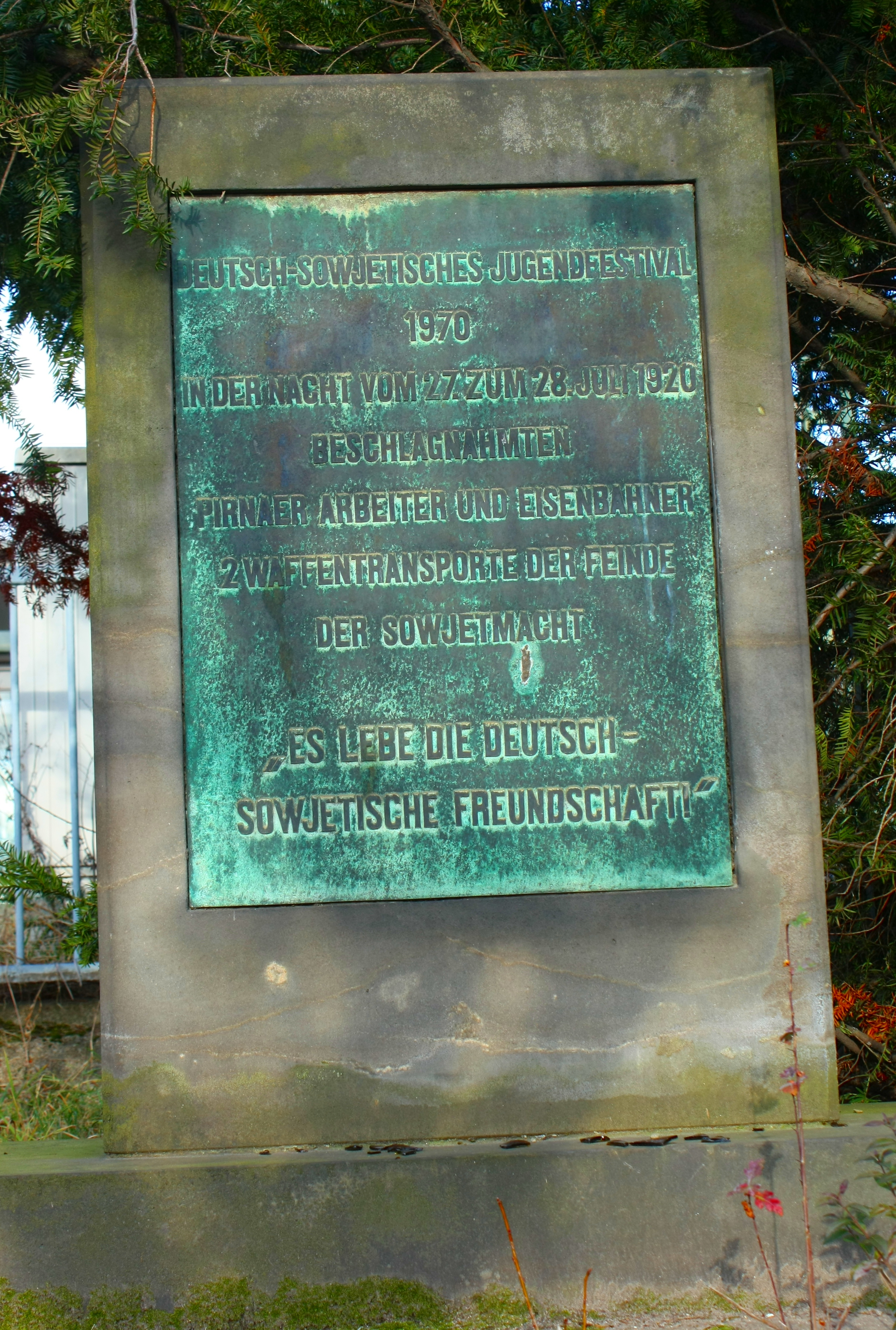
Memorial stone at the station for the German-Soviet Youth Festival 1970
