= Bad Schandau station =

Railway station in Bad Schandau, Germany

Bad Schandau
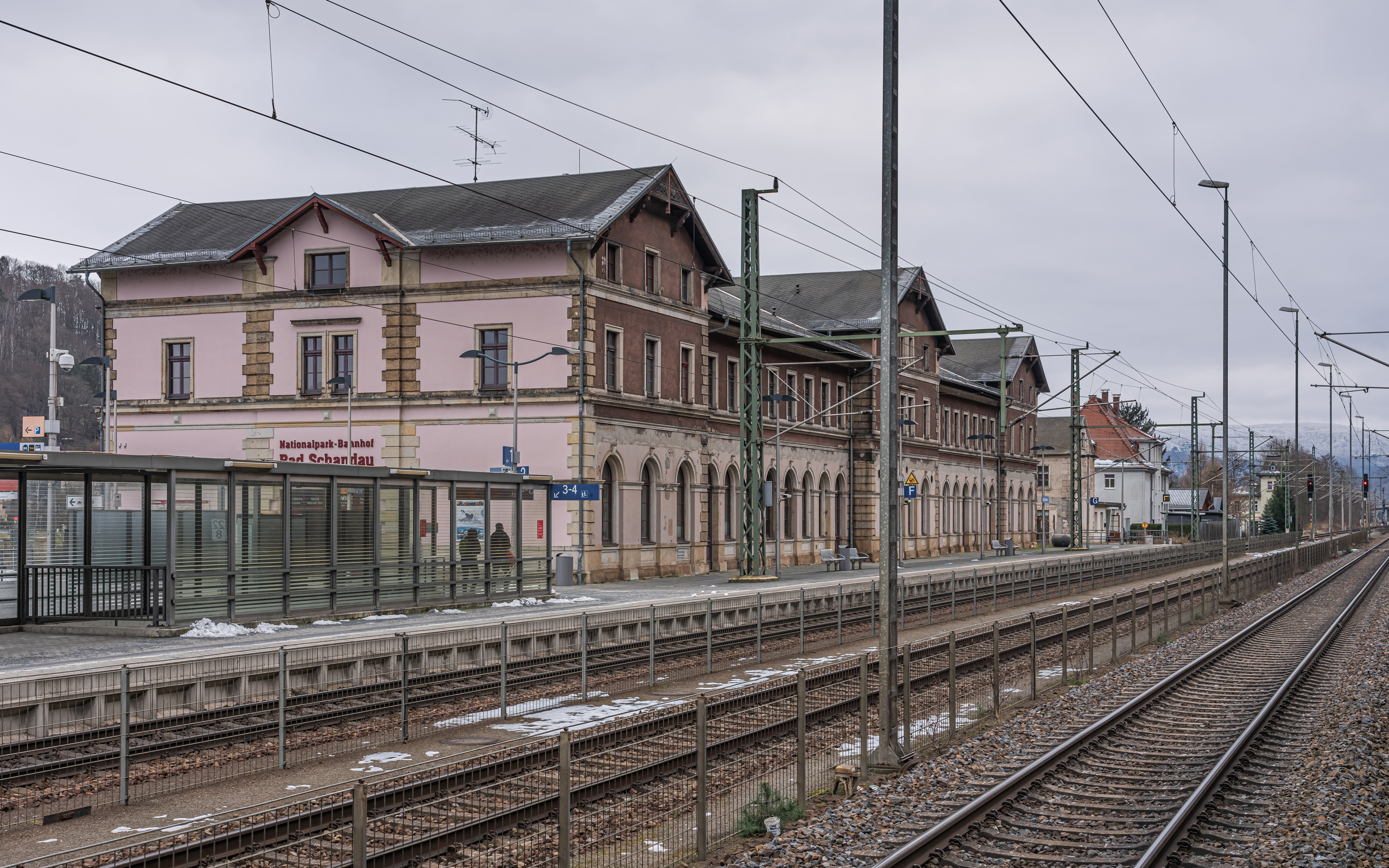
- Bad Schandau railway station

General information
- Location: Am Bahnhof 5, 01814 Bad Schandau, Saxony; Germany
- Coordinates: 50°55′06″N 14°08′21″E
- Lines: Děčín hl.n.–Dresden-Neustadt (km 22.760); Bautzen–Bad Schandau (km 64.183)
- Platforms: 4

Construction
- Accessible: Yes

Other information
- Station code: 335
- DS100 code: DSA
- IBNR: 8010022
- Category: 3
- Website: www.bahnhof.de

History
- Opened: 1 July 1877

Services
Preceding station	DB Fernverkehr	Following station
Dresden Hbf towards Hamburg-Altona	RJ 27 every 2 hours	Děčín hl.n. towards Praha hl.n., Budapest Nyugati or Wien Hbf
Dresden Hbf towards København H	RJ 27	Děčín hl.n. towards Praha hl.n.
Dresden Hbf towards Kiel Hbf	RJ 27	Děčín hl.n. towards Praha hl.n.
Preceding station	European Sleeper	Following station
Dresden Hbf towards Brussels-South	Brussels - Prague	Děčín hl.n. towards Prague
Preceding station	DB Regio Südost	Following station
Pirna towards Dresden Hbf	RE 20	Schöna towards Litoměřice město
Rathmannsdorf towards Rumburk	U 28	Krippen towards Děčín main
Preceding station	Dresden S-Bahn	Following station
Königstein (Sachs) towards Meißen Triebischtal	S 1	Krippen towards Schöna
Location

Bad Schandau station is a minor junction station in Bad Schandau in the German state of Saxony. The station is located on the south bank on the Elbe on the Děčín–Dresden-Neustadt railway and it is also the terminus of the Bautzen–Bad Schandau railway. The town is located on the north side of the river and is connected to the station by a ferry and a road bridge.

Bad Schandau is a frontier station for international traffic between Germany and the Czech Republic. Bad Schandau station is now the only long-distance stop in the touristic area and national park of Saxon Switzerland. It is marketed as a "national park station" by Deutsche Bahn and the municipality of Bad Schandau.

About 1,600 passengers and visitors pass through and 94 trains stop at the station each day.

== History ==
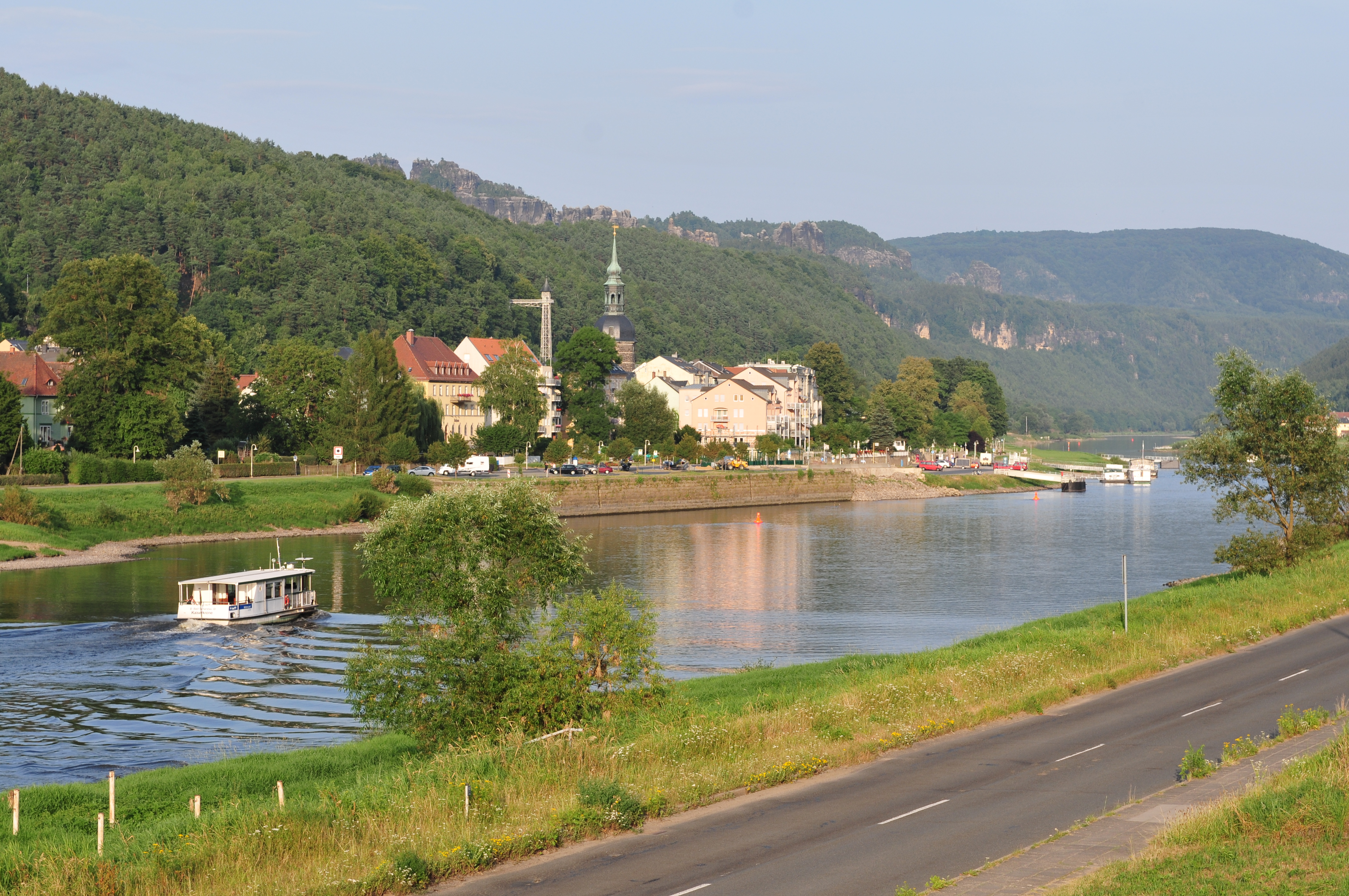
View from the station to the town

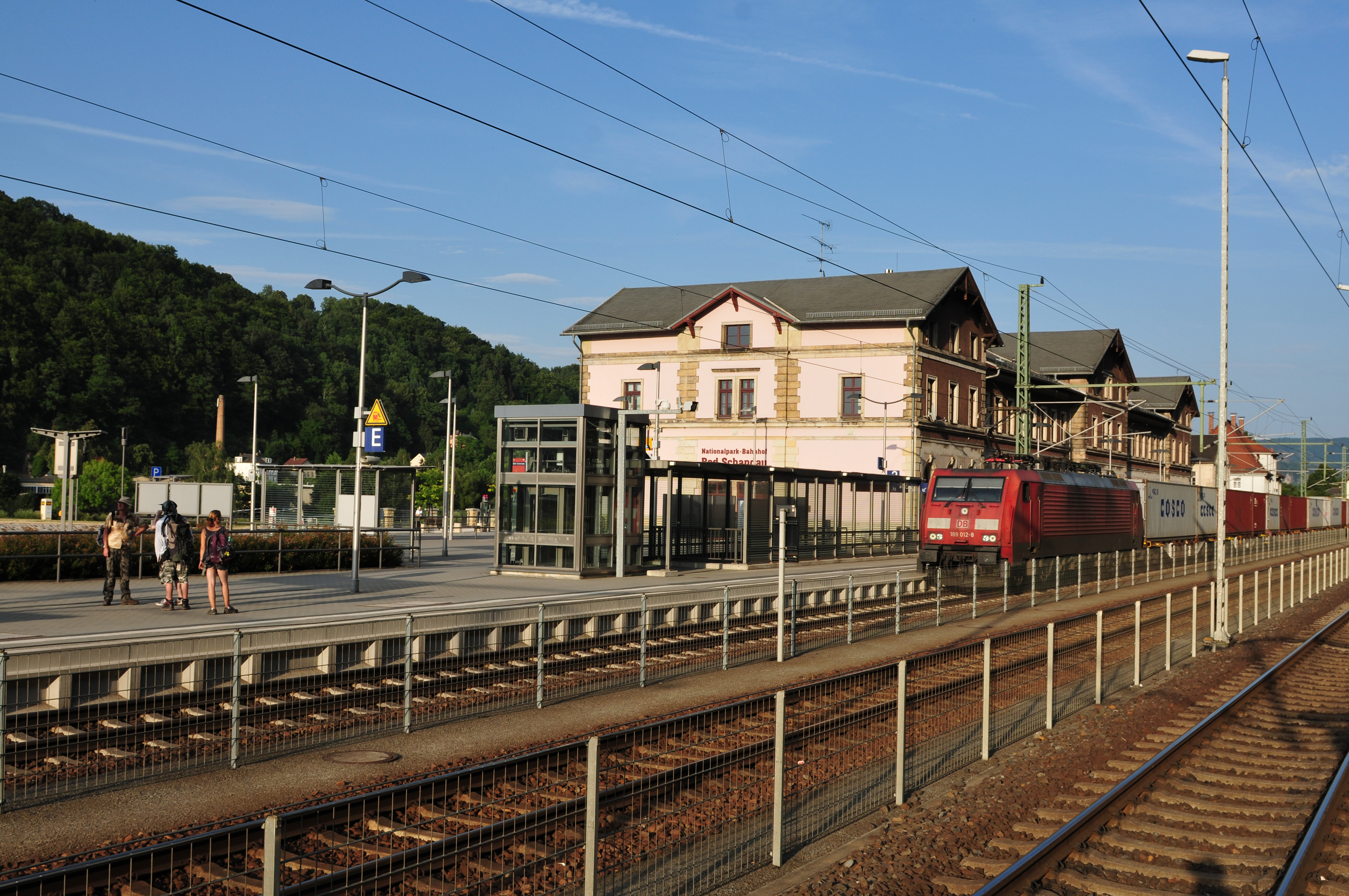
Passage of a freight train

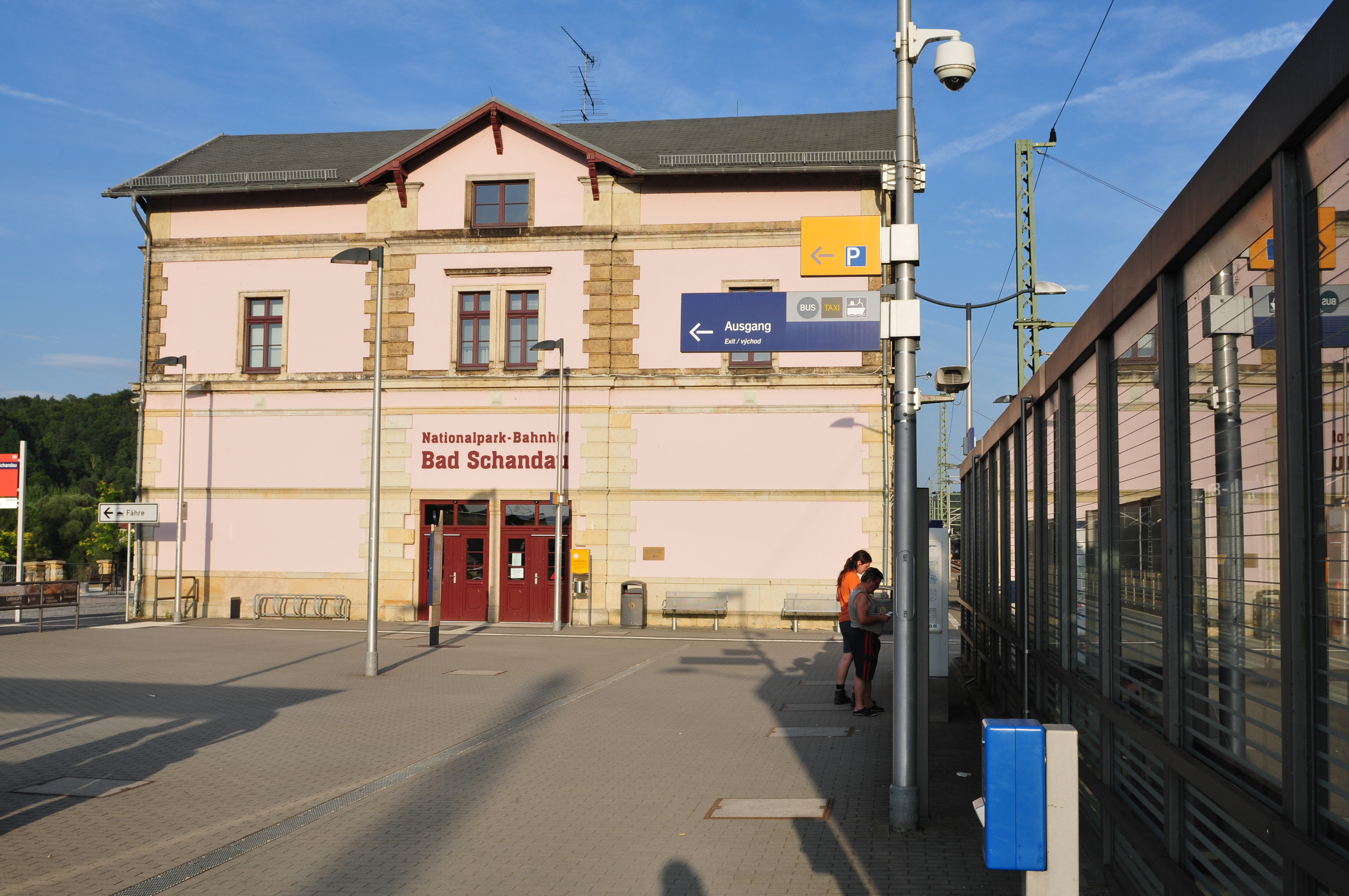
Signage as "Nationalparkbahnhof"

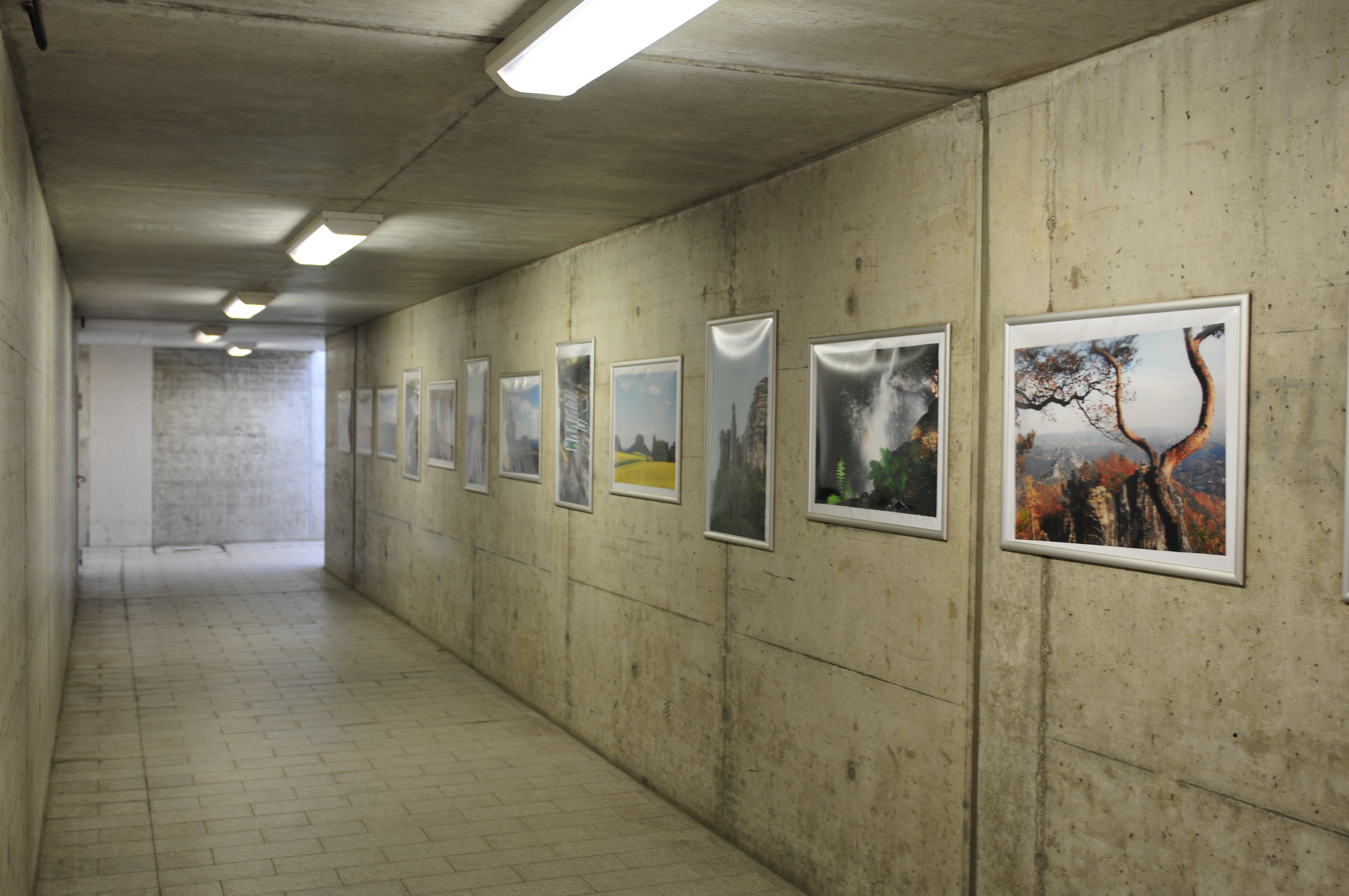
Pedestrian subway

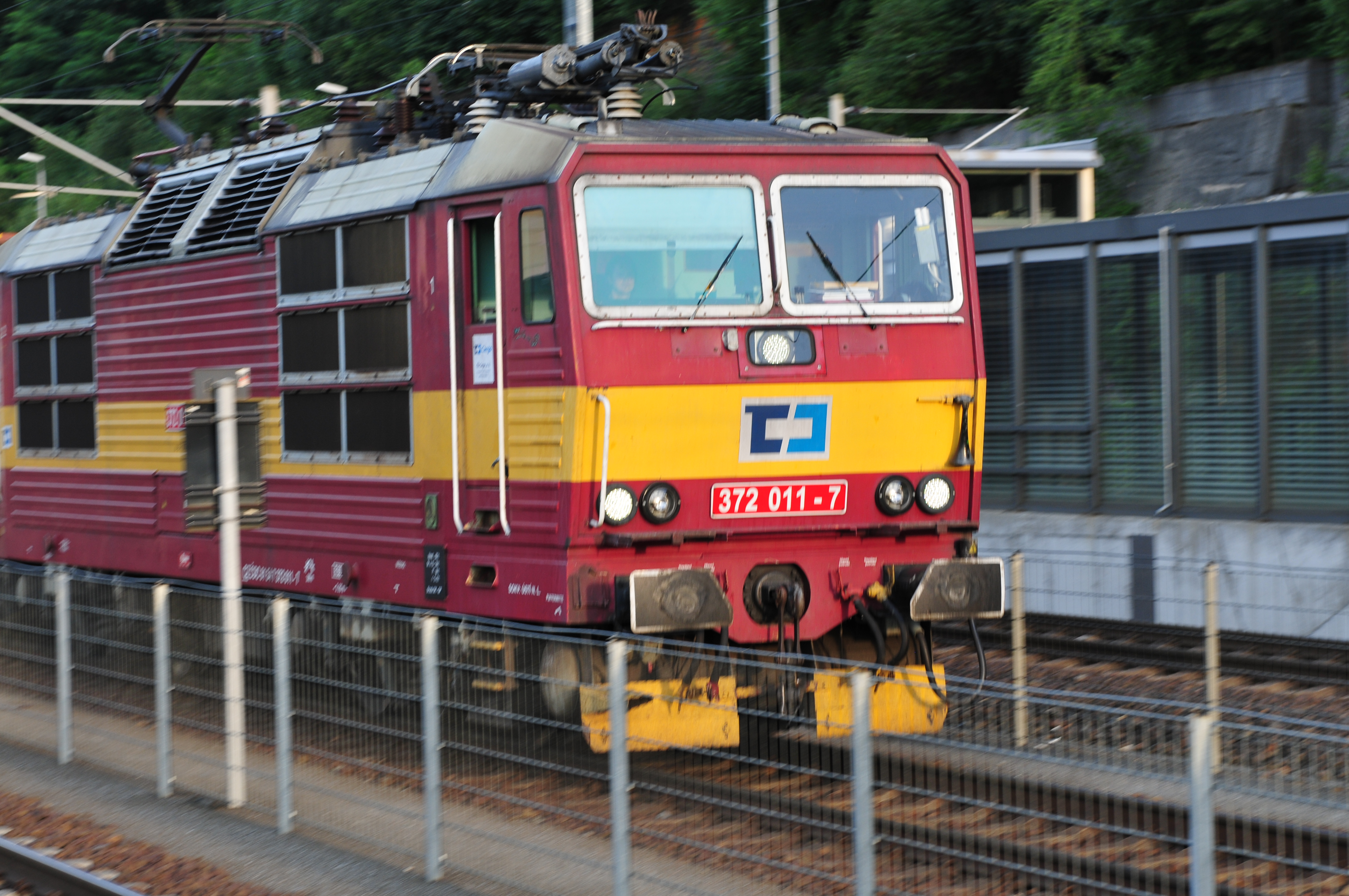
A Czech class 372 locomotive passes through the station in front of a freight train

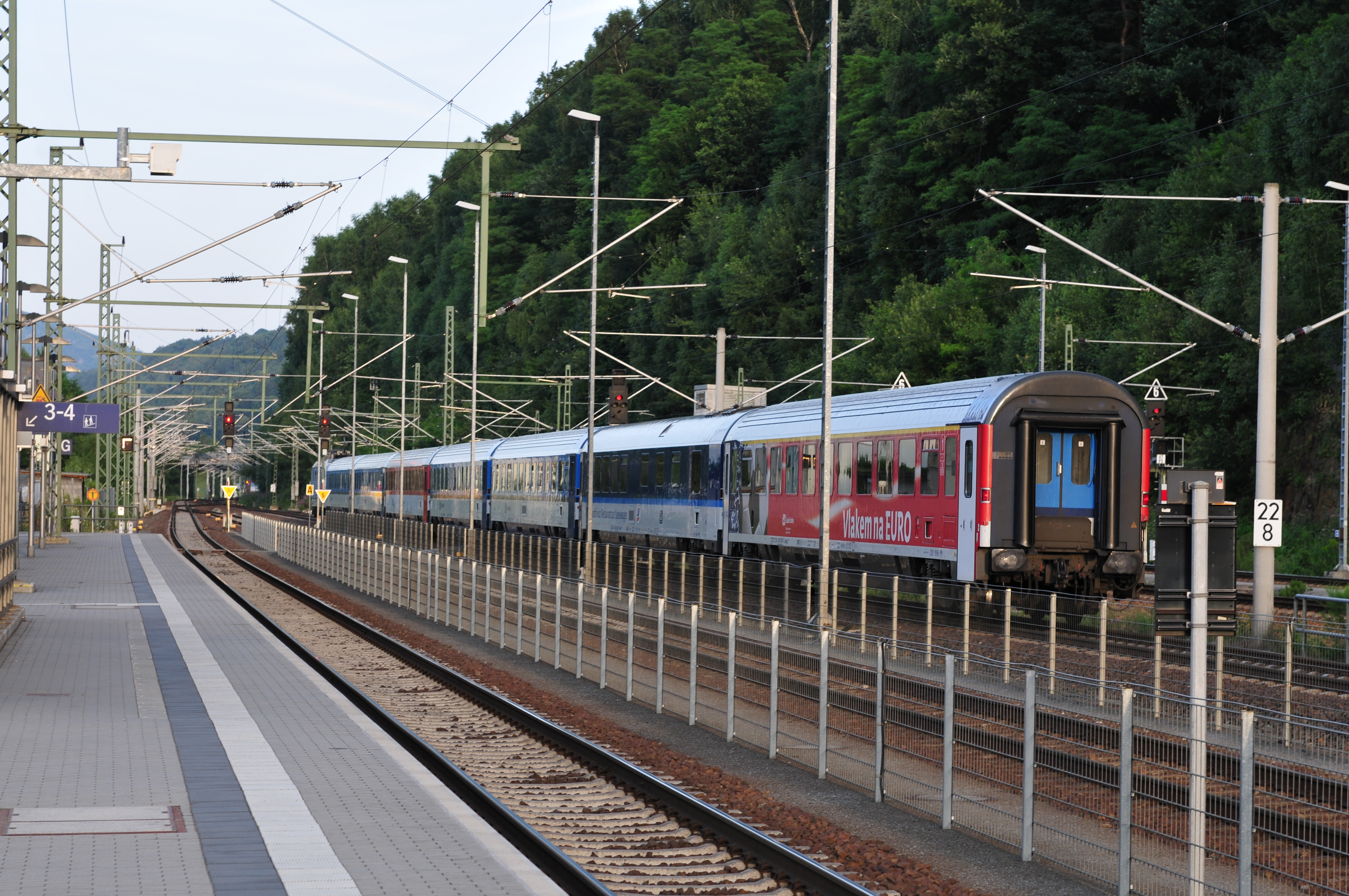
A Czech EuroCity leaving the station towards Prague

=== Development until 1945 ===
Bad Schandau received its rail connection with the opening of the Königstein–Krippen section of the Děčín–Dresden-Neustadt railway (then known as the Saxon-Bohemian Railway—Sächsisch-Böhmische Staatseisenbahn) on 9 June 1850. The last section from Krippen to the border was opened less than a year later, on 6 April 1851, completing the through railway from Dresden to Prague. At the time the current Krippen station was the station of Schandau.

With the construction of Bautzen–Bad Schandau railway and the strong growth in traffic, a new station was opened in 1877 at the current location under the name of Schandau. Since July 1920, it has had its current name of Bad Schandau, with the Bad (bath) reflecting Schandau’s status as a spa town.

The station was rebuilt and enlarged in 1920. In this context, it received a new locomotive depot (Bahnbetriebswerk) and additional tracks. The station was mainly used for local freight and passenger traffic, but it also had significant tourist traffic for visitors to the region. In 1945 the second track and parts of the station tracks were dismantled as war reparations to the Soviet Union.

=== Development after 1945 ===
The signing of the “interim agreement on mutual railway operations at the Prostřední Žleb-Bad Schandau border crossing” on 31 August 1947 was of crucial importance for Bad Schandau station. This agreement between the Czechoslovak State Railways (ČSD) and Deutsche Reichsbahn (DR) provided that the handover of all cross-border trains would take place in Bad Schandau and so the station became a border station handling frontier and customs formalities for cross-border freight and passenger traffic.

Extensive changes were made during the electrification of the line from 1970 to 1976. In addition to changes to the railway tracks, a modern centralised signal box was built. The old signal boxes were demolished in the subsequent years. In addition, the railway to Krippen was realigned, a modern road bridge was built over the Elbe and two new overpasses were built over the railway yard as part of this project.

On 22 October 1980, a fire damaged the attic of the station building. In July 1981, the goods shed burned down.

Before the political changes in 1989 more and more people tried to leave East Germany via Czechoslovakia and the Stasi ordered "suspicious" passengers on trains towards Czechoslovakia off the train at the border control at Bad Schandau and sent them back, if necessary.

Even after the fall of the wall, Bad Schandau station initially retained its significance for freight traffic. In the mid-1990s, however, there were significant declines especially in freight, which were exacerbated after the merger of Deutsche Reichsbahn and Deutsche Bundesbahn as Deutsche Bahn AG. This development led to a significant reduction of shunting and the use of existing sidings, so these were also partially dismantled.

Between 2008 and 2011 there was a fundamental reorganisation of the station and the station building, which has been owned by the town of Bad Schandau since 2010. Since then, there has been a tourist information centre, a bicycle rental service and an organic market as well as access to the platforms for the disabled. In addition, car and bicycle parking and interchange opportunities to buses and the ferry were created. The Allianz pro Schiene (Pro-Rail Alliance) gave the station the award of "Station of the Year in 2012 (Special Prize tourism)".

=== Bad Schandau locomotive depot ===
When the station was constructed a simple sandstone building for refuelling locomotives was also built. In the 1920s, a turntable was built and the depot was enlarged. The Bad Schandau locomotive depot (Bahnbetriebswerk) was founded in 1925.

On 31 December 1963, the depot was disbanded as an independent agency and made subordinate to the Pirna locomotive depot. The work site was closed in 1994. The whole site was demolished in the 2000s.

== Train services ==
The station is served by several train services operated by Deutsche Bahn (including Dresden S-Bahn line S1). The station is also served by EuroCity services from Hamburg and Berlin to Prague, Bratislava and Budapest as well as by certain Nighttrains (EuroNight and CityNightLine). In the 2026 timetable the following services stop at the station:

Line	Route	Frequency
RJ 27	Hamburg-Altona/Copenhagen/Kiel – Hamburg – Ludwigslust – Wittenberge – Berlin – Dresden – Bad Schandau – Děčín – Prague (– Brno – Bratislava – Budapest Keleti)	Every 2 hours
ES	Brussels – Rotterdam – Amsterdam – Amersfoort – Bad Bentheim – Berlin – Dresden – Bad Schandau – Prague	1 train pair thrice a week
RE 20	Dresden Hbf – Heidenau – Pirna – Bad Schandau – Schöna – Děčín – Ústí nad Labem hl.n. – Litoměřice město	2 train pair on weekends and public holidays in the summer
U 28	Rumburk – Sebnitz – Bad Schandau – Schöna – Děčín	Every 2 hours
S 1	Meißen Triebischtal – Coswig – Radebeul Ost – Dresden-Neustadt – Dresden Hbf – Heidenau – Pirna – Bad Schandau – Schöna	Every 30 minutes
