= Krippen station =

Railway station in Saxony, Germany

Krippen
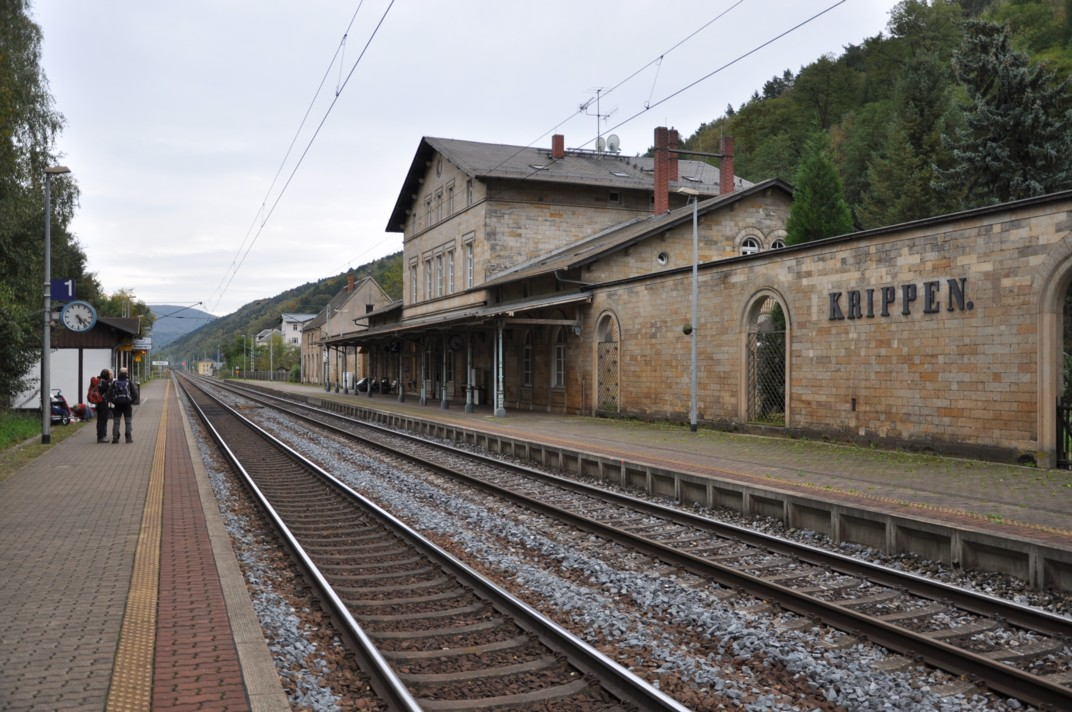
- Krippen station

General information
- Location: Friedrich-Gottlob-Kellerstr. 7, Krippen, Bad Schandau Saxony, Germany
- Coordinates: 50°54′45″N 14°09′38″E
- System: Through station
- Line: Děčín–Dresden-Neustadt railway
- Platforms: 2
- Tracks: 2

Other information
- Station code: 3424
- DS100 code: DKRP
- Category: 6

History
- Opened: 9 June 1850
- Former names: Schandau

Services
| Preceding station | DB Regio Südost | Following station |
|---|---|---|
| Bad Schandau towards Rumburk | U 28 | Schmilka-Hirschmühle towards Děčín main |
| Preceding station | Dresden S-Bahn | Following station |
| Bad Schandau towards Meißen Triebischtal | S 1 | Schmilka-Hirschmühle towards Schöna |
Location
- Location within Saxony Location within Germany Location within Europe

Krippen (German: Bahnhof Krippen) is a railway station in the village of Krippen in the municipality of Bad Schandau, Saxony, Germany. The station was opened with the Königstein–Krippen section of the Děčín–Dresden-Neustadt railway (then known as the Saxon-Bohemian Railway—Sächsisch-Böhmische Staatseisenbahn) as Schandau station on 9 June 1850. It was renamed Krippen in 1877 when Bad Schandau station opened.

The station is served by the Dresden S-Bahn S1 service from Meißen, Dresden, Heidenau, Pirna to Schöna. There is also a Regionalbahn (National Park Railway) service every 2 hours from Děčín to Rumburk via Bad Schandau and Sebnitz.
