= Schmilka-Hirschmühle station =

Railway station in Saxony, Germany

Schmilka-Hirschmühle
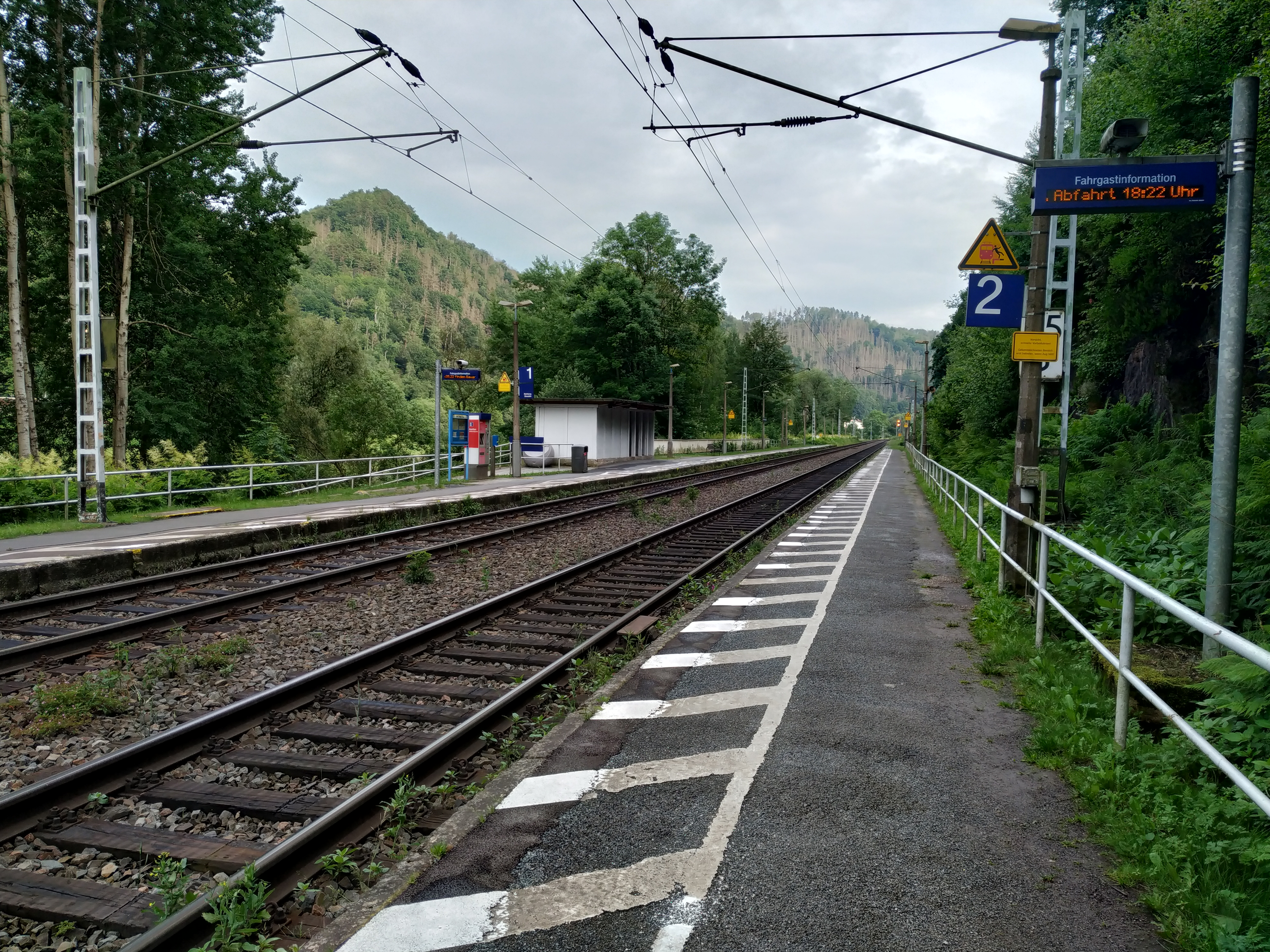
- Schmilka-Hirschmühle railway halt

General information
- Location: Elbradweg, Schmilka, Saxony, Germany
- Coordinates: 50°53′25″N 14°13′38″E
- Line: Děčín–Dresden-Neustadt railway
- Platforms: 2
- Tracks: 2

Services
Preceding station	DB Regio Südost	Following station
Krippen towards Rumburk	U 28	Schöna towards Děčín main
Preceding station	Dresden S-Bahn	Following station
Krippen towards Meißen Triebischtal	S 1	Schöna Terminus
Location
- Location within Saxony Location within Germany Location within Europe

Schmilka-Hirschmühle station (German: Haltepunkt Schmilka-Hirschmühle) is a railway halt on the Děčín–Dresden-Neustadt railway for the village of Schmilka, Saxony, Germany. The station is located across the Elbe river and can be reached from Schmilka by ferry. They station lies in the Reinhardtsdorf-Schöna municipality.

The station is served by the Dresden S-Bahn S1 service from Meißen, Dresden, Heidenau, Pirna to Schöna. There is also a Regionalbahn (National Park Railway) service every 2 hours from Děčín to Rumburk via Bad Schandau and Sebnitz.
