= Proboštov =

- Municipality
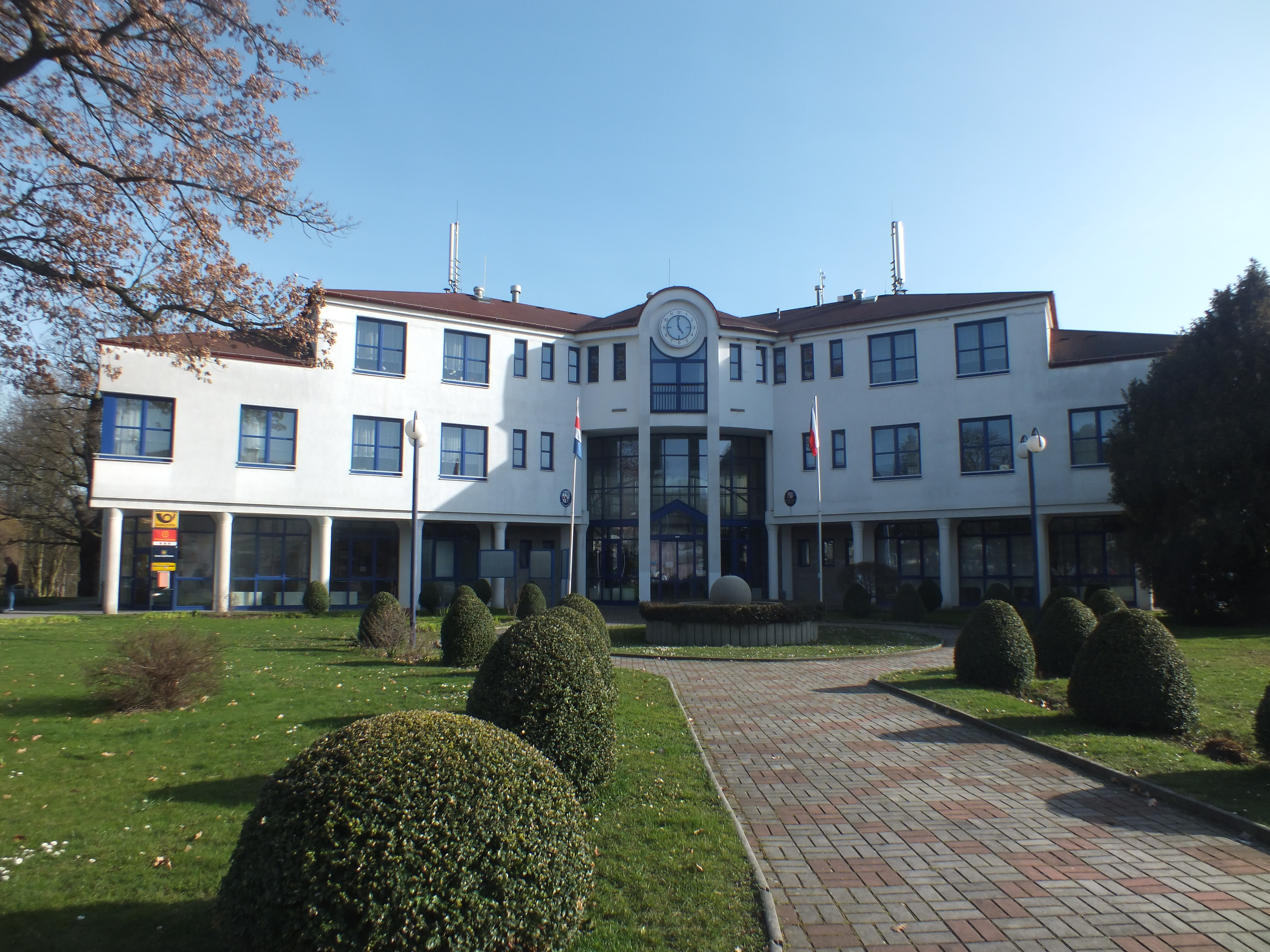
- Municipal office

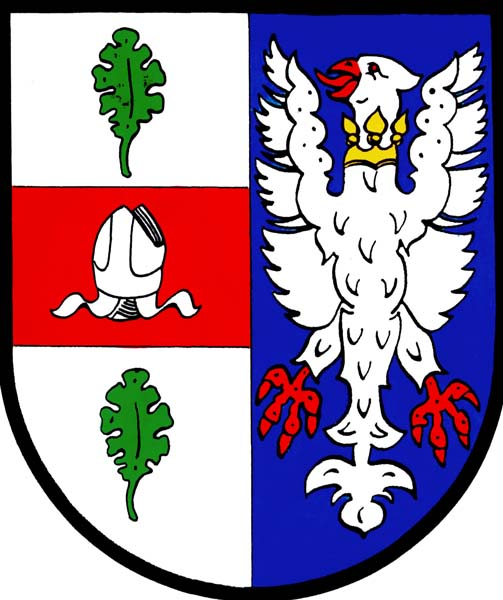
- Flag Coat of arms

- Location in the Czech Republic
- Coordinates: 50°40′4″N 13°50′10″E
- Country: Czech Republic
- Region: Ústí nad Labem
- District: Teplice
- First mentioned: 1156

Area
  - Total: 3.74 km^{2} (1.44 sq mi)
- Elevation: 245 m (804 ft)

Population (2026-01-01)
  - Total: 2,712
  - Density: 725/km^{2} (1,880/sq mi)
- Time zone: UTC+1 (CET)
  - Summer (DST): UTC+2 (CEST)
- Postal code: 417 12
- Website: www.ouprobostov.cz

Proboštov (Czech pronunciation: [ˈproboʃtof], German: Probstau) is a municipality and village in Teplice District in the Ústí nad Labem Region of the Czech Republic. It has about 2,700 inhabitants. It is urbanistically fused with the city of Teplice.

== Administrative division ==
Proboštov consists of two municipal parts (in brackets population according to the 2021 census):

- Proboštov (2,383)
- Přítkov (233)

== Etymology ==
The name was derived from the word probošt (i.e. 'provost') and refers to the fact that the village was originally a monastic property.

== Geography ==
Proboštov is located about 12 kilometres (7 mi) west of Ústí nad Labem. The municipality is located north of Teplice and is urbanistically fused with this city. It lies mostly in the Most Basin. The northernmost part of the municipal territory lies in the Ore Mountains and includes the highest point of Proboštov at 404 m (1,325 ft) above sea level. The stream Modlanský potok flows through the municipality.

== History ==
The first written mention of Proboštov is from 1156, when Queen Judith of Thuringia donated the village to the Benedictine monastery in Teplice. The monastery owned the village until the Hussite Wars, when the Hussites burned down the monastery. The estate changed owners several times until 1512, when it was acquired by the Waldstein family. During the 16th century, the village was settled by German settlers. Proboštov was badly damaged during the Thirty Years' War and recovered only slowly.

The railway near Proboštov was built in 1858 and the area became industrialised. Czechs from the hinterland began to move into the village and formed a large minority.

== Demographics ==
Historical population

Year	Pop.	±%
1869	386	—
1880	853	+121.0%
1890	1,152	+35.1%
1900	2,086	+81.1%
1910	2,684	+28.7%

Year	Pop.	±%
1921	3,092	+15.2%
1930	3,920	+26.8%
1950	2,387	−39.1%
1961	2,931	+22.8%
1970	2,523	−13.9%

Year	Pop.	±%
1980	2,341	−7.2%
1991	2,075	−11.4%
2001	2,240	+8.0%
2011	2,528	+12.9%
2021	2,616	+3.5%

Source: Censuses

== Transport ==
Proboštov is located on the railway lines Ústí nad Labem–Litvínov and Děčín–Kadaň; however, the train station called Proboštov is situated just outside the municipal territory.

The Děčín–Jeníkov-Oldřichov line with limited traffic runs through the northern part of the municipality, but there is no train station.

== Sights ==
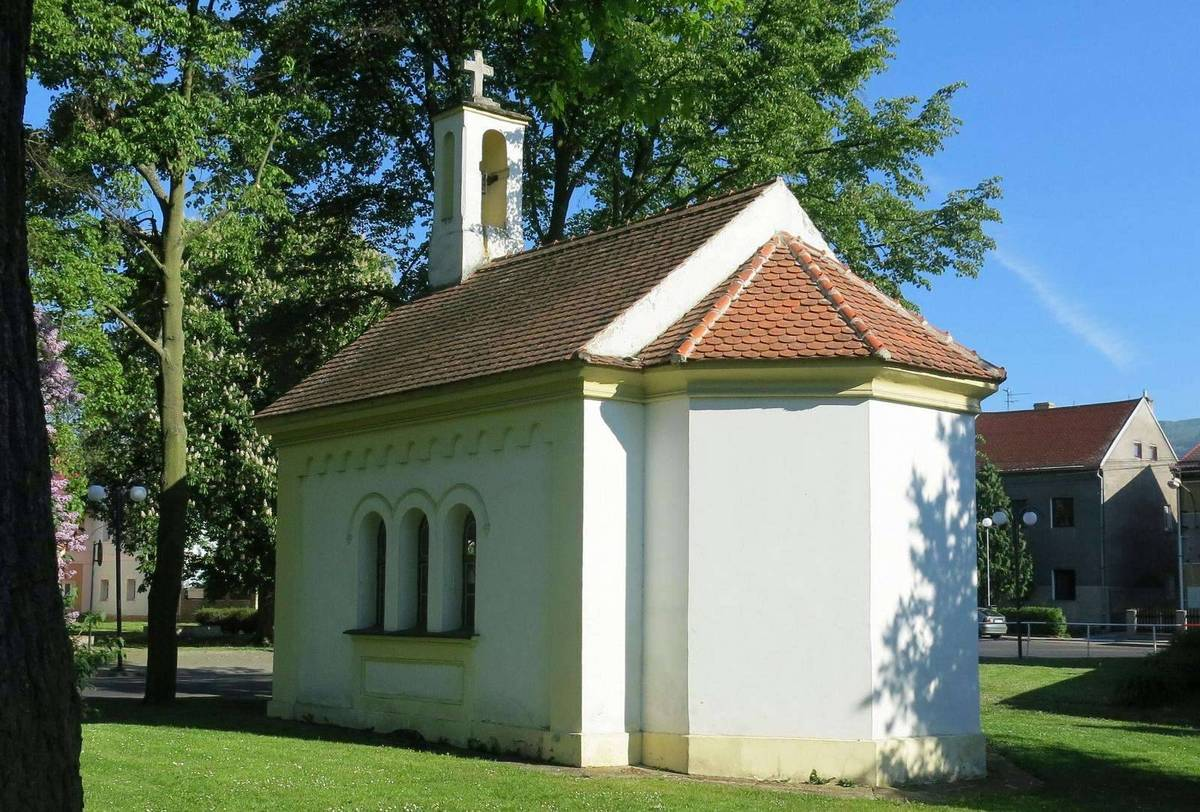
Chapel of Saint Anthony of Padua

There are no protected cultural monuments in the municipality.

The main landmark of Proboštov is the Chapel of Saint Anthony of Padua. Originally a Baroque building, it was rebuilt to its present Neo-Romanesque form in 1881.

== Notable people ==
- Roman Postl (1969–2008), spree killer
