= Goßdorf-Kohlmühle station =

Railway station in Saxony, Germany

Goßdorf-Kohlmühle
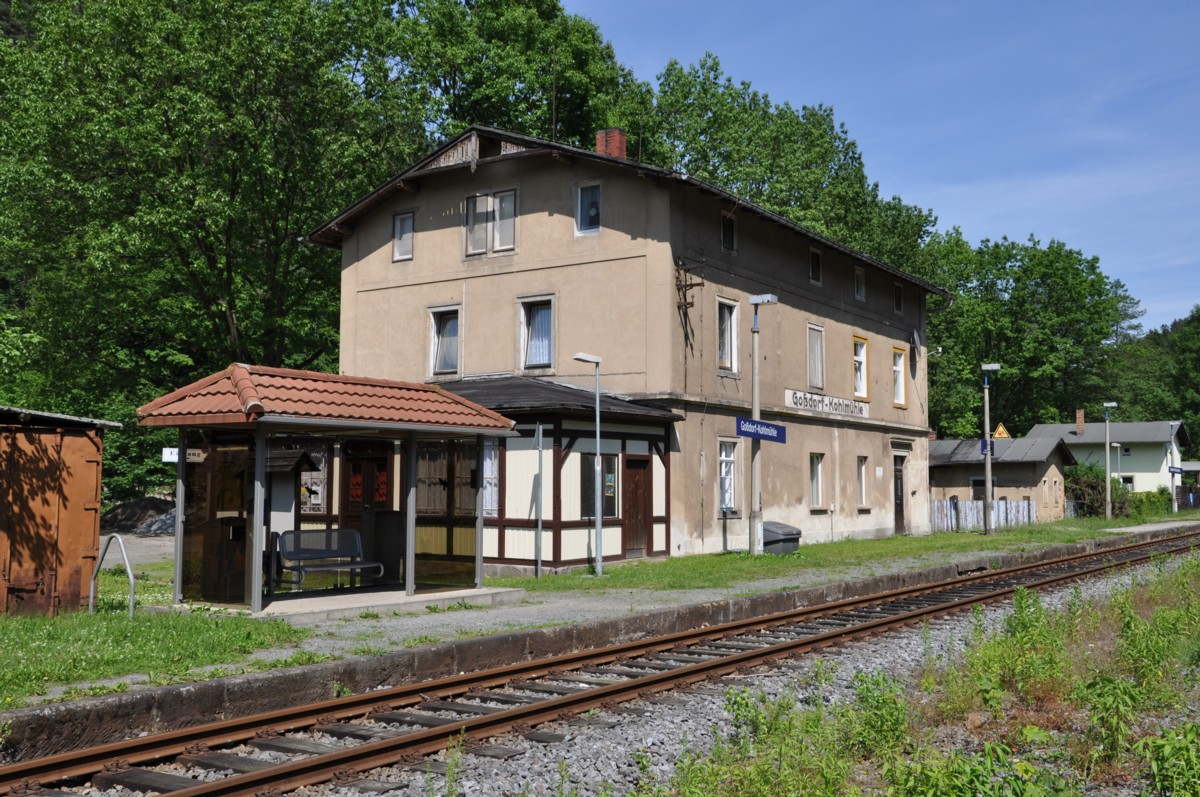
- Goßdorf-Kohlmühle station

General information
- Location: Kohlmühle, Saxony, Germany
- Coordinates: 50°56′27″N 14°09′52″E
- Line: Bautzen–Bad Schandau railway
- Platforms: 1
- Tracks: 1

History
- Opened: 1 May 1877

Services
| Preceding station | DB Regio Südost | Following station |
|---|---|---|
| Porschdorf towards Děčín main | U 28 | Mittelndorf towards Rumburk |
Location
- Location within Saxony

Goßdorf-Kohlmühle (German: Bahnhof Goßdorf-Kohlmühle) (known as Kohlmühle until 14 May 1936) is a railway station serving the villages of Goßdorf and Kohlmühle, Saxony, Germany. The station is served by one train service, operated by DB Regio in cooperation with České dráhy: the National Park Railway. This service connects Děčín and Rumburk via Bad Schandau and Sebnitz.
