= Königstein (Sächsische Schweiz) station =

Railway station in Königstein, Germany

Königstein (Sächs Schweiz)
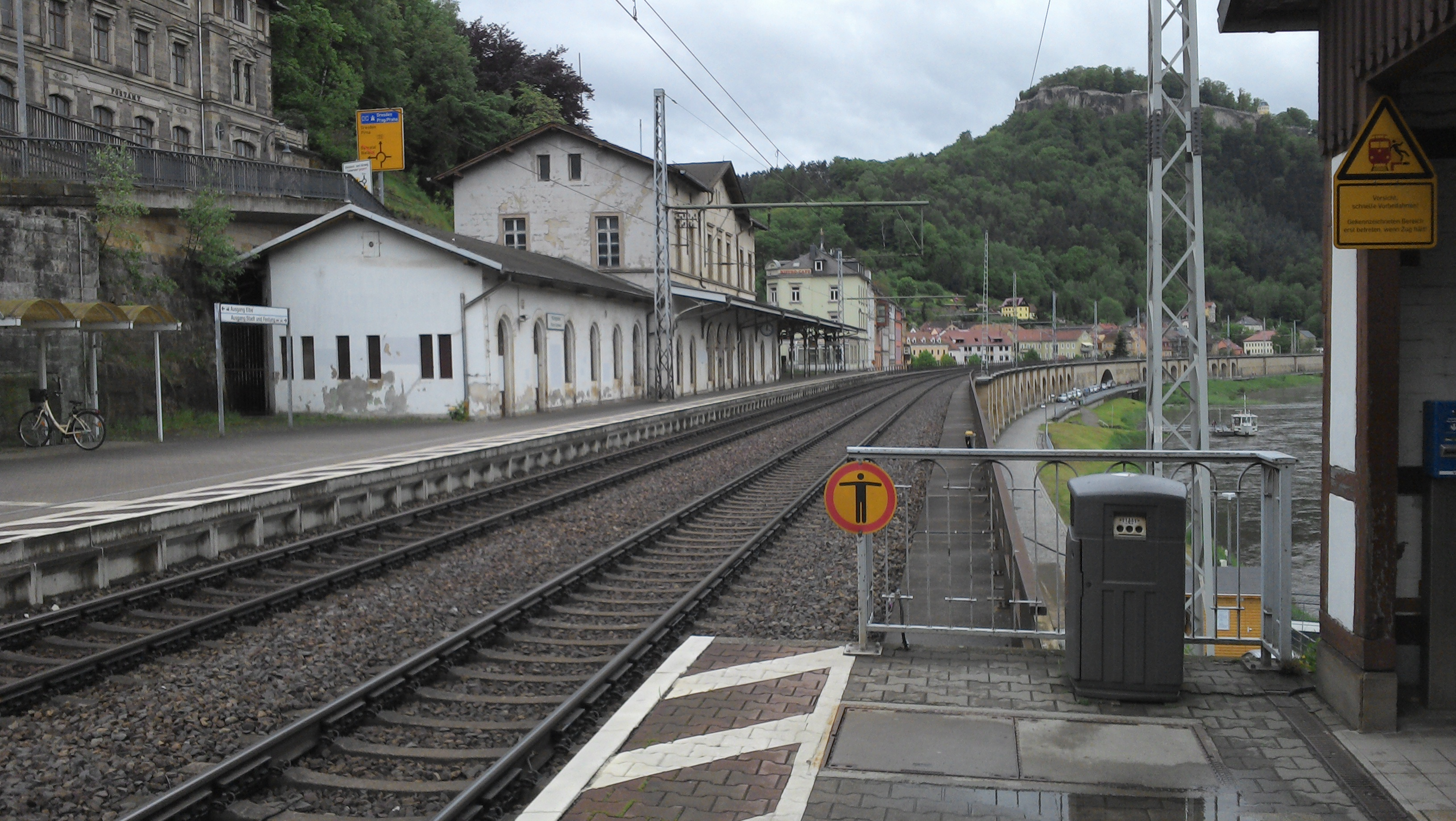

General information
- Location: Germany
- Coordinates: 50°55′9″N 14°4′41″E
- Line: Děčín hl.n.–Dresden-Neustadt
- Platforms: 2
- Tracks: 2

Other information
- Station code: 3356
- Category: 5

Services
Preceding station	Dresden S-Bahn	Following station
Kurort Rathen towards Meißen Triebischtal	S 1	Bad Schandau towards Schöna
Location
- Location within Saxony Location within Germany Location within Europe

Königstein (Sächsische Schweiz) is a station on the Dresden to Děčín line that serves the town of Königstein in the German state of Saxony.

The station is served by the Dresden S-Bahn S1 service. Trains run to Pirna, Dresden and Meißen in one direction, and to Bad Schandau and Schöna in the other direction. The service provides two trains per hour in both directions for most of each day.
