= Königstein station =

Königstein station or Königstein railway station may refer to

- Königstein (Sächsische Schweiz) station, on the Dresden S-Bahn in Saxony, Germany
- Königstein (Taunus) station, on the Königstein Railway in Hesse, Germany
