= Rathmannsdorf station =

Railway station in Rathmannsdorf, Germany

Rathmannsdorf
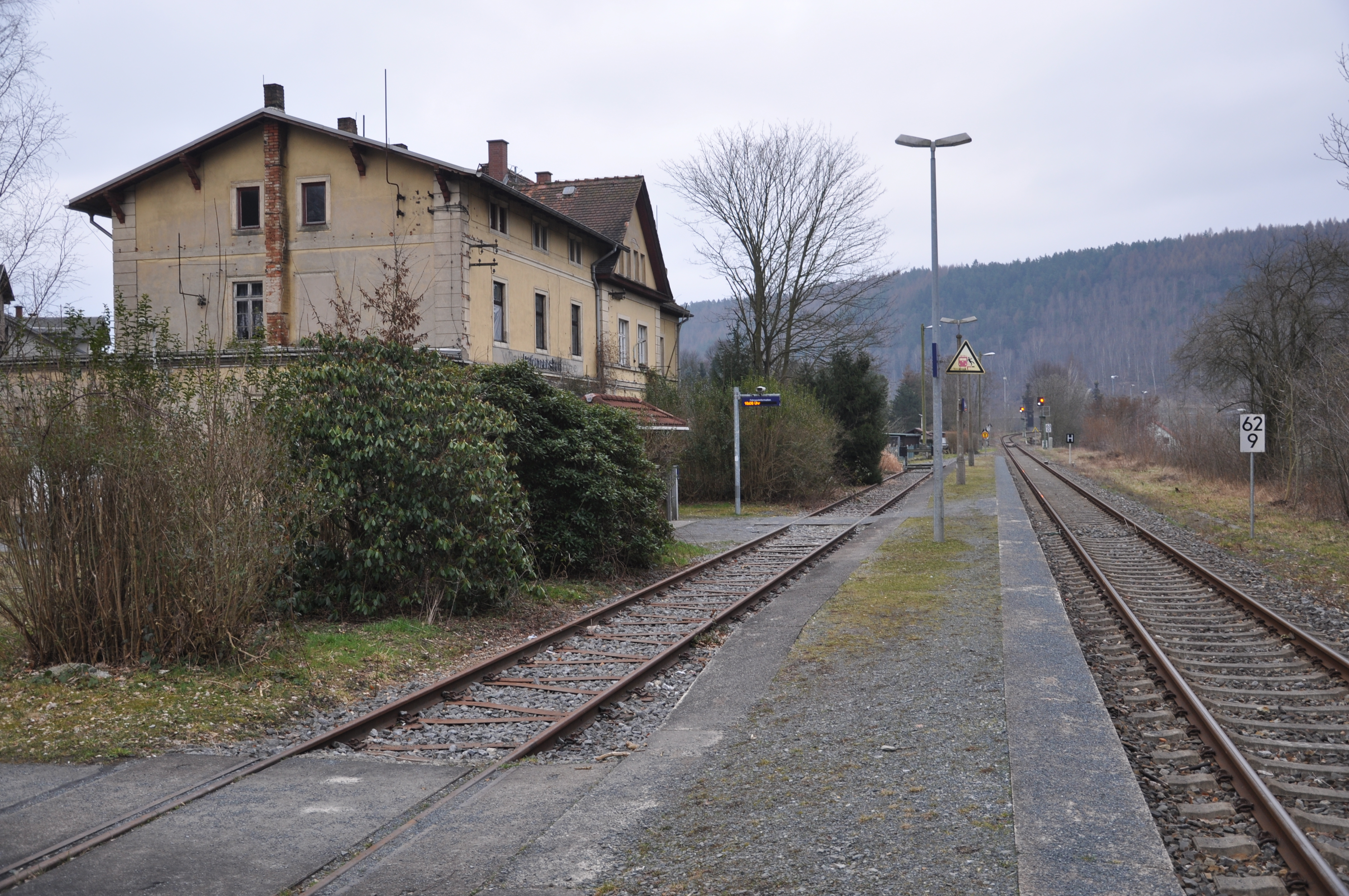
- Rathmannsdorf railway station

General information
- Location: Hohnsteiner Str. 13, Rathmannsdorf, Saxony, Germany
- Coordinates: 50°55′39″N 14°07′50″E
- Line: Bautzen–Bad Schandau railway
- Platforms: 1
- Tracks: 5

Construction
- Accessible: Yes

History
- Opened: 1 July 1877

Services
Preceding station	DB Regio Südost	Following station
Bad Schandau towards Děčín main	U 28	Porschdorf towards Rumburk
Location
- Location within Saxony

Rathmannsdorf (German: Bahnhof Rathmannsdorf) is a railway station in the village of Rathmannsdorf, Saxony, Germany. Until 1938 the station was known as Wendischfähre. The station lies on the Bautzen–Bad Schandau railway. The station is served by one train service, operated by DB Regio in cooperation with České dráhy: the National Park Railway. This service connects Děčín and Rumburk via Bad Schandau and Sebnitz.
