= Porschdorf station =

Railway station in Saxony, Germany

Porschdorf
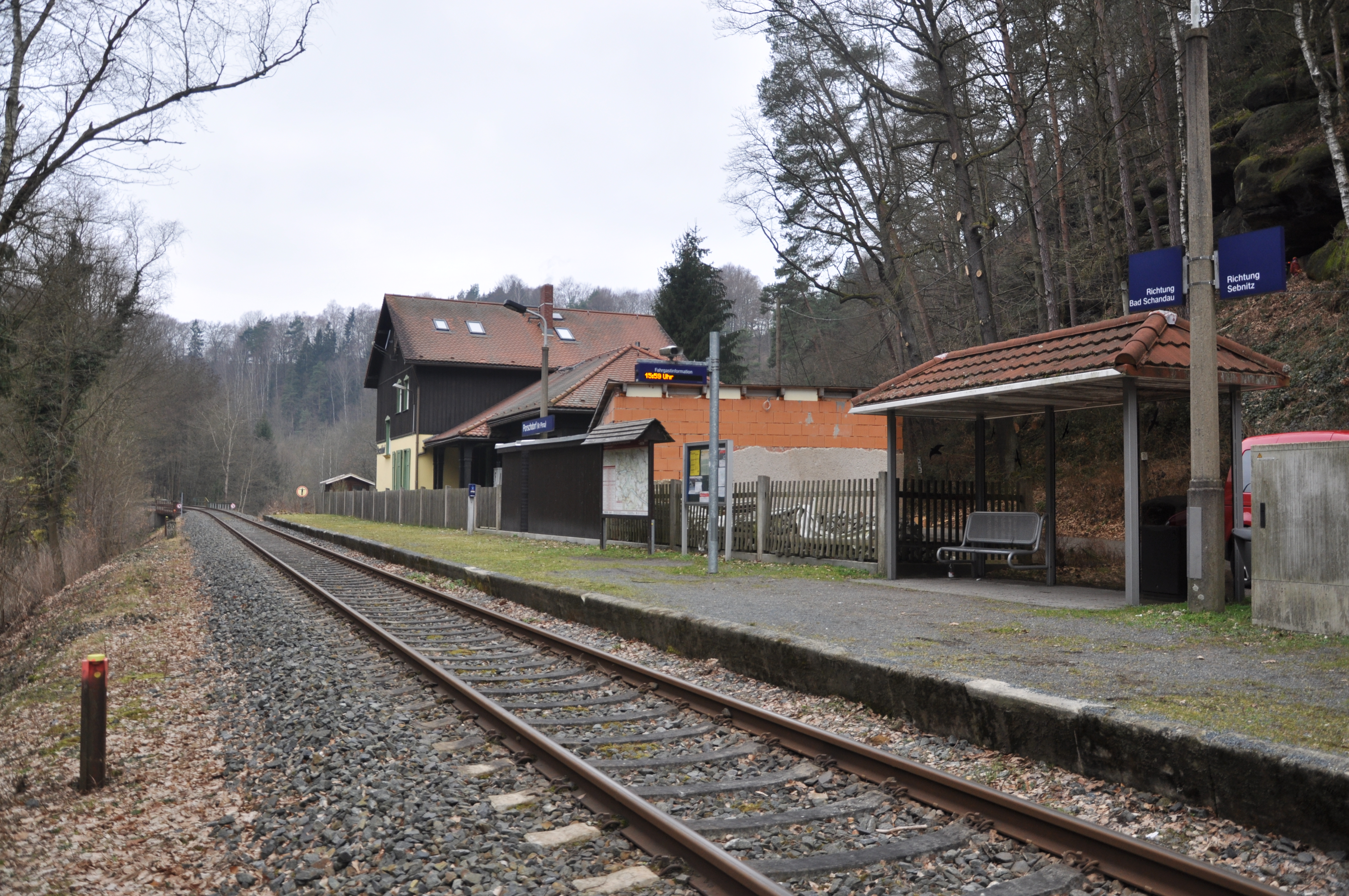
- Porschdorf railway station

General information
- Location: Porschdorf, Saxony, Germany
- Coordinates: 50°56′35″N 14°08′19″E
- Line: Bautzen–Bad Schandau railway
- Platforms: 1
- Tracks: 1

Services
Preceding station	DB Regio Südost	Following station
Rathmannsdorf towards Děčín main	U 28	Goßdorf-Kohlmühle towards Rumburk
Location
- Location within Saxony

Porschdorf (German: Haltepunkt Porschdorf) is a railway station in the village of Porschdorf in the municipality of Bad Schandau, Saxony, Germany. The station is served by one train service, operated by DB Regio in cooperation with České dráhy: the National Park Railway. This service connects Děčín and Rumburk via Bad Schandau and Sebnitz.
