= Schöna station =

Railway station in Reinhardtsdorf-Schöna, Germany

Schöna
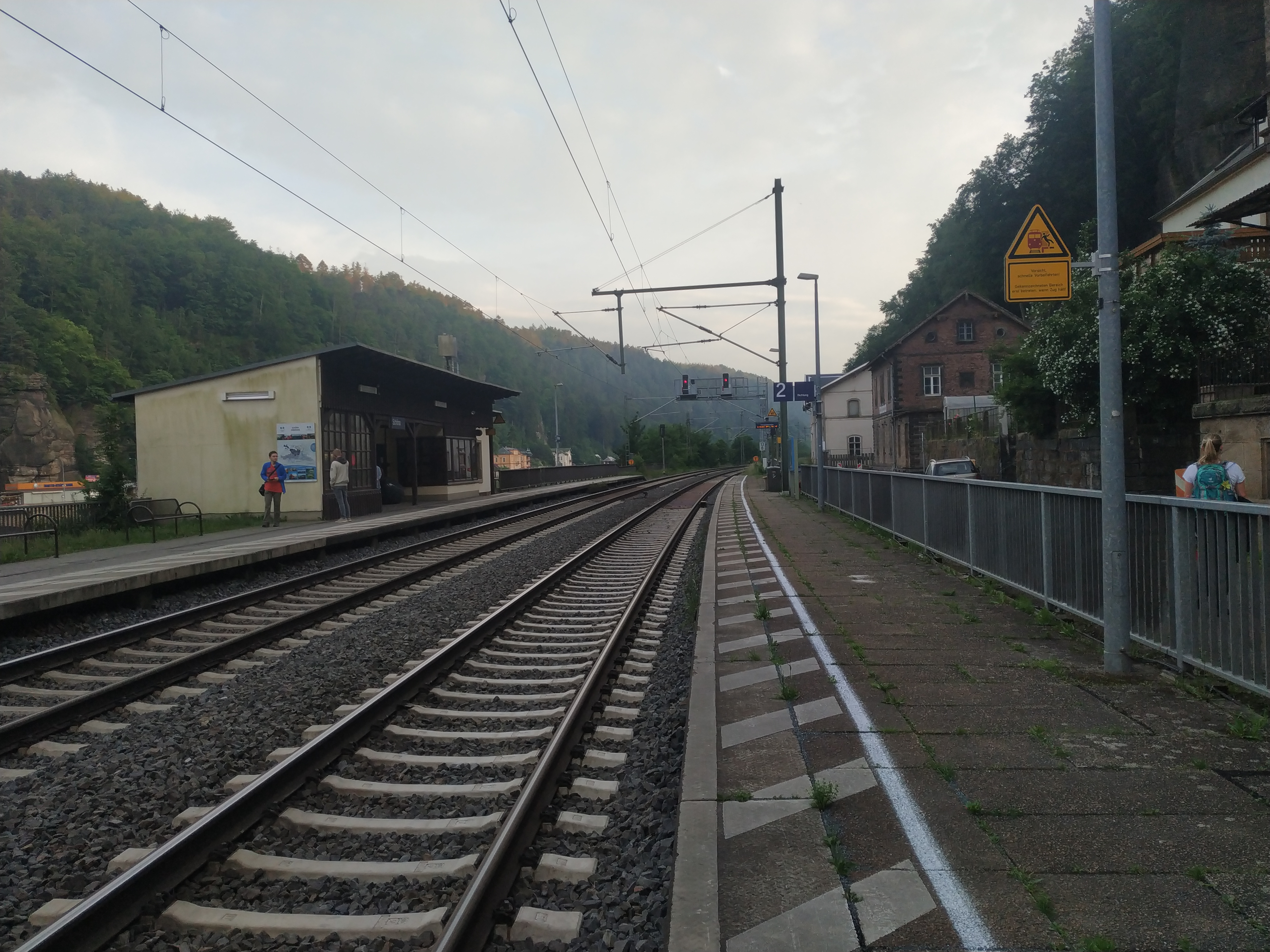
- Schöna railway station

General information
- Location: Elbradweg, Schöna, Saxony, Germany
- Coordinates: 50°52′29″N 14°14′03″E
- Line: Děčín–Dresden-Neustadt railway
- Platforms: 2
- Tracks: 2

Services
Preceding station	DB Regio Südost	Following station
Bad Schandau towards Dresden Hbf	RE 20	Dolní Žleb towards Litoměřice město
Schmilka-Hirschmühle towards Rumburk	U 28	Dolní Žleb towards Děčín main
Preceding station	Dresden S-Bahn	Following station
Schmilka-Hirschmühle towards Meißen Triebischtal	S 1	Terminus
Location
- Location within Saxony Location within Germany Location within Europe

Schöna (German: Bahnhof Schöna) is a station located on the grounds of Reinhardtsdorf-Schöna municipality, Saxony, Germany. It is the German station which is closest to, but not on, the border between Germany and the Czech Republic on the Děčín–Dresden-Neustadt railway. Bad Schandau and Děčín hlavní nádraží were border stations. There are a couple of sidings south of the station where the S1 can prepare to return towards Dresden.

There is hardly any access from the station to village of Schöna, which is outside the Elbe valley in southern direction. The station is more important to reach the village of Hřensko in the Czech Republic, which is just across the river and can be reached by ferry.

== Train services ==
The following services currently call at the station:

- Regional services RE 20 Dresden – Pirna – Bad Schandau – Děčín – Ústí nad Labem – Litoměřice (operates summer weekends)
- Local services U28 Rumburk – Dolní Poustevna – Sebnitz – Bad Schandau – Děčín
- Dresden S-Bahn S1 Meißen Triebischtal – Dresden – Heidenau – Pirna – Bad Schandau – Schöna
