= Roman Postl =

- Born: 1969; Proboštov, Czechoslovakia
- Died: September 8, 2008 (aged 38–39); Chomutov, Czech Republic
- Cause of death: Killed during a shootout

Details
- Victims: 5
- Span of crimes: 1998–2008
- Country: Czech Republic

Roman Postl (1969 in Proboštov – September 8, 2008 in Chomutov) was a Czech spree killer and drug addict who killed five people. The first murder was committed in 1998, for which he was sentenced to 13 years in prison. In April 2008 he was prematurely released for good behaviour. At a gas station in Předlice in Ústí nad Labem, he murdered Jiří Šťovíček. He shot him in the head and stole 15,000 crowns and a notebook.

Postl died in a Chomutov hospital where he was taken with gunfire wounds suffered during a shootout with the police after the murder of Van Tinh. During the shootout, intervening police officer Roman Jedlička was also shot and injured, later succumbing to his wounds in a hospital. Roman Postl was 39 years old at the time of his death.

== Victims ==
- 1 Jan Štencl (17) - shot in 1998
- 2. Karel Diviš (46) - businessman, shot on September 1, 2008
- 3. Jiří Šťovíček (20) - gas pump brigadier, shot on September 2, 2008
- 4. Dao Van Tinh (20) - Vietnamese barman, shot on September 3, 2008
- 5. Roman Jedlička (28) - policeman, shot on September 3, 2008
