= European Sleeper =

Belgian-Dutch cooperative operating sleeper train services

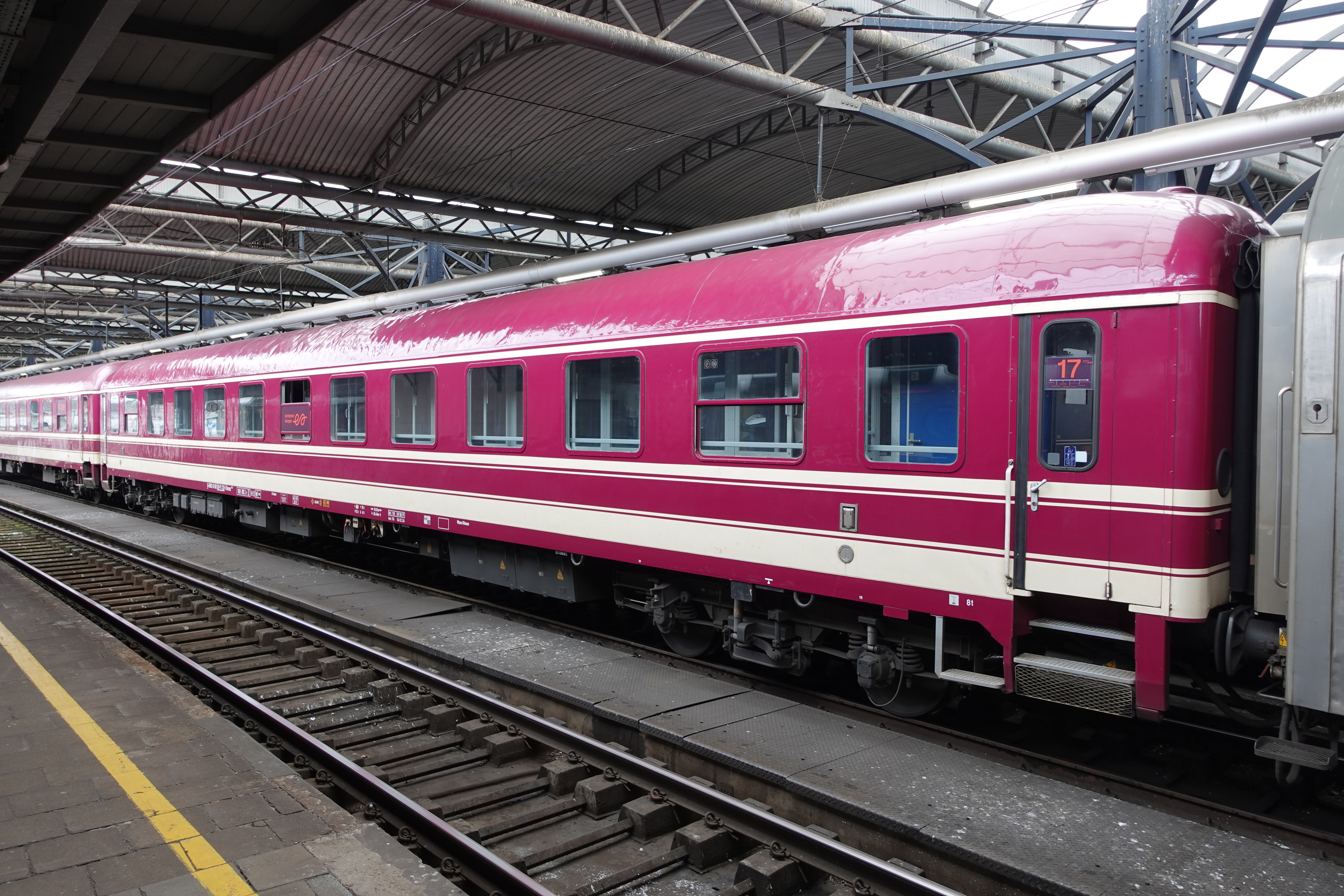
- European Sleeper couchette car at Brussels-South

Overview
- Headquarters: Utrecht, Netherlands
- Founders: Elmer van Buuren; Chris Engelsman
- Dates of operation: 2023–
- Predecessors: Moonlight Express

Other
- Website: www.europeansleeper.eu

European Sleeper (ES; stylised as european sleeper) is a Belgian–Dutch cooperative operating international open-access night train services in Europe. It currently operates three night train services: one between Brussels and Prague, which launched in May 2023; another between Paris Nord and Berlin, which it launched in March 2026; and a third route launching in September 2026 between Brussels and Milan, to be combined with coaches serving Amsterdam in December 2026.

== History ==
European Sleeper was launched in April 2021 with plans for a sleeper train service between Brussels and Prague, with Czech operator RegioJet announced as a partner. Under original plans, RegioJet would provide the rolling stock and run the service in Germany and Czechia while the National Railway Company of Belgium (SNCB) would be responsible for running the service in Belgium with an operator not yet selected for running the service in the Netherlands. The night train was expected to begin in the spring of 2022, and a second service was slated to begin in December that year.

Simultaneously, Belgian startup Moonlight Express announced its intention to commence night train services between Berlin and Brussels via Liège from April 2022. As a result, both services were expected to begin at around the same time. Owing to this, in June 2021, both European Sleeper and Moonlight Express would join forces, with the combined entity taking up the former's name and pursuing their proposal of a Brussels–Prague route.

In May 2021, European Sleeper launched a crowdfunding campaign and managed to raise €500,000 in seed capital by selling shares in the cooperative to more than 350 small investors, reportedly selling out in 15 minutes. A subsequent fundraising round was launched with €2 million worth of shares sold to 1,400 investors.

In May 2022, the company announced that the Brussels–Prague route would be delayed indefinitely with no revised start date being provided until December. By then, the planned service, beginning in 2023, would initially terminate at Berlin due to capacity constraints south of Dresden owing to infrastructure works on the Elbe Valley Railway. The scaled-back route commenced operations on 25 May 2023.

In June 2023, a third fundraising round for €3 million of growth capital was announced, which opened to investors at a starting price of €250 per share. At the same time, ES announced it had sold 10,000 tickets for its existing Berlin–Brussels service, and that Interrail and Eurail passes would be accepted on services from 1 July with mandatory reservations to be made. The route was extended to Prague on 26 March 2024.

A seasonal service linking Brussels with Innsbruck and Venice ran in February and March 2025, though due to last-minute logistical problems with Arenaways, the open-access operator undertaking responsibility for the train in Italy, European Sleeper was unable to run some of its services to Venice. The dispute was eventually resolved after an agreement was reached with FS Treni Turistici. The seasonal service was joined by a dining car as part of a trial operation which first launched on the Brussels–Prague route in October 2024.

In April and June 2025, ES raised €1.5 million in 3-year loan stocks at 8% interest and also attracted some donations. Throughout the latter half of 2025, the company also offered a further €2m of shares for sale, with the stated aims of acquiring Dutch tour operator GreenCityTrip, securing additional rolling stock and launching a new route in 2026.

On 12 November 2025, a thrice-weekly Berlin–Paris service was announced by European Sleeper for launch on 26 March 2026 as a direct response to ÖBB's decision to cancel its Nightjet services from Paris to Berlin and Vienna from 14 December 2025 following the withdrawal of subsidies provided by the French government. Sleeper trains later made an additional stop at Hamburg-Harburg from 13 July 2026, providing onward connections to Scandinavia.

Soon after the announcement of the new Berlin–Paris route, on 10 December 2025 European Sleeper announced another new thrice-weekly service from Brussels and Amsterdam to Milan. It initially planned to serve Bern, Brig, and Stresa on Lake Maggiore following the Simplon route, and, in a first for the company, it would split and combine train parts at Cologne to serve Brussels and Amsterdam separately, which it argued was necessary to offer suitable departure and arrival times from each of these three cities. However, the route was revised in March 2026 by following the Gotthard pass instead of the Simplon pass due to construction works throughout 2027, now serving Zurich, Göschenen, Lugano and Como. The Milan service launched on 9 September 2026.

== Other plans ==
In June 2022, a partnership with tour operator Sunweb Group was announced, with plans to start new night train services between the Netherlands and French ski resorts by summer 2023 with an extension to southern France the following year. In November, it was announced by the two parties that these plans would be put on hold, citing difficulties in securing rolling stock, track access rights and an operator for the services.

European Sleeper's proposed service from Amsterdam to Barcelona was selected in January 2023 as a pilot project as part of the European Commission's efforts to improve cross-border rail service and encourage the opening of new links. It joins two other night train proposals from Snälltåget and Midnight Trains. In September 2024, ES confirmed that the proposed Barcelona service would be delayed until at least 2026 after the company failed to reach an agreement to operate through France. Despite the launch of the Milan route in 2026, the company is still preparing for a route to Barcelona as a next step, probably starting operations in 2029.

=== Future routes ===
In late August 2026, a new route from Brussels through Amsterdam and Copenhagen to Malmö was announced. It would run three times per week from April 2028.

== Rolling stock ==
European Sleeper leases its passenger sleeping cars and couchette cars from Train Charter Services and RDC Germany, dating back from the 1950s to the 1990s and being renewed more recently by various national railway companies, which are maintained at Lengerich depot near Münster while locomotives are hired from Railpool for the majority of ES's routes and Arenaways within Italy. Some of ES's coaches used in its services also include former Compagnie Internationale des Wagons-Lits type-P sleeper cars used on luxury trains in the 20th century.

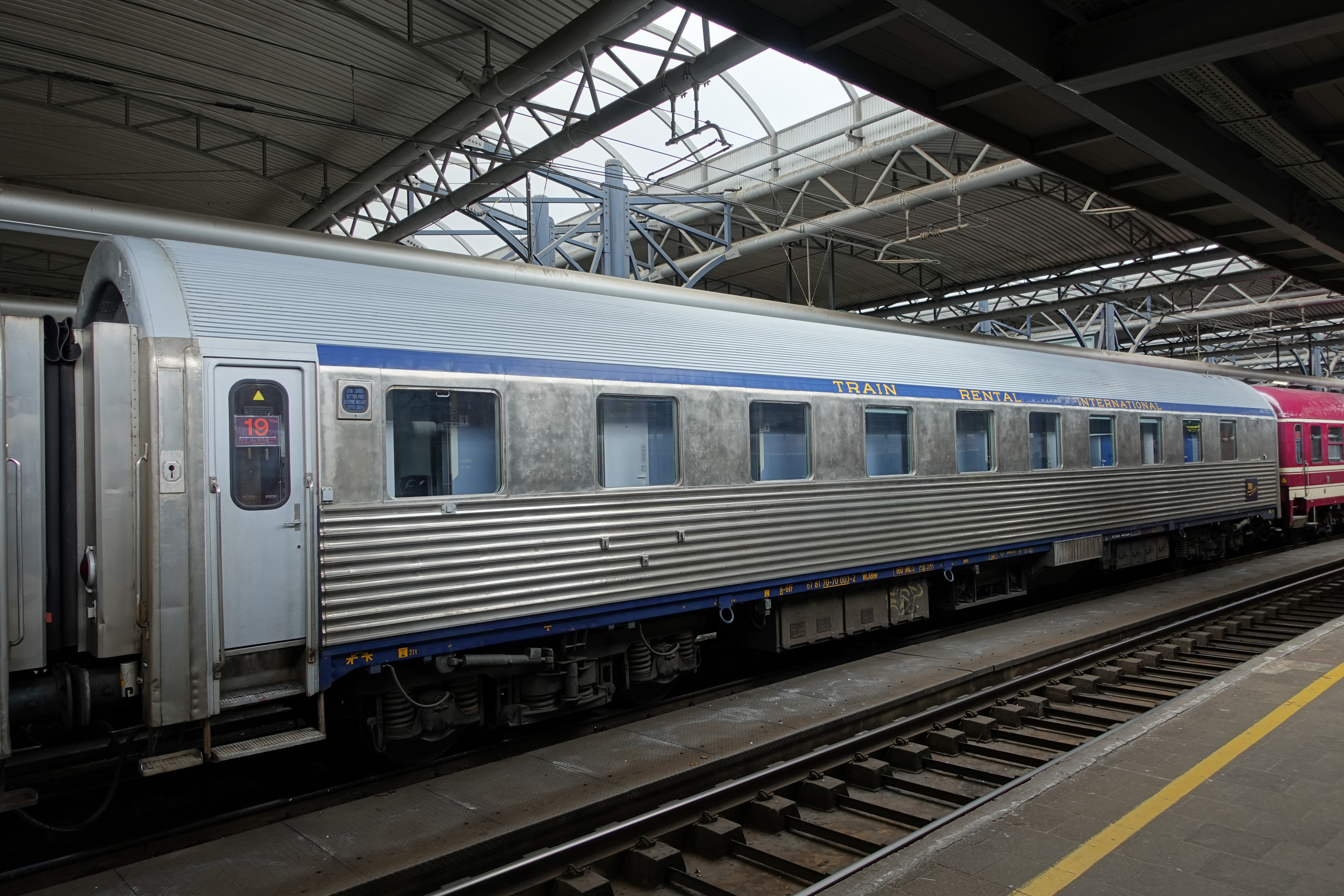
WLABm sleeping car AB30 (CIWL type P) in service for European Sleeper.

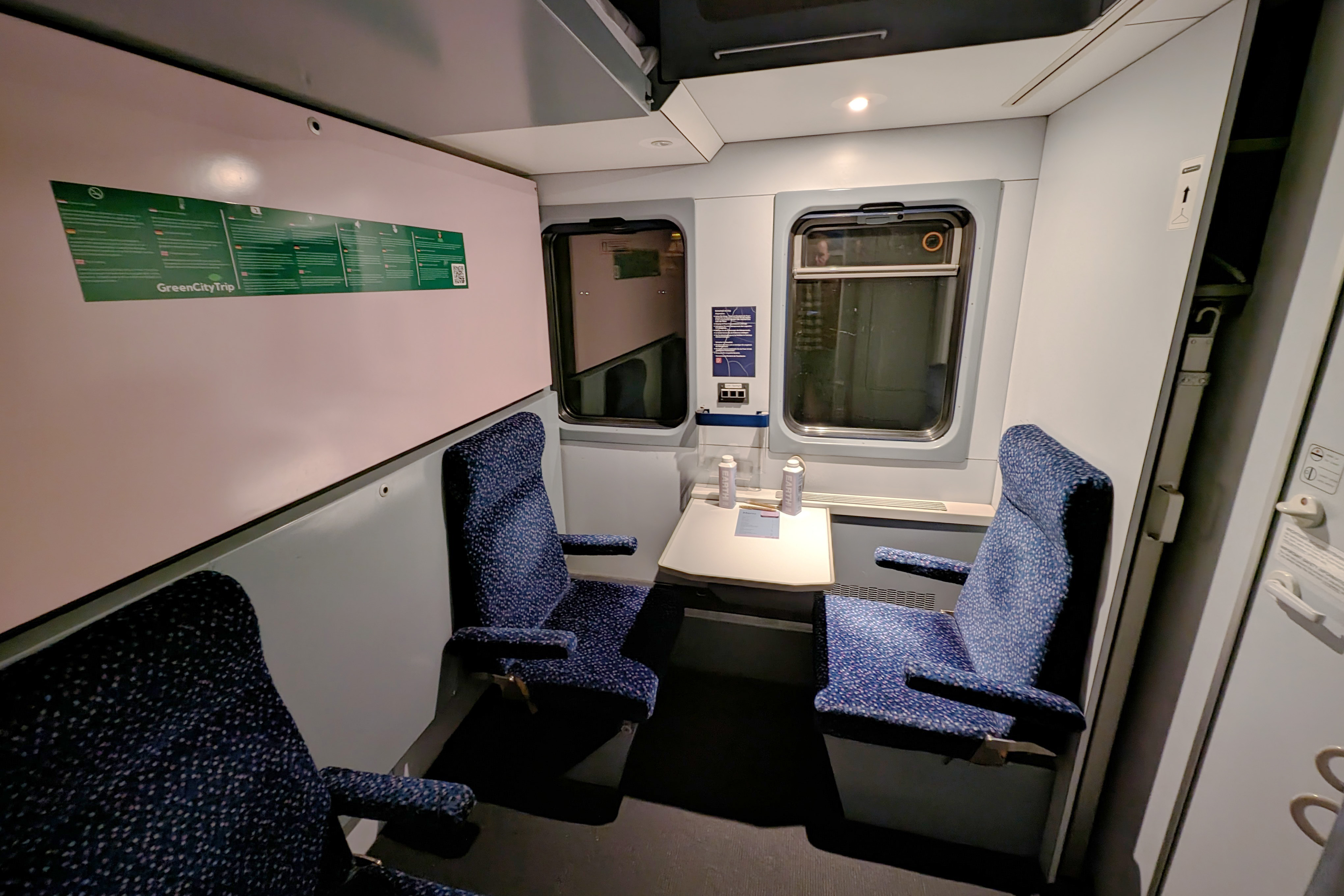
Compartment of a WLABm AB30 sleeping car (CIWL type P) in service with European Sleeper.

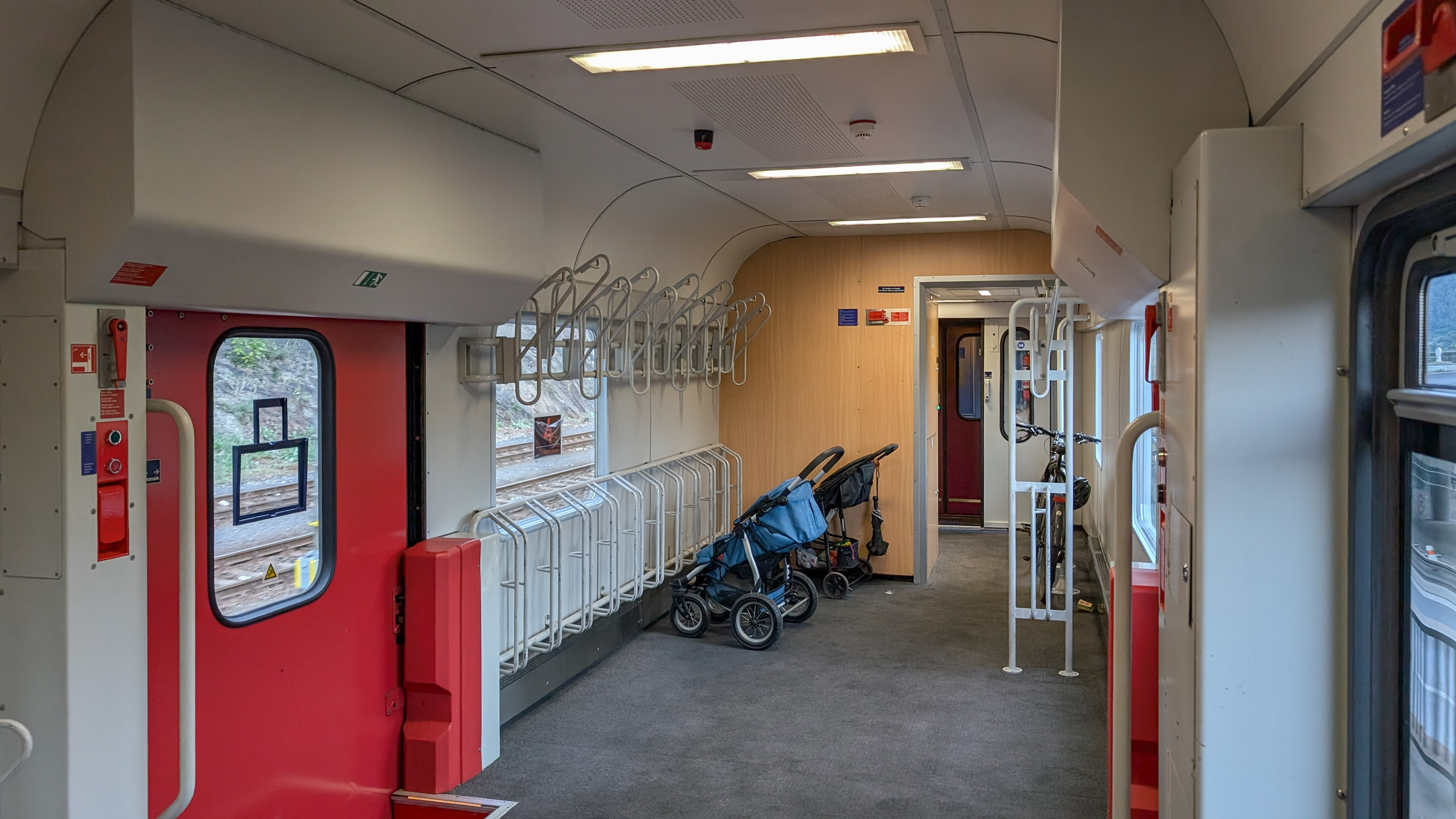
Bicycle storage area in a couchette car of type BDcm, rented from TRI during the summer months.

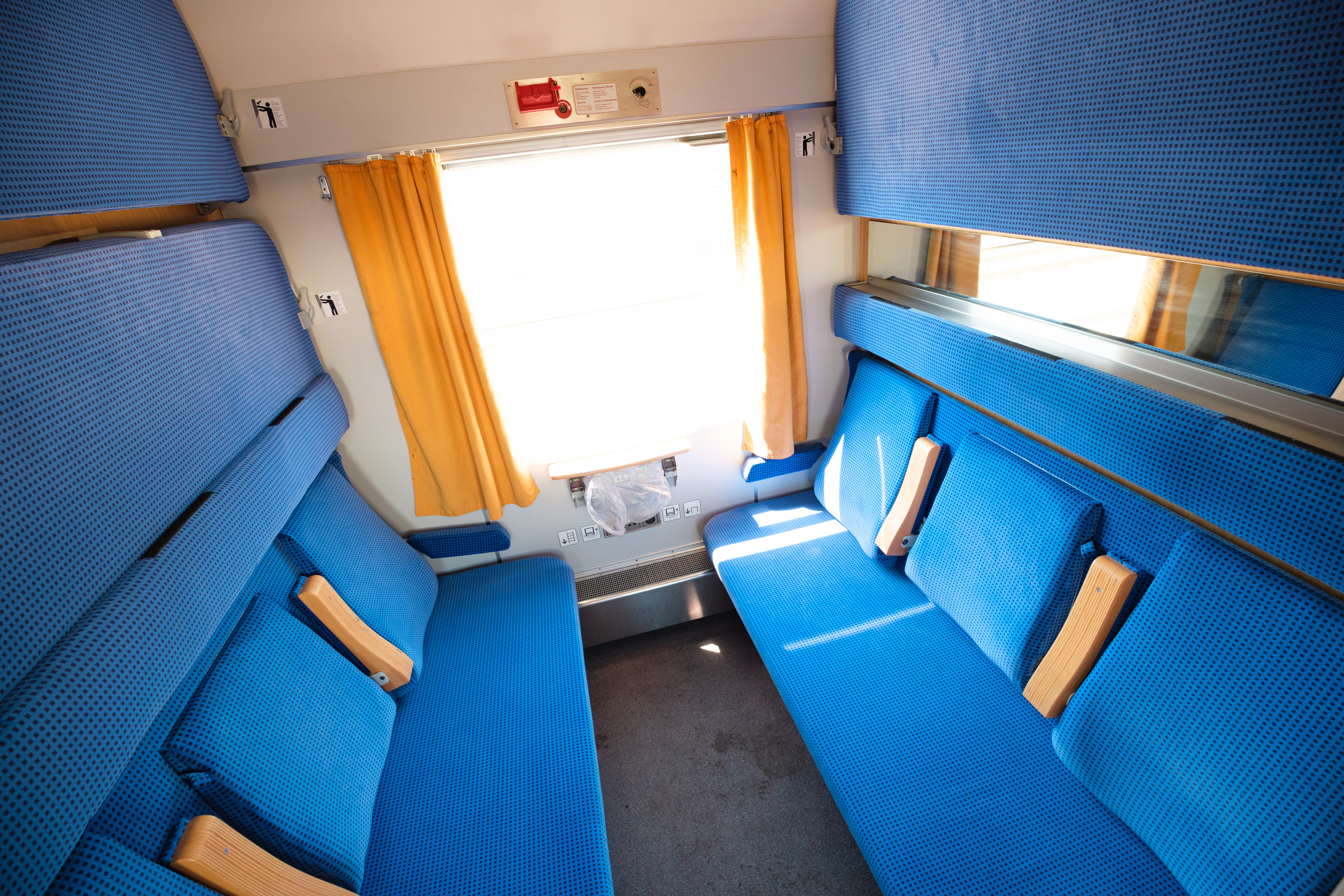
Compartment of one of the air-conditioned Bvcmz 248.1 couchette cars with only five berths.
