= Pannonia Express =

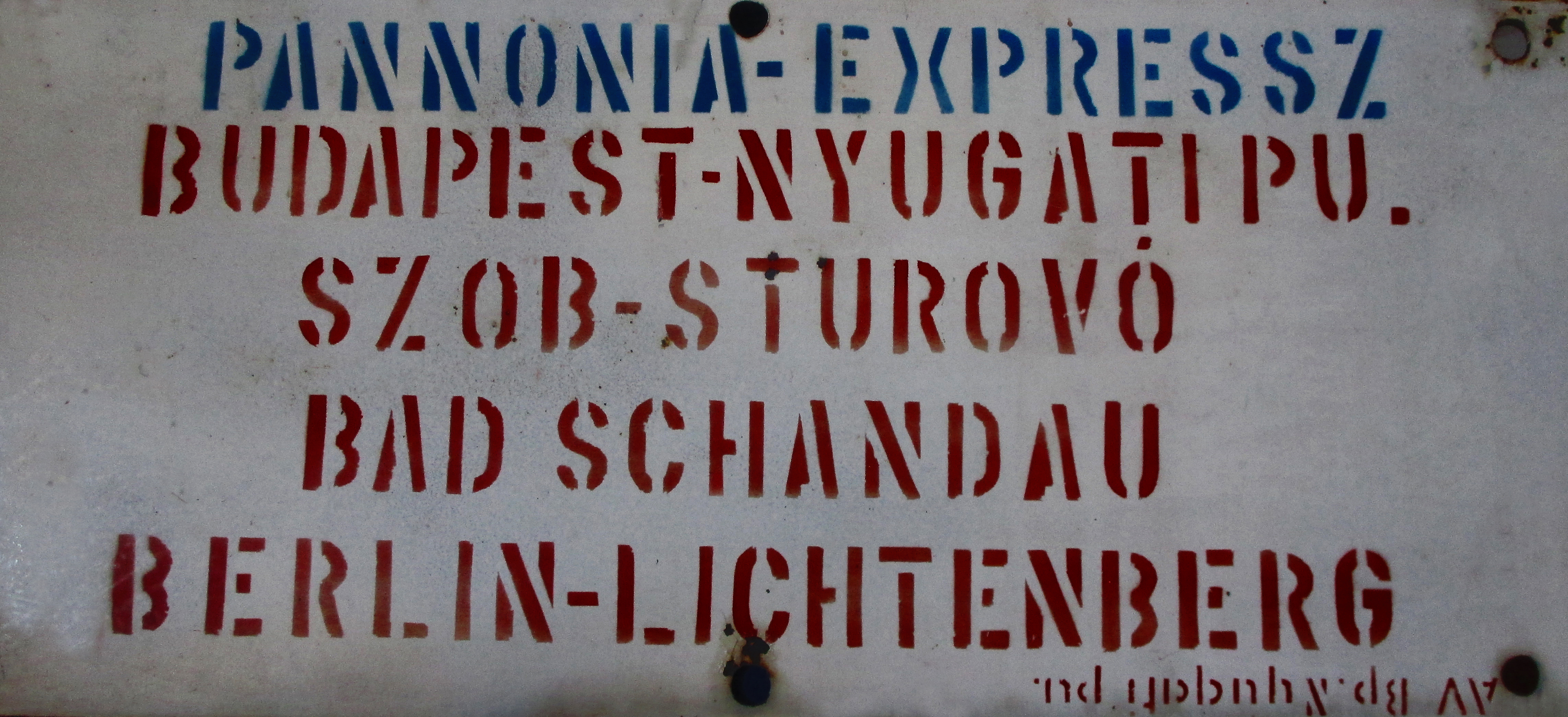
Train destination sign - Pannonia Express - Budapest - Bad Schandau - Berlin Lichtenberg

The Pannonia Express (numbers 375-374) was a long-distance InterCity passenger train that ran every day from Budapest to Bucharest, stopping at Szolnok, Békéscsaba, Lőkösháza, Curtici, Arad, Deva, Alba Iulia, Mediaş, Sighişoara, Braşov, Predeal, Ploieşti and other smaller towns.

In 2009, it consisted of first and second class coaches and a restaurant car of CFR. Sometimes there is a MÁV restaurant car instead. There was also a through sleeping car from Prague to Bucharest, which is carried by "Amicus" train (471-470) from Prague to Břeclav and by "Metropol" EuroNight train between Břeclav and Budapest (477-476)

The through coaches from Munich to Bucharest (a sleeping car and a couchette car) are carried between Munich and Budapest by "Kálmán Imre" EuroNight train (463-462).

In summer, the Pannonia train carries between Lőkösháza and Bucharest through coaches from Kraków to Bucharest, they consist of second class coaches and a couchette car. Between Kraków and Lőkösháza these carriages are coupled to the "Cracovia" express train (1381-1380). In summer, there are between Budapest and Lőkösháza also through coaches (couchette and sleeping cars) from Prague and Bratislava to Varna or Burgas which are carried by "Amicus" express train (471-470) from Prague or Bratislava to Budapest. Between Lőkösháza and Rousse and between Rousse and Varna or Burgas they are carried by nameless express trains.

There is another express train called Panonija (numbers 437-436) going from Subotica in Serbia to Bar in Montenegro, which stops in Novi Sad, Novi Beograd, Prijepolje and Podgorica. It consists of ŽS and ŽCG second class coaches, couchette and sleeping cars. In summer, it has through couchette cars from Prague or Bratislava or through sleeping cars from Moscow or Kiev to Bar.
