= Ústí nad Labem hlavní nádraží =

Railway station in Ústí nad Labem, Czech Republic

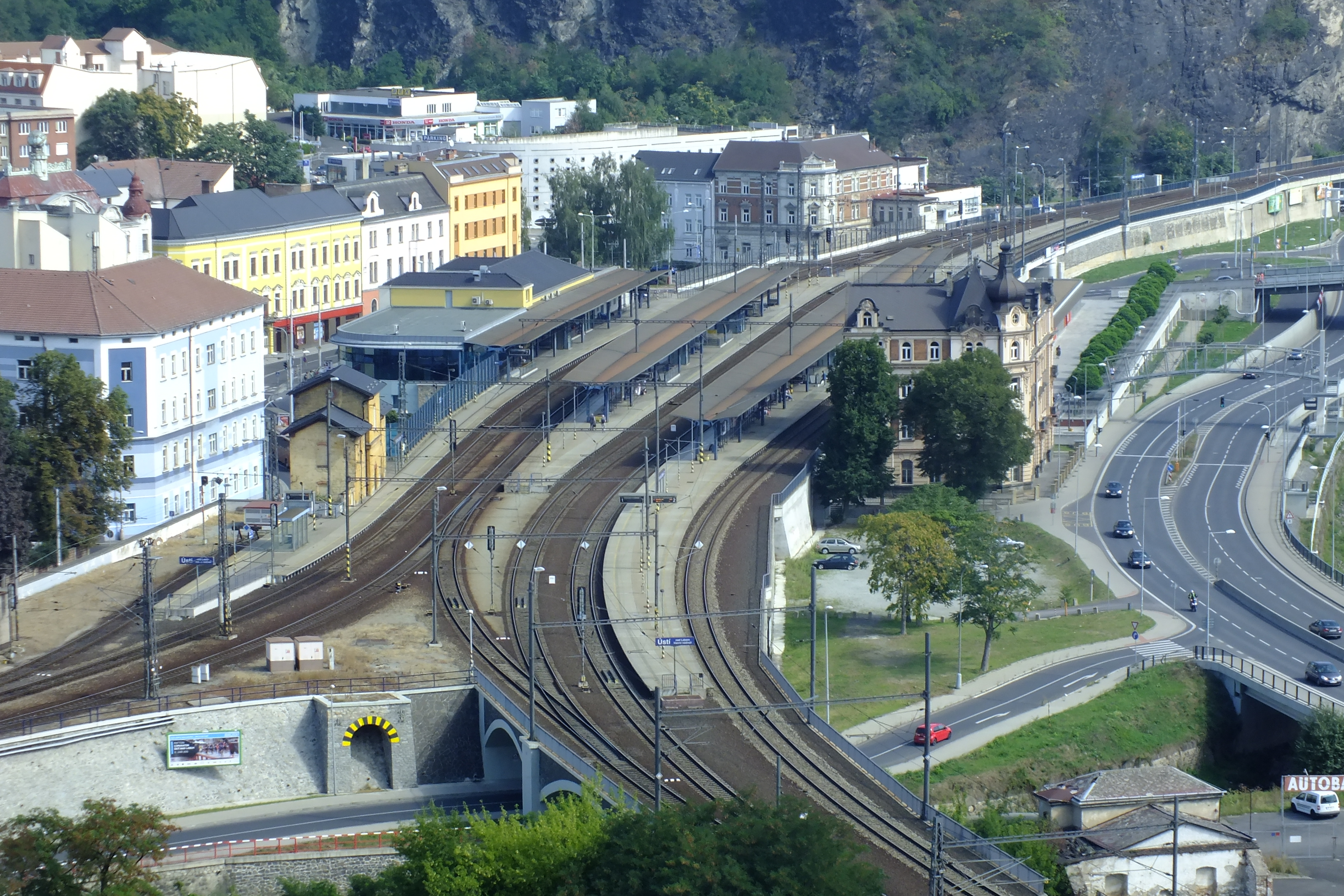
- View from the southwest

General information
- Other names: Ústí nad Labem main railway station
- Location: Ústí nad Labem, Ústí nad Labem Region; Czech Republic
- Coordinates: 50°39′33″N 14°2′40″E
- Owner: Czech Republic
- Operator: Správa železnic
- Lines: Praha–Ústí nad Labem–Děčín railway (090); Ústí nad Labem–Chomutov railway (130); Ústí nad Labem–Bílina railway (131)
- Platforms: 5
- Tracks: 5

Other information
- Station code: 54531798
- Website: https://www.cd.cz/stanice/5453179

History
- Opened: 1850; 176 years ago

Services
Preceding station	EuroCity	Following station
Děčín hl.n. towards Hamburg-Altona	EuroCity	Praha-Holešovice towards Prague
Preceding station	České dráhy	Following station
Děčín hl.n. towards Hamburg-Altona, Kiel Hbf or København H	Railjet	Praha-Holešovice towards Praha hl.n.
Location
- Location within Czech Republic

Ústí nad Labem hlavní nádraží ('Ústí nad Labem main railway station') is a railway station in Ústí nad Labem in the Ústí nad Labem Region of the Czech Republic. The station opened in 1850 and is located on the Praha–Ústí nad Labem–Děčín railway, Ústí nad Labem–Chomutov railway and Ústí nad Labem–Bílina railway. The train services are operated by České dráhy.
