= Děčín–Dresden-Neustadt railway =

Railway line in the Czech Republic and Germany

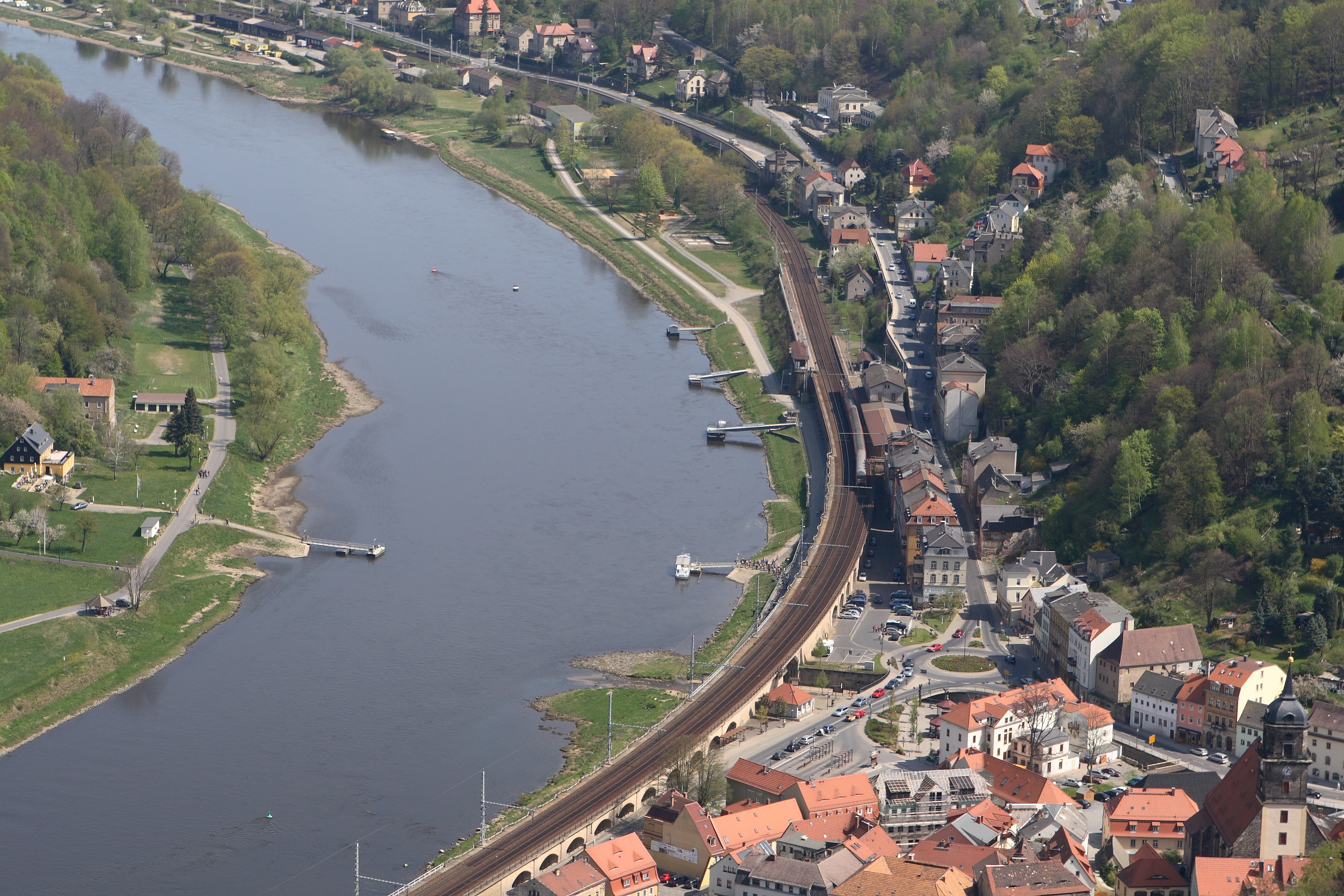
- Aerial view at Königstein station

Overview
- Line number: 544^{Správa železnic} 6240^{de:DB InfraGO}
- Locale: Czech Republic and Germany
- Termini: Děčín main railway station; Dresden-Neustadt

Service
- Route number: Germany: 241.1, 241.2, 241.4; Czech Republic: 098

Technical
- Line length: 65.785 km (40.877 mi)
- Track gauge: 1,435 mm (4 ft 8 1/2 in) standard gauge
- Minimum radius: 300 m (984 ft)
- Electrification: 15 kV/16.7 Hz AC overhead catenary (Dresden–national border:); 3 kV DC overhead catenary (national border–Děčín:)
- Operating speed: 160 km/h (100 mph)
- Maximum incline: 1%
Route map
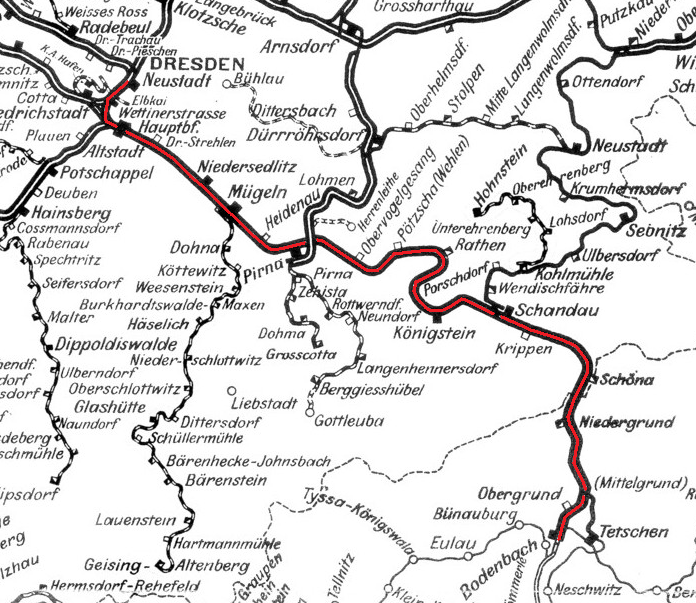
- • station since 2001/2002 on the parallel Pirna–Coswig railway Source: German railway atlas

The Děčín–Dresden railway, also called the Elbe Valley Railway (German: Elbtalbahn) is an electrified main line in Saxony and the Czech Republic. Formerly called the Saxon-Bohemian State Railway (Sächsisch-Böhmische Staatseisenbahn), the line is part of the Dresden to Prague route and is one of Europe's most important trunk routes (Magistralen). It runs along the Elbe Valley from Děčín via Bad Schandau and Pirna to Dresden. The first section of the line was opened in 1848 and is one of the oldest lines in Germany.

== Importance ==
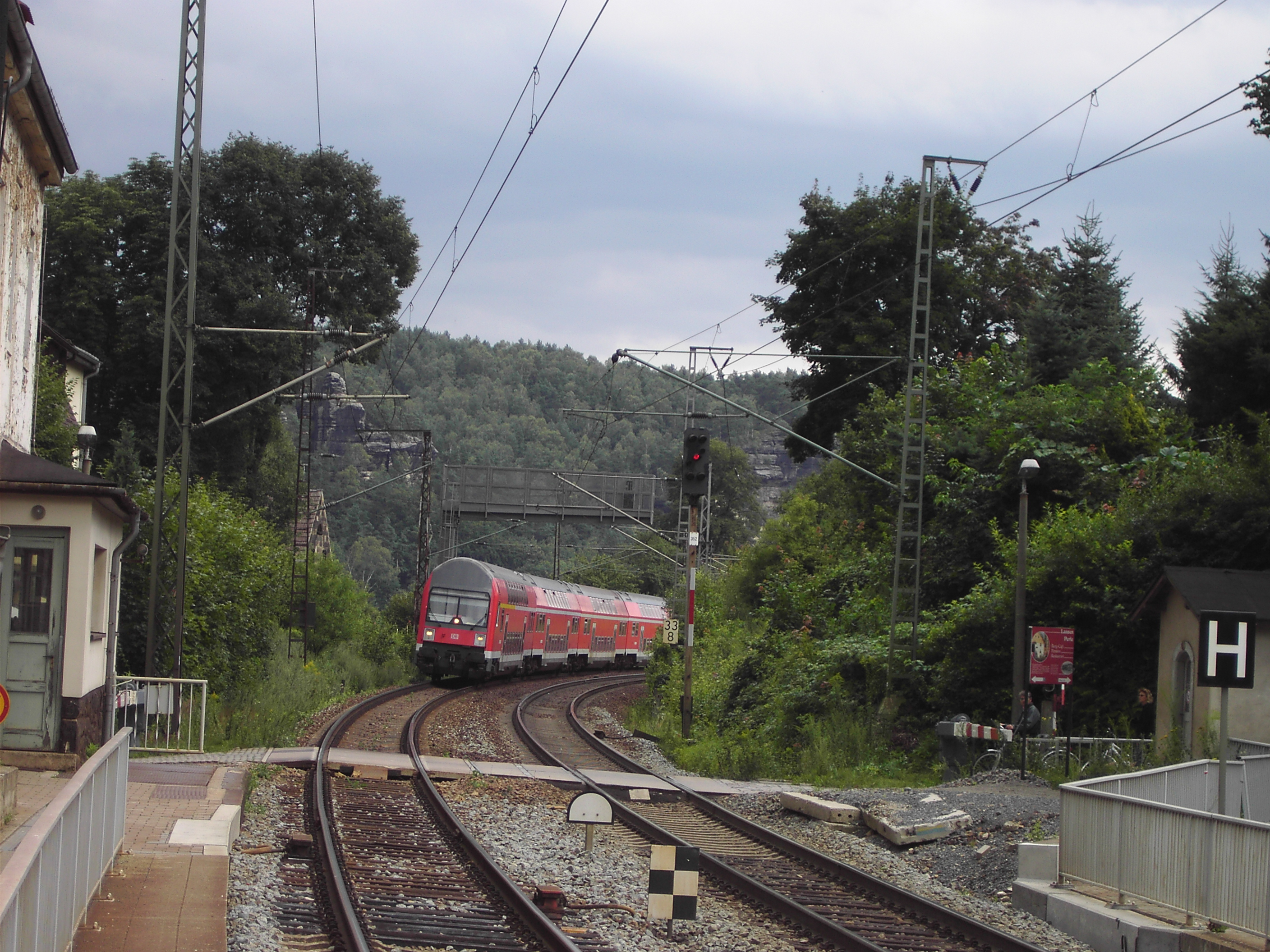
Double-decker S-Bahn train approaching the spa town of Rathen

The Děčín–Dresden line is part of line 22 of the Trans-European Transport Networks (TEN-T; Athens–Sofia–Budapest–Vienna–Prague–Nuremberg/Dresden) and received €11 million in 2000 to 2006 from the European Regional Development Fund. The line is also the most northern section of Pan-European railway corridor IV connecting Dresden and Istanbul. The track is the only electrified line that directly connects Germany with the Czech Republic. It is a key part of the freight line between Scandinavia and Southern Europe. The line is the fastest link from the Czech Republic to the North Sea ports and as such very busy with freight.

Direct EuroCity trains on the Elbe Valley line connect Berlin with Prague and Budapest. The Schöna–Dresden section of the line is part of the Dresden S-Bahn network.

== History ==
=== History and construction ===
Shortly after the completion of the Leipzig–Dresden railway in 1839, the first plans were developed to continue the route south towards Vienna. The first proposal considered was for a line via Zittau and Liberec through Upper Lusatia. High costs and the danger that Saxony could be bypassed by such a route led to this project being dropped. Later the German South-North Connecting Railway (Südnorddeutsche Verbindungsbahn) was built on this route. Austria preferred, however, from the start a line through the Elbe valley. Saxony and Austria agreed to this in a treaty signed on 9 August 1842, which provided for a construction time of eight years.

On 1 August 1848, the first section of Dresden was opened to Pirna. The first service over the whole Dresden–Děčín line ran on 6 April 1851. Royal Saxon State Railways owned the section to the border only. The rest of the line to Děčín was leased from Austria.

In the following years, as part of the Saxon-Bohemian State Railway, it became an important line in Europe. Much of the north–south traffic connected with the Prussian lines in Upper Silesia.

=== Royal Saxon State Railways ===
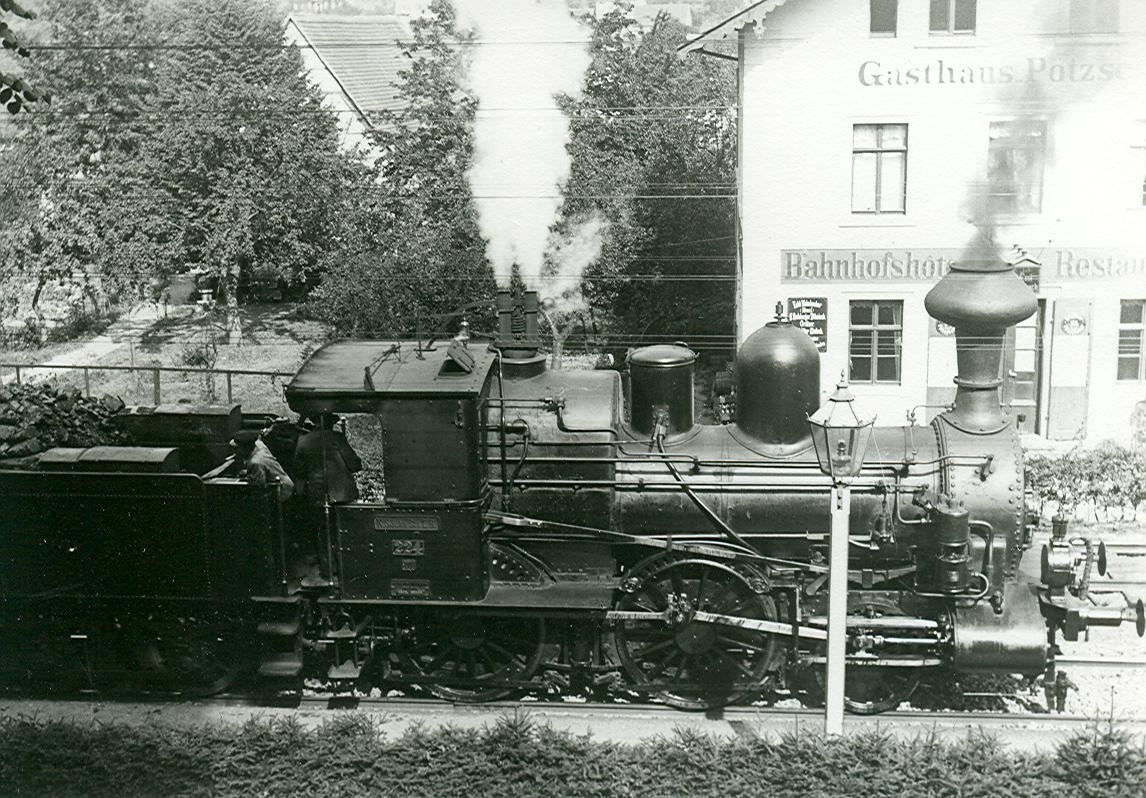
A Saxon IIIb in Pötzscha (now Stadt Wehlen)

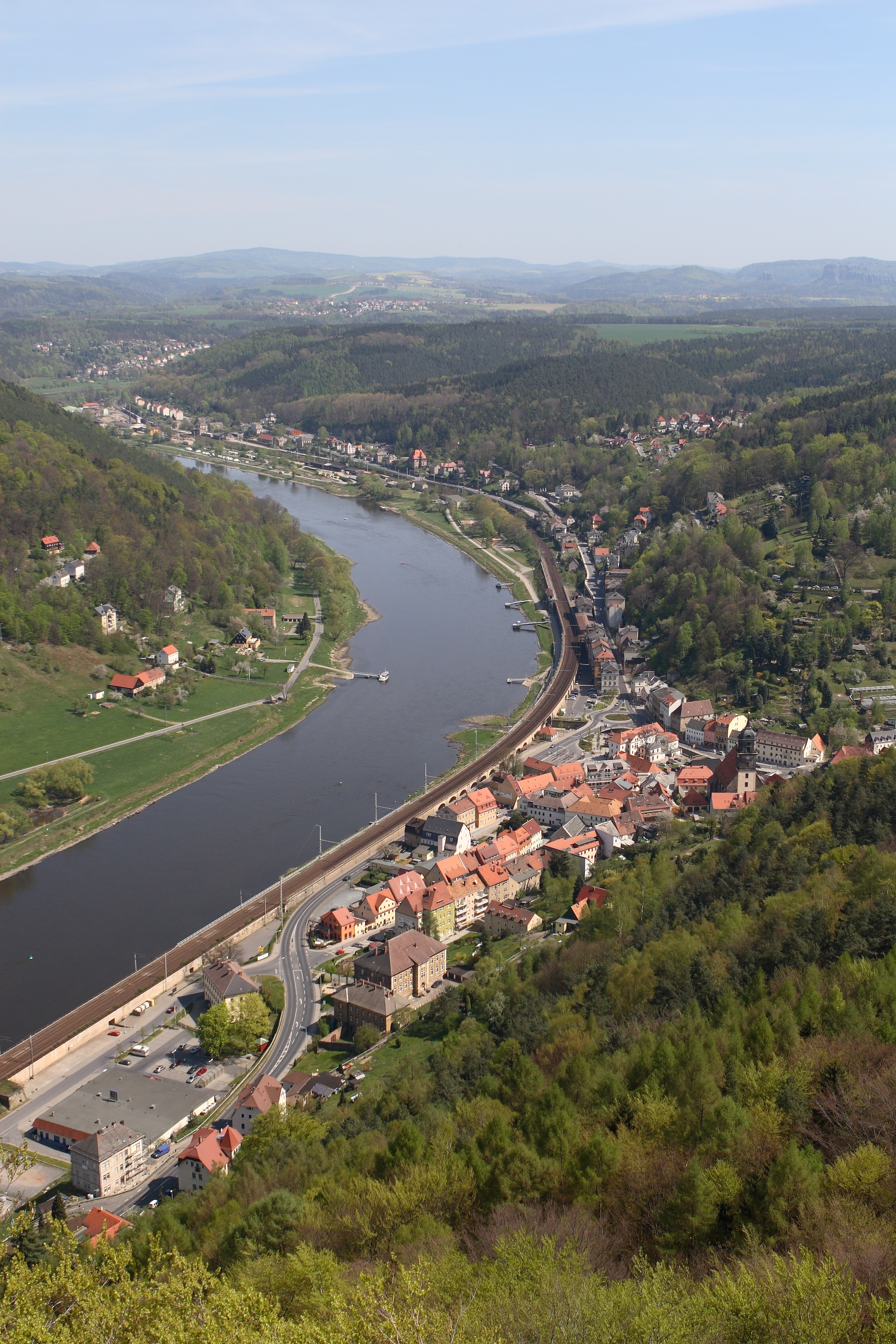
The line below Königstein Fortress

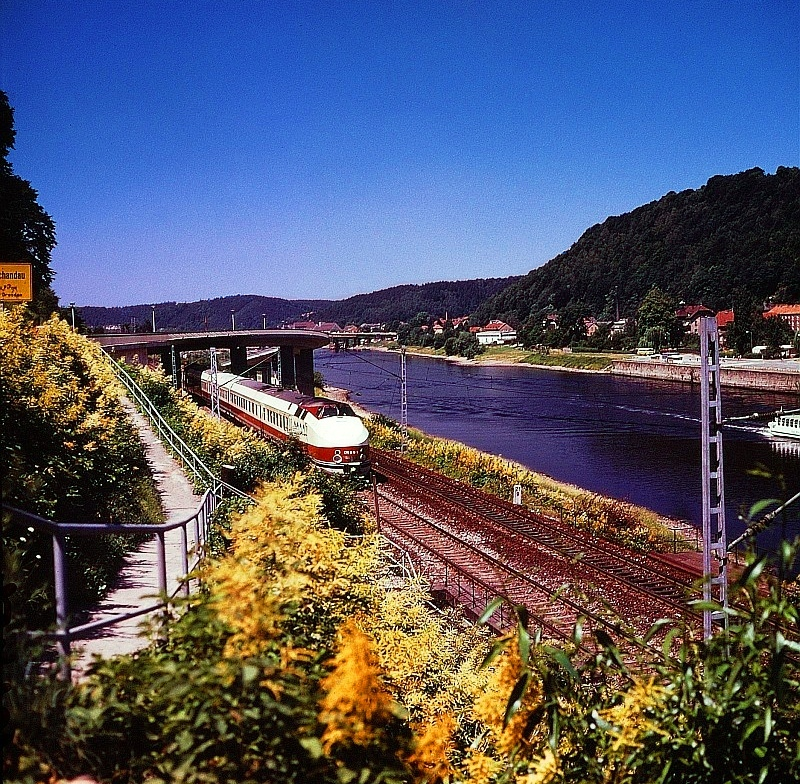
Vindobona Express service, comprising high-speed class VT 18.16 DMU, in the late 1970s

In 1898 large parts of the railway's premises in Dresden were refurbished. The line's old Bohemian station (Böhmische Bahnhof) was demolished and in its place the new Dresden Hauptbahnhof was built. The ground-level route through the city of Dresden was raised to a higher level, allowing a number of level crossings to be removed. Section by section, the Dresden–Pirna line was expanded to four tracks in 1915, allowing a separation of long-distance and regional services. Suburban trains ran every 15 minutes between Dresden and Pirna.

=== After the Second World War ===
After the end of World War II on 8 May 1945, the portion of the state border to Děčín was taken over by the Czechoslovak State Railways (CSD). All passenger trains from Dresden now terminated at Schöna station before the national border. CSD served its own section of the line from then on with passenger trains from Děčín to Dolní Žleb.

On 20 May 1945 German and Czech railway workers were advised that rail operations would resume across the re-established border. However, at first only freight trains operated, with a service between Berlin and Prague starting in 1946. Large parts of the German railway tracks were dismantled in the course of 1946, as reparations to the Soviet Union. As a result, the Dresden–Schöna section was reduced to a single track throughout.

=== Rehabilitation and reconstruction ===
Between 1949 and 1951, the second track was rebuilt. At the end of the 1950s double-decker commuter trains were introduced to the route. Gradually, high-quality long-distance trains returned to the through route. From the late 1950s, an international express service, called Vindobona ran on the line between Berlin and Vienna. Other services on the line included the [Hungaria (Berlin–Budapest) and the Pannonia Express (Berlin-Sofia). Freight traffic also increased steadily.

Visa-free travel between East Germany and Czechoslovakia was introduced on 1 January 1972. On 29 January 1972, a passenger train pair ran between Dresden and Děčín for the first time since 1945. At the same time an express service was introduced to Prague which allowed day trippers to visit the Czech capital of Prague.

From 1973 the line from Dresden to Pirna was integrated into the new S-Bahn tariff zone. In subsequent years, the Dresden–Pirna line was restored as a four-track line in preparation for the conversion of Dresden suburban services into a real S-Bahn.

=== Electrification ===
In the early 1970s, the Dresden-Schöna section was electrified. The electric train service began on 29 May 1976. In 1987, electric overhead line was installed on the section of the line within Czechoslovakia between Děčín hl. n. (Bodenbach) and Děčín vychod (Tetschen). Nevertheless, scheduled electric trains did not begin operating across the border until 1992. The problem was the different electrical systems in use. The German section is electrified at the German standard of 15 kV AC at 16.7 Hz. In the north of the Czech Republic, lines are electrified with the 3000-volt DC system. In order to operate the route continuously using electrical traction, a dual-system locomotive (class 180) was developed. 50 m of the contact wire between Schöna and Dolní Žleb carries no current. In this section of the line the driver lowers the pantograph and coasts through the neutral section while changing the locomotive's electrical setting. Afterwards, the pantograph is raised again.

Until 1990, suburban trains operated to Schöna at approximate 60-minute intervals, starting in the late 1980s on the service from Meissen-Triebischtal.

=== Since 1990 ===
The political changes in the former Communist countries in South-Eastern Europe in 1990 led to a sharp decline in traffic on the line. From the mid-1990s, the remaining long-distance passenger services were converted to EuroCity services. As an alternative to the congested B 170 highway via Zinnwald, a rolling highway rail service was introduced in 1994 between Dresden and Lovosice.

On 7 June 1995 Germany, the Czech Republic and Austria signed an agreement to upgrade the line between Dresden, Prague and Vienna. In order to implement this agreement, two new intercity rail tracks were built between Dresden and Pirna, designed for 160 km/h operations. Parallel to the mainline tracks, separate S-Bahn tracks have been built between Pirna and Dresden-Neustadt for the Pirna–Coswig S-Bahn route. The new mainline and S-Bahn services began operations on 12 December 2004.

Since the late 1990s, freight services have returned to the line, but the high utilisation of the 1980s has not yet been reached. After the European Union enlargement of 1 May 2004, utilisation of the rolling highway service decreased sharply and the service was closed. The completion of the A 17 autobahn and D8 motorway as part of a European corridor has favoured road transport.

In August 2002, the line in the Elbe Valley was severely affected by the 2002 European floods. Because of flood damage to the track, it was completely closed in October 2002. All freight traffic was diverted via Ebersbach and via Bad Brambach. Long-distance passenger traffic was stopped completely.

Seasonal long-distance trains and regular Regional-Express trains run on the Elbe Valley line. In the winter sports season trains run on the line to the Müglitz Valley Railway and Altenberg. A weekend excursion train (RE 20, Bohemica) has from Dresden to Děčín since 2004, during the summer months.

Since the timetable change in May 1999, there are also several daily connections with the regional trains of České dráhy that run between Bad Schandau and Děčín, operating as Elbe-Labe-Sprinter. Since 15 June 2008 these trains run seven times a day at two-hourly intervals. This is the first time since 1945 that there has been a regular cross-border local passenger service stopping at all intermediate stations. Since 3 April 2010, the Wanderexpress Bohemica Express has operated via Děčín to Litoměřice. This train is a class 642 diesel multiple unit.

== Future ==
The European Union has identified this rail section as Corridor 5 of the Trans-European Transport Network. This line will the superseded by a 42 km (26.1 miles), Dresden-Prague high speed rail line as a part of the Trans-European high-speed rail network. The line would have a maximum speed of 200 km/h (124.3 mph) and reduce travel time along the corridor. In 2017, the Government of the Czech Republic approved a high-speed rail development program. The Ministry of Transport of the Czech Republic, designated in a document, the Dresden-Prague corridor as RS4.
