= Děčín hlavní nádraží =

Railway station in Děčín, Czech Republic

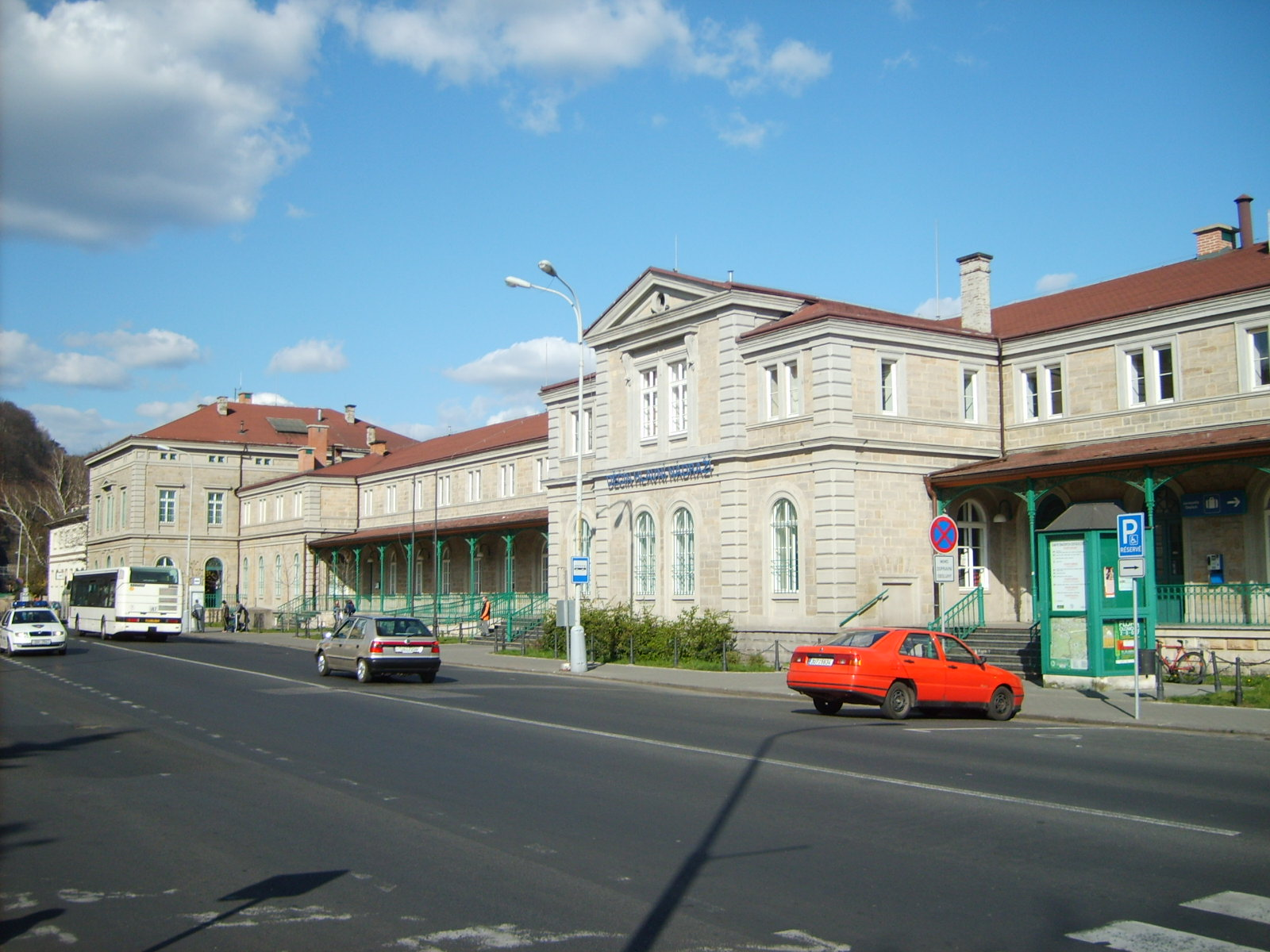
- Děčín main railway station

General information
- Location: Děčín, Ústí nad Labem Region; Czech Republic
- Coordinates: 50°46′22″N 14°12′05″E
- Owner: Czech Republic
- Operator: Správa železnic
- Lines: Ústí nad Labem – Děčín railway (073); Děčín–Benešov nad Ploučnicí–Rumburk railway (081); Praha–Ústí nad Labem–Děčín railway (090); Děčín–Dresden-Neustadt railway (083); Děčín–Oldřichov u Duchcova railway (formerly 132)
- Platforms: 7

Other information
- Station code: 54556597

History
- Opened: 1850; 176 years ago

Services
Preceding station	EuroCity	Following station
Bad Schandau towards Hamburg-Altona, Flensburg, Kiel Hbf or Berlin Hbf	EuroCity Berliner	Ústí nad Labem main towards Prague
Bad Schandau towards Zürich HB	EuroCity	Ústí nad Labem main towards Prague
Bad Schandau towards Hamburg-Altona	EuroCity	Ústí nad Labem main towards Budapest Nyugati
Preceding station	České dráhy	Following station
Bad Schandau towards Hamburg-Altona, Kiel Hbf or København H	Railjet	Ústí nad Labem main towards Praha hl.n.
Vilsnice towards Kadan predmesti	Os	Terminus
Preceding station	European Sleeper	Following station
Bad Schandau towards Brussels-South	Brussels - Prague	Praha hl.n. Terminus
Preceding station	DB Regio Südost	Following station
Děčín-Přípeř towards Rumburk	U 28	Terminus
Location
- Location within Czech Republic

Děčín main station (Czech: Děčín hlavní nádraží) is a railway station in the city of Děčín, in the Ústí nad Labem Region of the Czech Republic. The station originally opened in 1850 and the current building was constructed in 1865. It is located on the Děčín–Benešov nad Ploučnicí–Rumburk railway, Praha–Ústí nad Labem–Děčín railway, Děčín–Dresden-Neustadt railway and Děčín–Oldřichov u Duchcova railway. The train services are operated by Czech Railways (Czech: České dráhy) and other carriers.

From 2001 to 2003, the station was renovated along with the adjacent rail yard.
