= Tharandt =

- Town
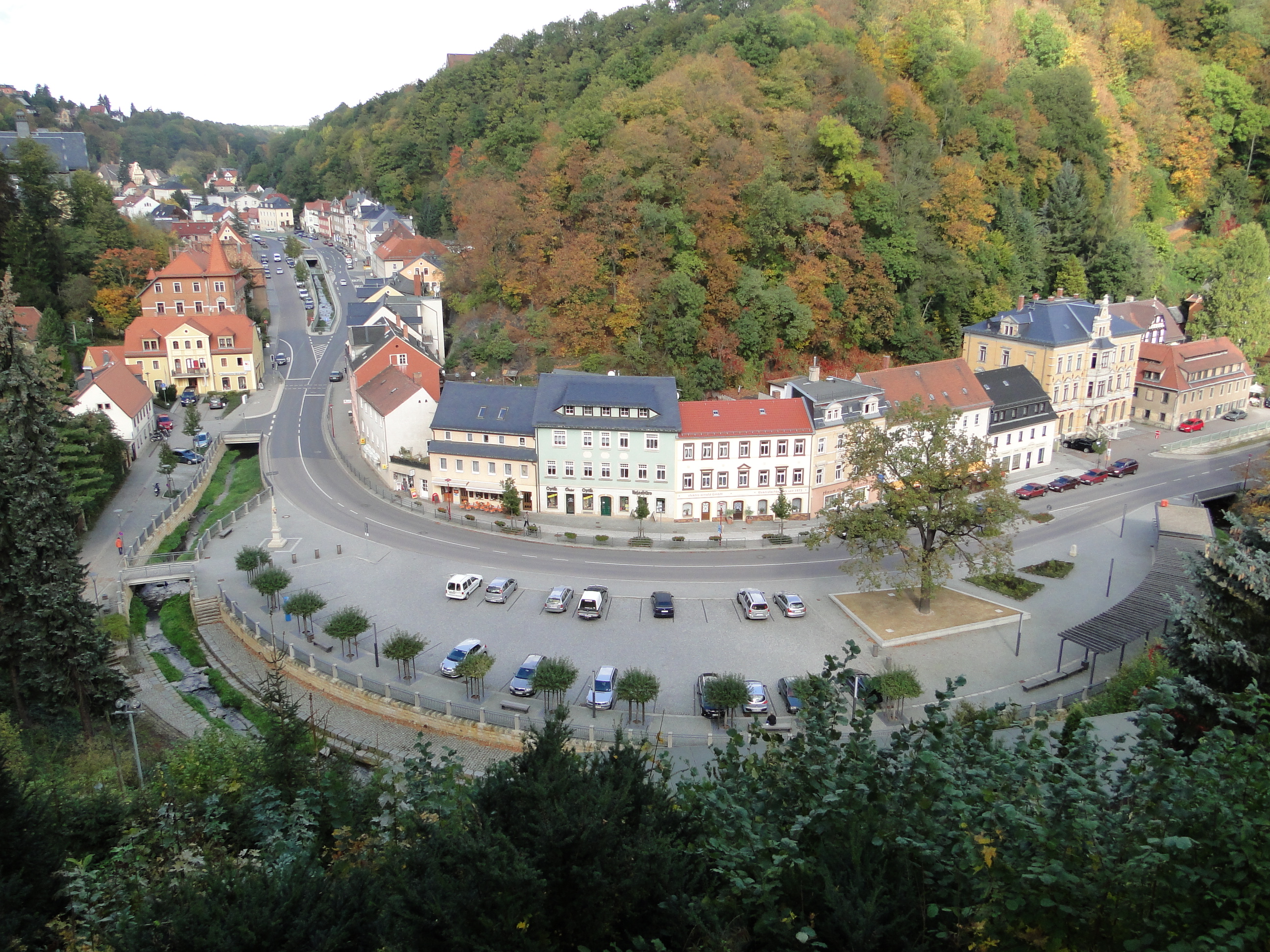

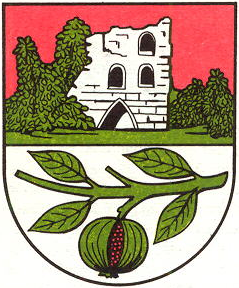
- Coat of arms

- Location of Tharandt within Sächsische Schweiz-Osterzgebirge district
- Interactive map of Tharandt
- Location within Germany Location within Saxony
- Coordinates: 50°59′0″N 13°34′51″E
- Country: Germany
- State: Saxony
- District: Sächsische Schweiz-Osterzgebirge
- Subdivisions: 7

Government
  - Mayor (2020–27): Silvio Ziesemer

Area
  - Total: 71.22 km^{2} (27.50 sq mi)
- Elevation: 214 m (702 ft)

Population (2025-12-31)
  - Total: 5,101
  - Density: 71.62/km^{2} (185.5/sq mi)
- Time zone: UTC+01:00 (CET)
  - Summer (DST): UTC+02:00 (CEST)
- Postal codes: 01737
- Dialling codes: 035203
- Vehicle registration: PIR
- Website: www.tharandt.de

Tharandt (German: [ˈtaʁant]) is a municipality in Saxony, Germany, situated on the Weißeritz, 13 km (8.1 mi) southwest of Dresden.

It has a Protestant Church and the oldest academy of forestry in Germany, founded as the Royal Saxon Academy of Forestry by Heinrich Cotta in 1811, together with its arboretum, the Forstbotanischer Garten Tharandt. In 2002, a severe flood destroyed many of the academy buildings and the library, including some of its more-than-500-year old books. The academy was rebuilt and today has about 650 students and is famous for its long traditions of educating students from all over the world in (tropical) forestry, resource management and sustainable land use.

In the early 20th century, Tharandt was a favorite summer resort of the people of Dresden, one of its principal charms being the beech woods which surround it.

== Personalities connected to the town ==
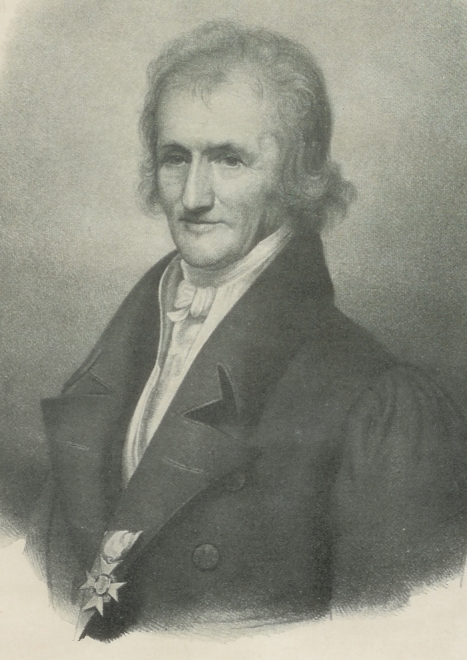
Heinrich Cotta (1833)

- Heinrich Cotta (1763–1844), a forestry scholar, lived in Tharandt since 1811, where he was director of the Royal Saxon Forestry Academy.
- Sidonie of Poděbrady (died 1510 in Tharandt), Duchess of Saxony, wife of the Duke Albrecht the Boldheart
- Johann Wolfgang von Goethe (1749–1832), poet, theater director, naturalist, art theorist, and statesman; he visited Heinrich Cotta several times from 1811
- Friedrich Schiller (1759–1805) was in the town in 1787
- Carsten Egeberg Borchgrevink (1864 – 1934), Anglo-Norwegian polar explorer and a pioneer of modern Antarctic travel, attended the Royal Saxon Forestry Academy (1885–88)

== Transportation ==
The Dresden–Werdau railway passes through the town. The Tharandt station sees regular service on the S3 Line of the Dresden S-Bahn to both Dresden and Freiberg (Sachs) station as well as regional express services to various local and long distance destinations.
