= Klingenberg-Colmnitz station =

Railway station in Klingenberg, Germany

Klingenberg-Colmnitz
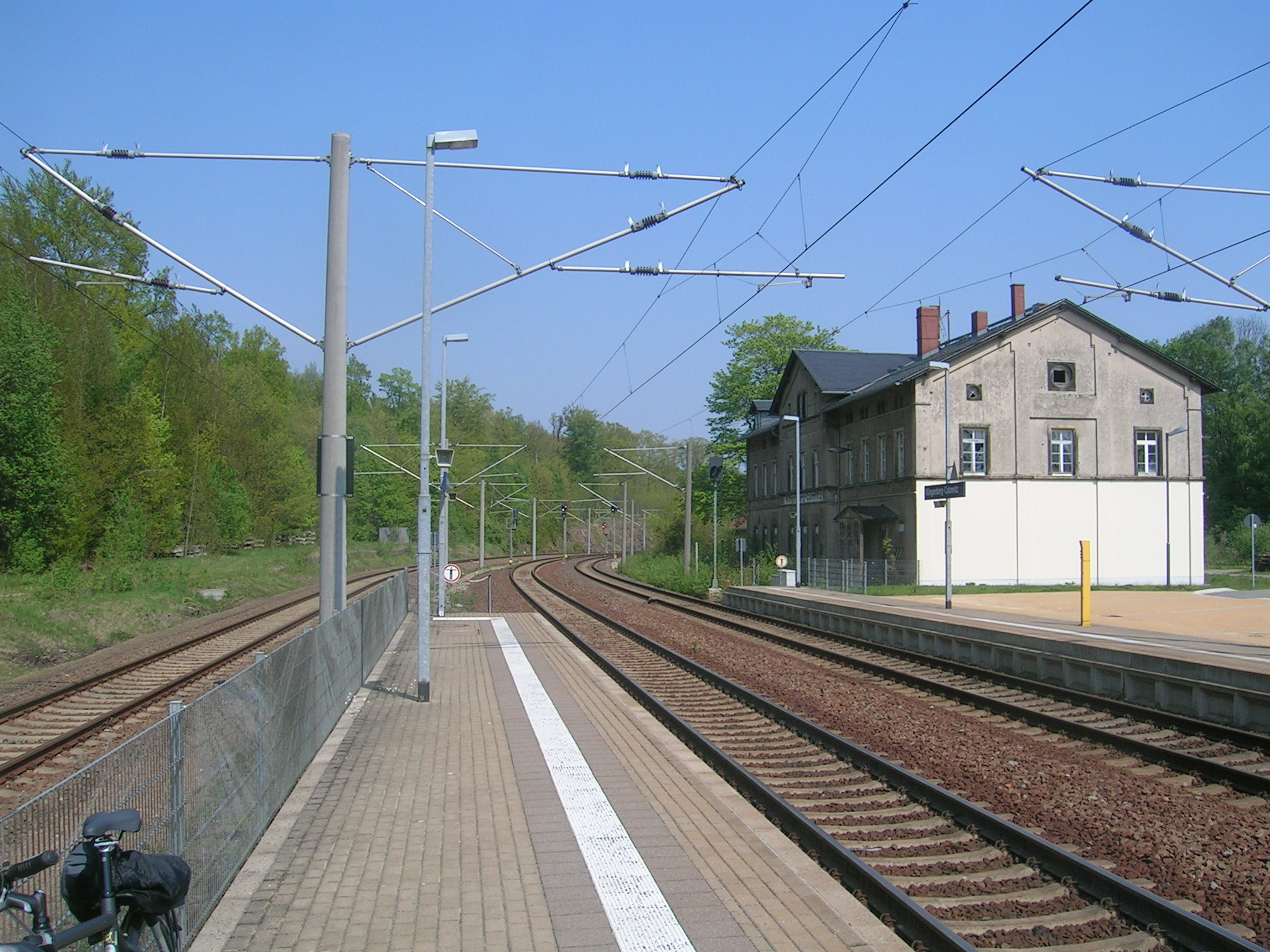
- Standard-gauge entrance building looking towards Dresden

General information
- Location: Bahnhofstr. 12, Klingenberg, Saxony; Germany
- Coordinates: 50°55′33″N 13°30′03″E
- Lines: Dresden–Werdau (km 25.37); Klingenberg–Frauenstein (km 0.0; former); Klingenberg–Oberdittmannsdorf (km 0.0; former)
- Platforms: 2

Construction
- Accessible: Yes

Other information
- Station code: 3271
- DS100 code: DKC
- IBNR: 8012044
- Category: 6
- Website: www.bahnhof.de

History
- Opened: 28 June 1855

Services
Preceding station	Mitteldeutsche Regiobahn	Following station
Niederbobritzsch towards Zwickau Hbf	RB 30	Edle Krone towards Dresden Hbf
Preceding station	Dresden S-Bahn	Following station
Niederbobritzsch towards Freiberg (Sachs)	S 3	Edle Krone towards Dresden Hbf
Location

Klingenberg-Colmnitz station is a station on the Dresden–Werdau railway and the start of two former 750 mm gauge railways, the Klingenberg-Colmnitz–Oberdittmannsdorf and the Klingenberg-Colmnitz–Frauenstein railways, in the municipality of Klingenberg in the German state of Saxony. The station is the top station of the Tharandter Steige ("Tharandt climb").

== History ==
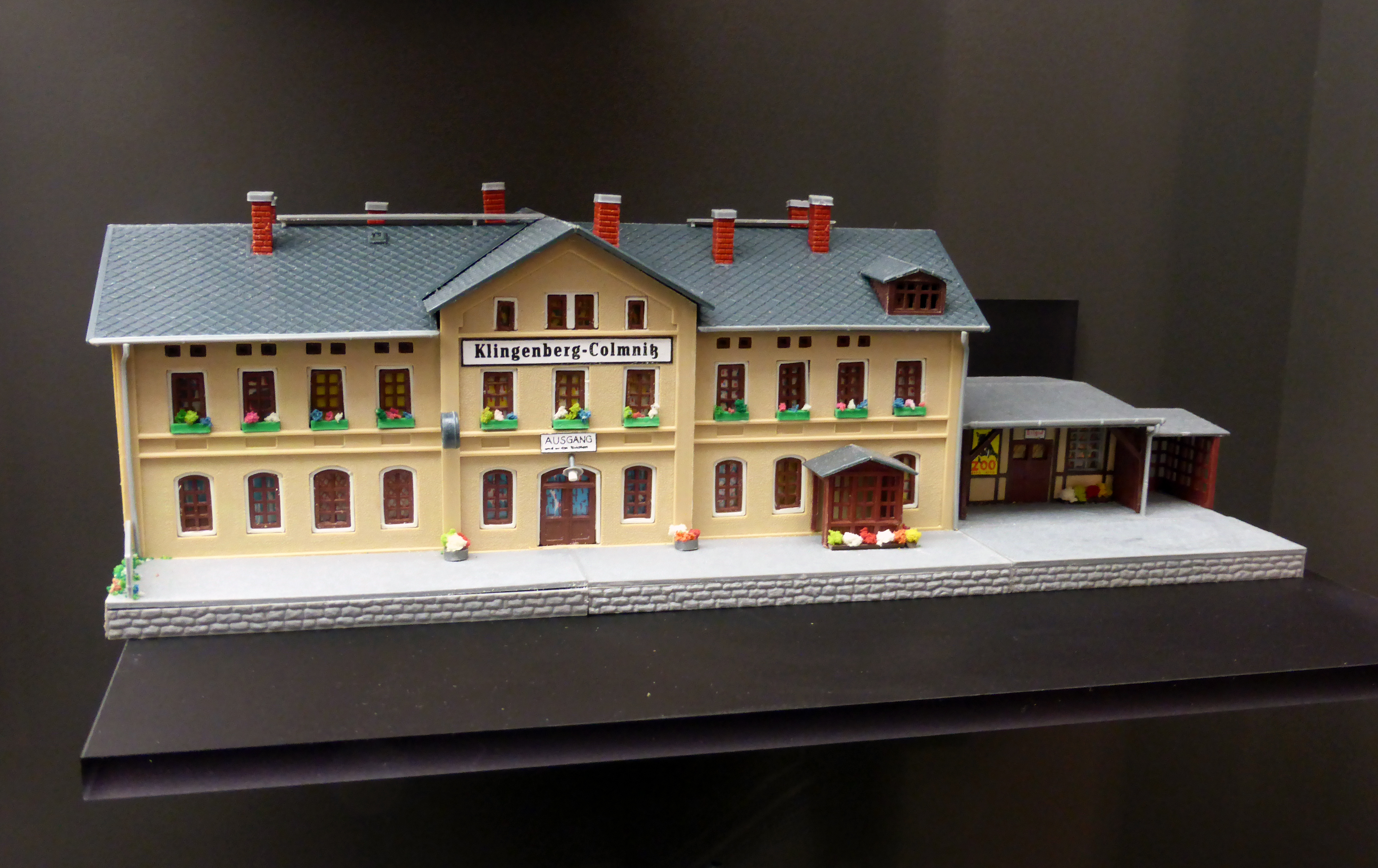
Mamos model building set from about 1970.

The station was built on 11 August 1862 with the opening of the Dresden-Werdau railway. Immediately after the opening, the station at the top of the Tharandter Steige, which was feared by the operators of steam trains, was of great importance, as almost all the trains had to be assisted by bank engines from Tharandt station. Trains had to climb 230 metres of altitude from the valley station on a twelve kilometre-long section.

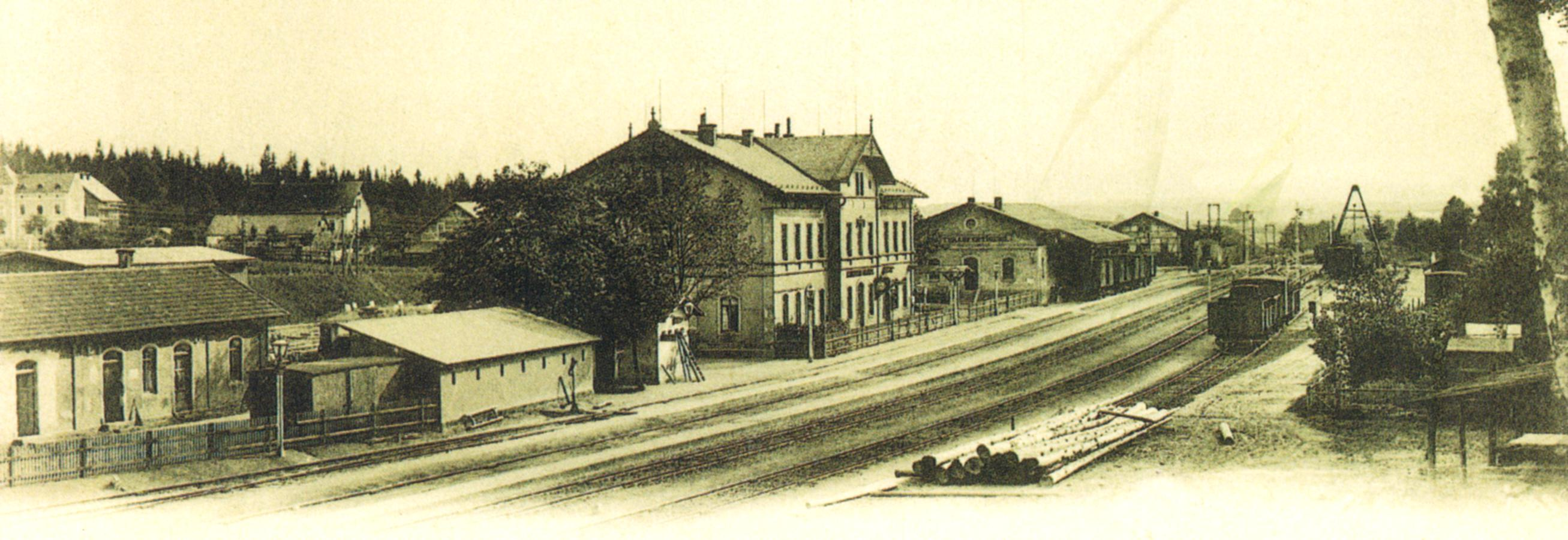
Historic photo of Klingenberg-Colmnitz station in 1898/1899

The station initially had fewer regional connections, but it was important as a point for the detachment of bank engines after the completion of the climb. A photograph of the station shows it with only one platform, but, in another photograph, the same area is visible looking towards Freiberg with two platforms. The freight train tracks look rather modest with a total of five tracks.

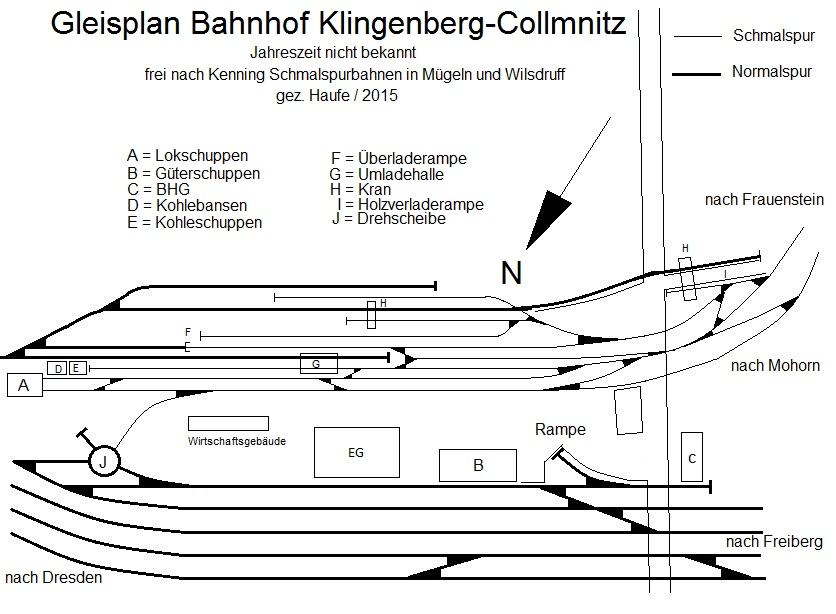
Track plan of Klingenberg-Colmnitz station from the time of the narrow-gauge railway

This changed on 14 September 1898 with the opening of the Klingenberg-Colmnitz–Frauenstein narrow-gauge railway, which was supplemented by the Klingenberg-Colmnitz–Oberdittmannsdorf narrow-gauge railway in 1923. The station precinct was now larger as they can be seen on the depicted track plan. Until the beginning of the 1970s, the railway lines remained in this form. For the exchange of goods, there was only one transhipment hall and two loading cranes, one in the station forecourt and one at the exit of the narrow-gauge railway towards Frauenstein and towards Oberdittmannsdorf. Rollbock devices and transporter wagons were never used on the Klingenberg-Colmnitz–Frauenstein railway and transporter wagons were used only as far as Naundorf on the railway to Oberdittmannsdorf. In addition, a shed with two tracks, each capable of holding two locomotives, a coal shed and a coal store were built in the narrow-gauge section of the station. This locomotive depot had already been built by the opening of the line to Frauenstein. This meant that the track layout of the station was essentially complete.

It was not until 1927 that the two signal boxes W1 and B2 were built to take control of the standard gauge section north of the station building. Around 1930, here was a facility for turning locomotives to the east of the station's workshops. The turntable had three rails and could be used to turn narrow-gauge locomotives.

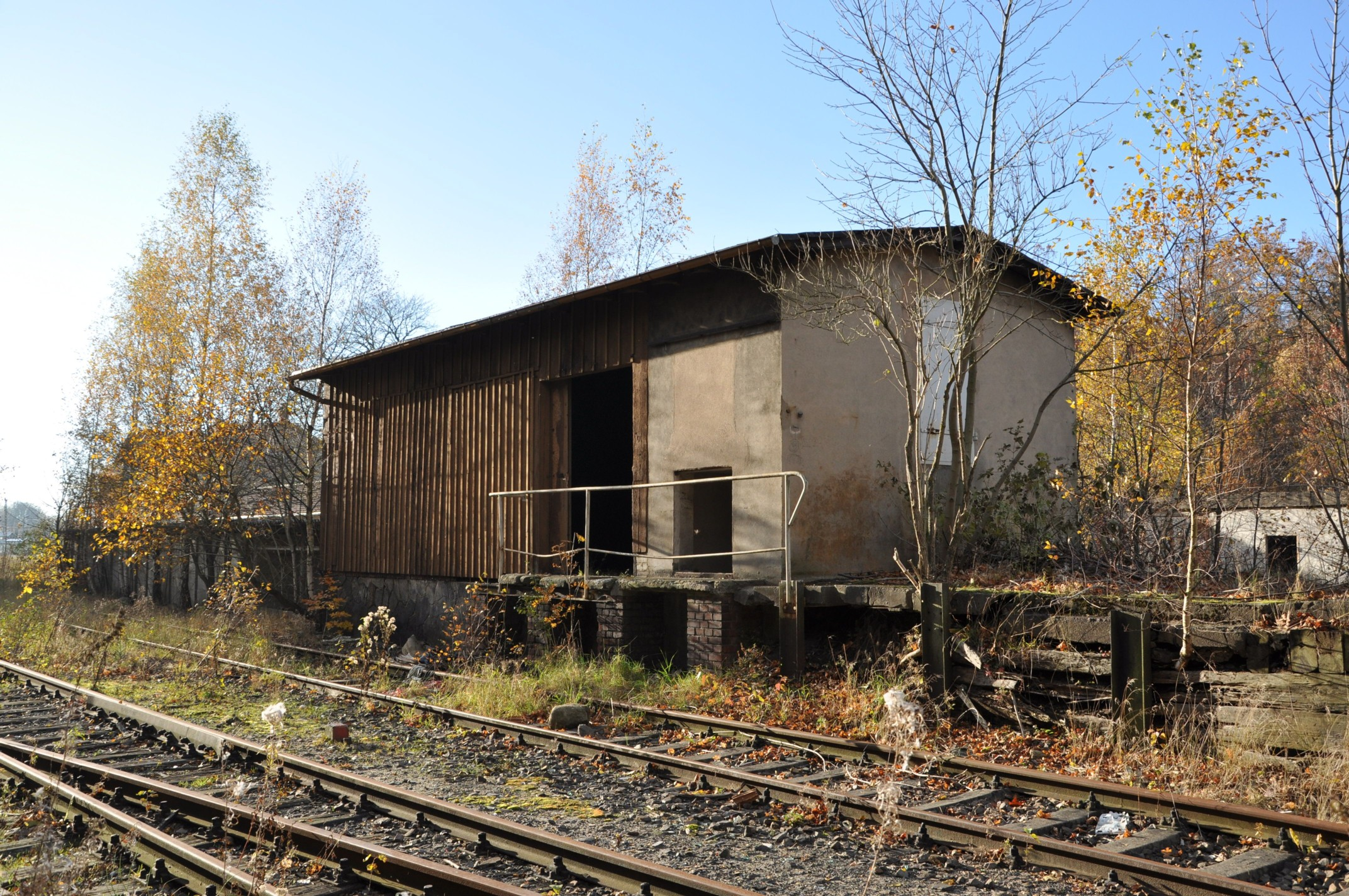
The still existing coal sheds of the narrow-gauge line of Klingenberg-Colmnitz station in 2010

The standard-gauge tracks were electrified on 25 September 1966. When the two narrow-gauge lines were closed in 1972, the narrow-gauge tracks were removed at Klingenberg-Colmnitz station, but the standard-gauge tracks remained essentially the same. Instead of the possibility of transferring it to a narrow-gauge line, one crane was transferred to a steel construction company and the other was dismantled. The remaining buildings from the narrow-gauge railways were a loading hall and the stand for a transfer crane. The four tracks in the narrow-gauge area were used for dispatching wagons. In 2000, the station was connected to an electronic interlocking. This was the occasion for thoroughly modernising the station to meet modern requirements. The station forecourt was converted into a combined bus station and car park. Since then, the station has been operated with three through tracks; two tracks are adjacent to the entrance building, including one with an outside platform, and there is also a northern overtaking track. An underpass with a lift (which is a little small) was built between the two outside platforms. The connection to track 7 is still preserved, as is the standard-gauge track on the former narrow-gauge side of the station. It is no longer usable. In 2009, the freight shed was demolished. The abandoned signal boxes have now been demolished. A functional relic from the narrow-gauge era is the coal shed, which can still be seen in photos in 2011.

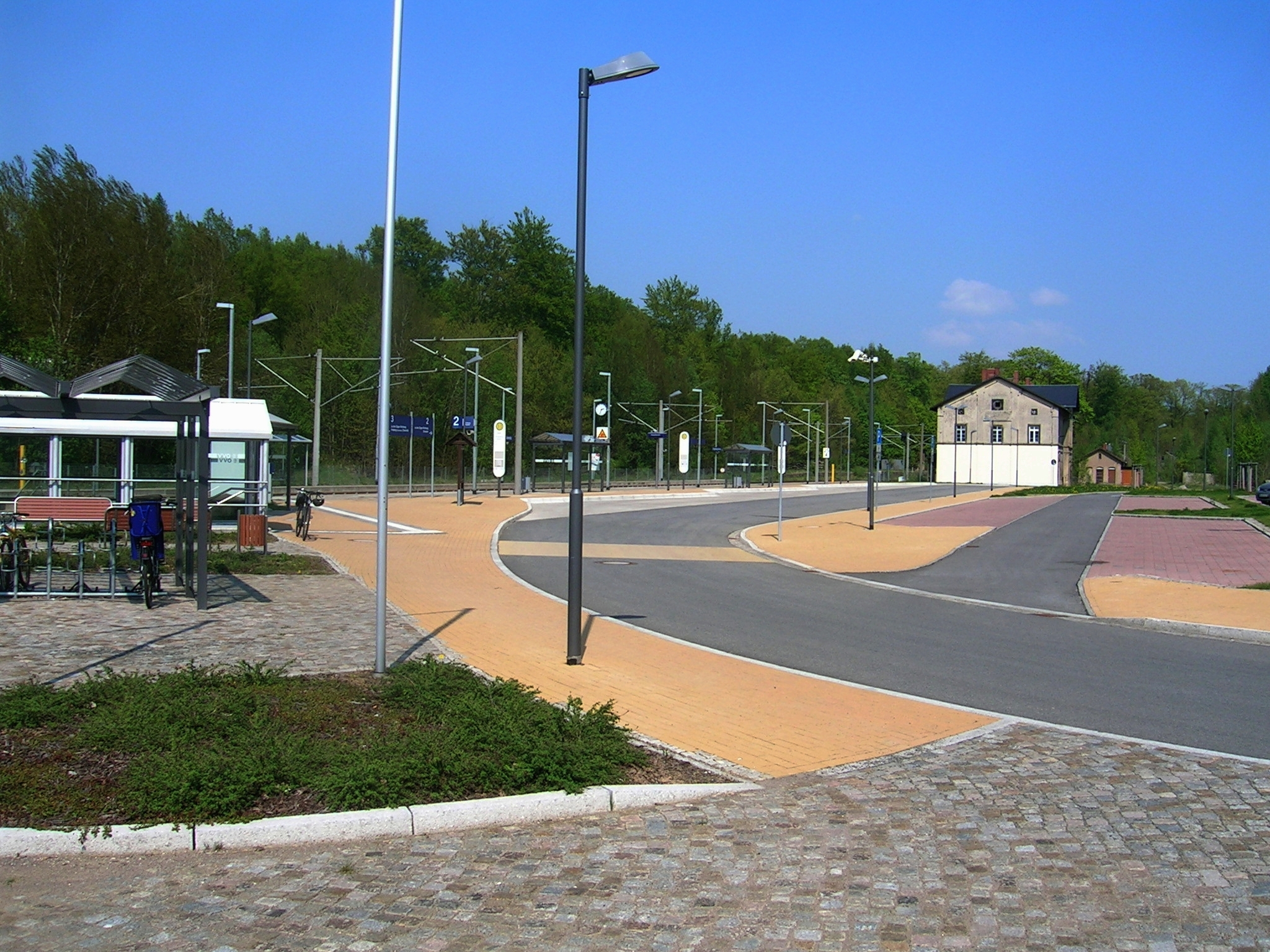
The forecourt of the station on the narrow-gauge side with the recognisable coal shed in the background

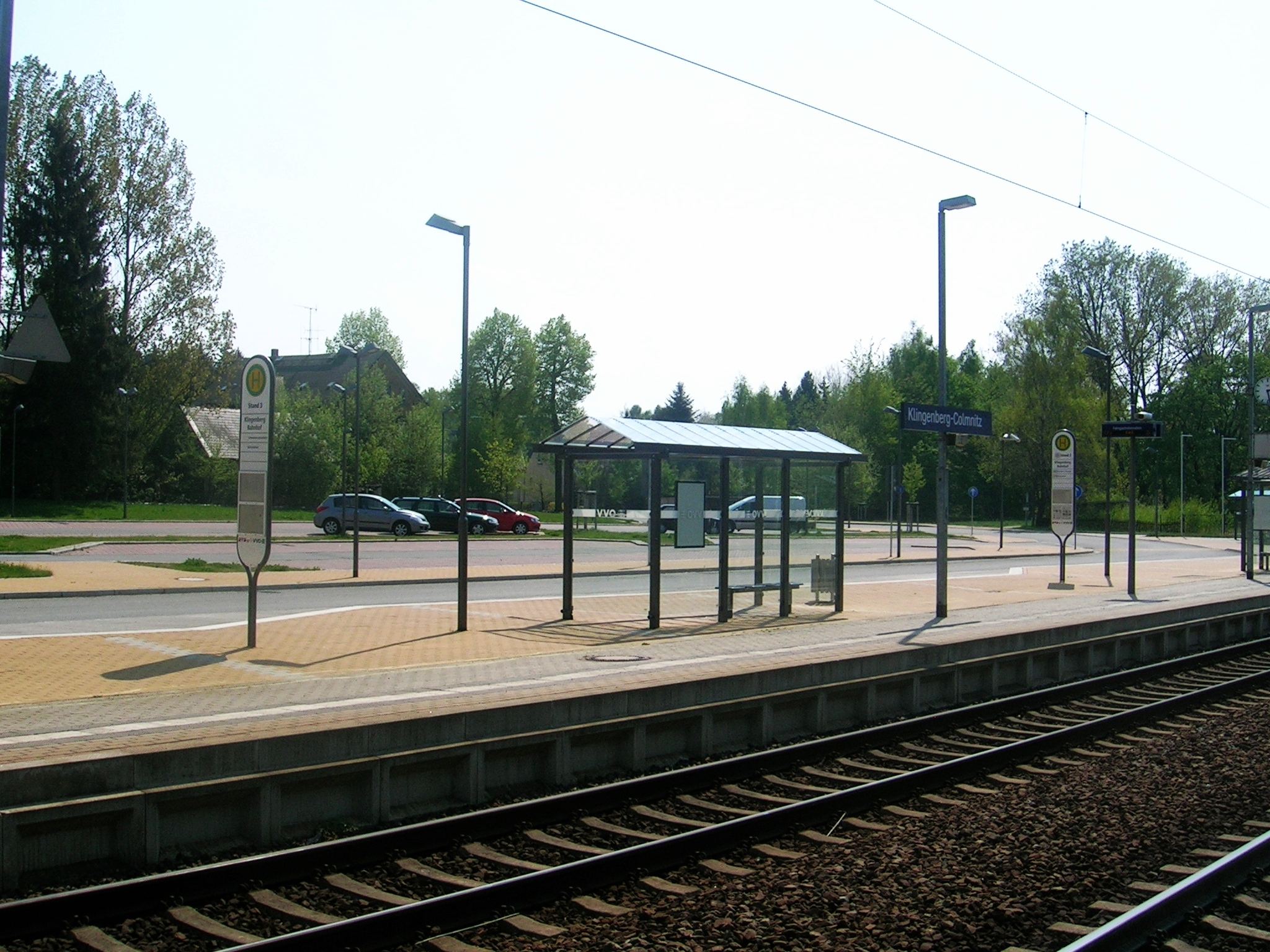
The forecourt of the station overlooks the site of the former freight shed

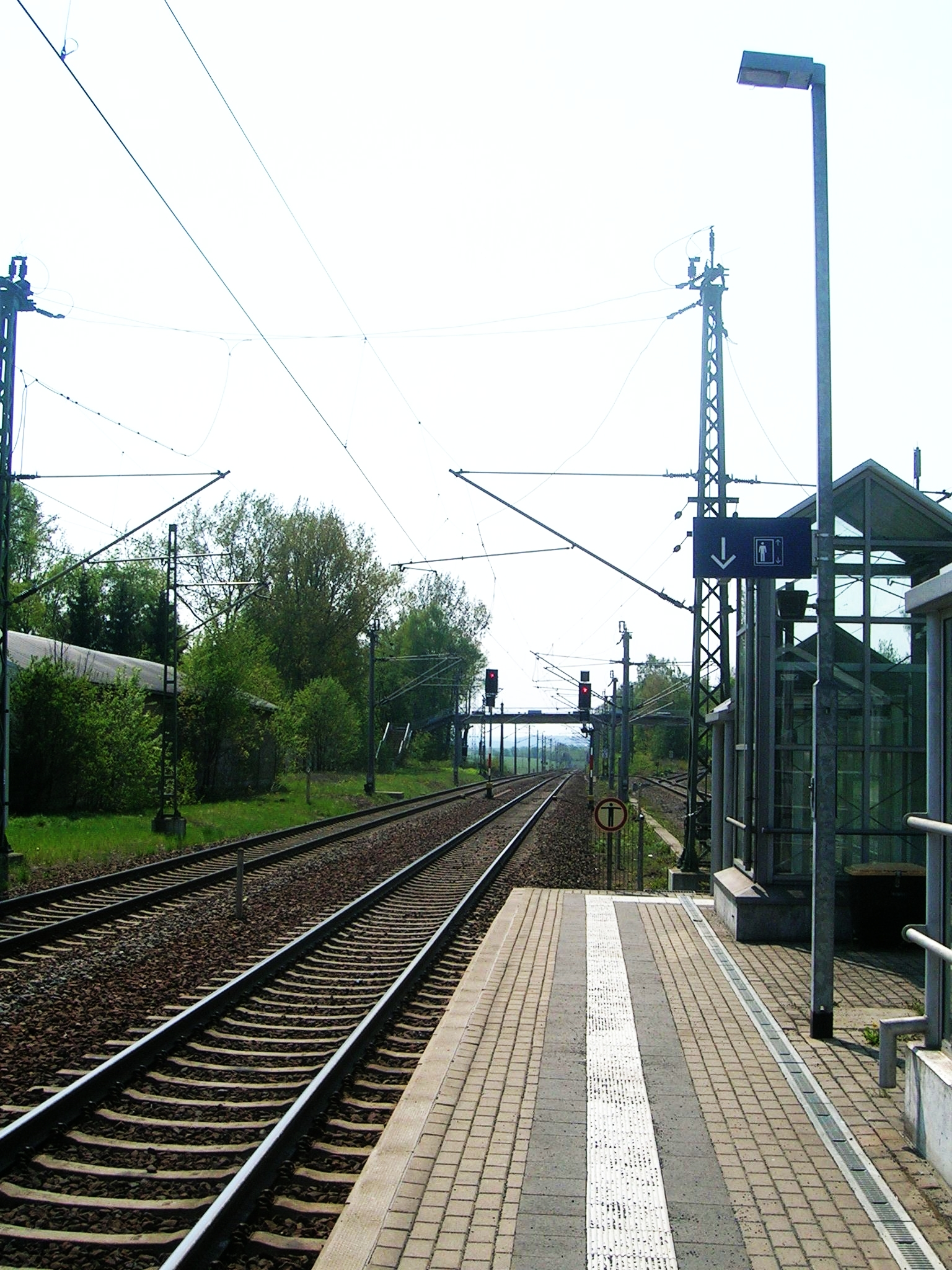
Platform looking towards Freiberg

== Platforms ==
During the narrow-gauge era, the station had two raised outside platforms on the standard-gauge section and two ground level platforms for the two narrow-gauge lines.

== Rail services ==
Both narrow-gauge lines can be viewed as connecting lines of the network around Wilsdruff and Frauenstein, allowing residents to travel by train to work in the Plauenscher Grund (the valley of the Weißeritz downstream from Freital) or for recreation in the Eastern Ore Mountains. 134,000 passengers and about 35,000 tonnes of freight were transported in the first year of operation on the Klingenberg-Colmnitz–Frauenstein railway. Due to the lack of facilities for the rolling stock traffic, the volume of goods stagnated and peaked at 30,000 tonnes per year. In 1914, four pairs of train ran between Klingenberg-Colmnitz and Frauenstein. In 1922, two train pairs operated between Klingenberg-Colmnitz and Naundorf, the terminus of the Klingenberg-Colmnitz-Oberdittmannsdorf railway. In 1925, there were five train pairs between Klingenberg-Colmnitz and Frauenstein and two train pairs between Klingenberg-Colmnitz and Oberdittmannsdorf. In 1932, there were six train pairs between Klingenberg-Colmnitz and Frauenstein and only one train pair between Klingenberg-Colmnitz and Oberdittmannsdorf, which continued to Mohorn. In 1939, there were eight trains between Klingenberg-Colmnitz and Frauenstein. In the war year of 1943, one train pair operated between Klingenberg-Colmnitz and Mohorn. The timetable for 1946/1947 shows only three train pairs for the Klingenberg-Colmnitz–Frauenstein line. In 1950/1951 there were three train pairs on the Klingenberg-Colmnitz–Mohorn line, one of which ended in Naundorf. In 1960, there were six train pairs on the line to Frauenstein. In the last full year of operation, four train pairs operated on the line from Klingenberg-Colmnitz to Mohorn and in the same year there were also four train pairs on the Frauenstein line, one of which only ran on Saturdays.

=== Current services on standard gauge line ===
In 2026, Klingenberg-Colmnitz station was served by the RB30 regional line (Dresden–Freiberg–Chemnitz–Zwickau) and the S3 Dresden S-Bahn line (Dresden–Tharandt–Freiberg). The former runs hourly every day (starting shortly after 5 a.m. and ending shortly before 1 a.m.), the latter also hourly (departing every half hour after the RB30), but only during the weekday peak hours in the morning (three train pairs) and afternoon (four train pairs). The suburban train line is operated by DB Regio Südost, and the RB30 Regiobahn line by Bayerische Oberlandbahn under the marketing name Mitteldeutsche Regiobahn.
