= Tharandt station =

Railway station in Tharandt, Saxony, Germany

Tharandt
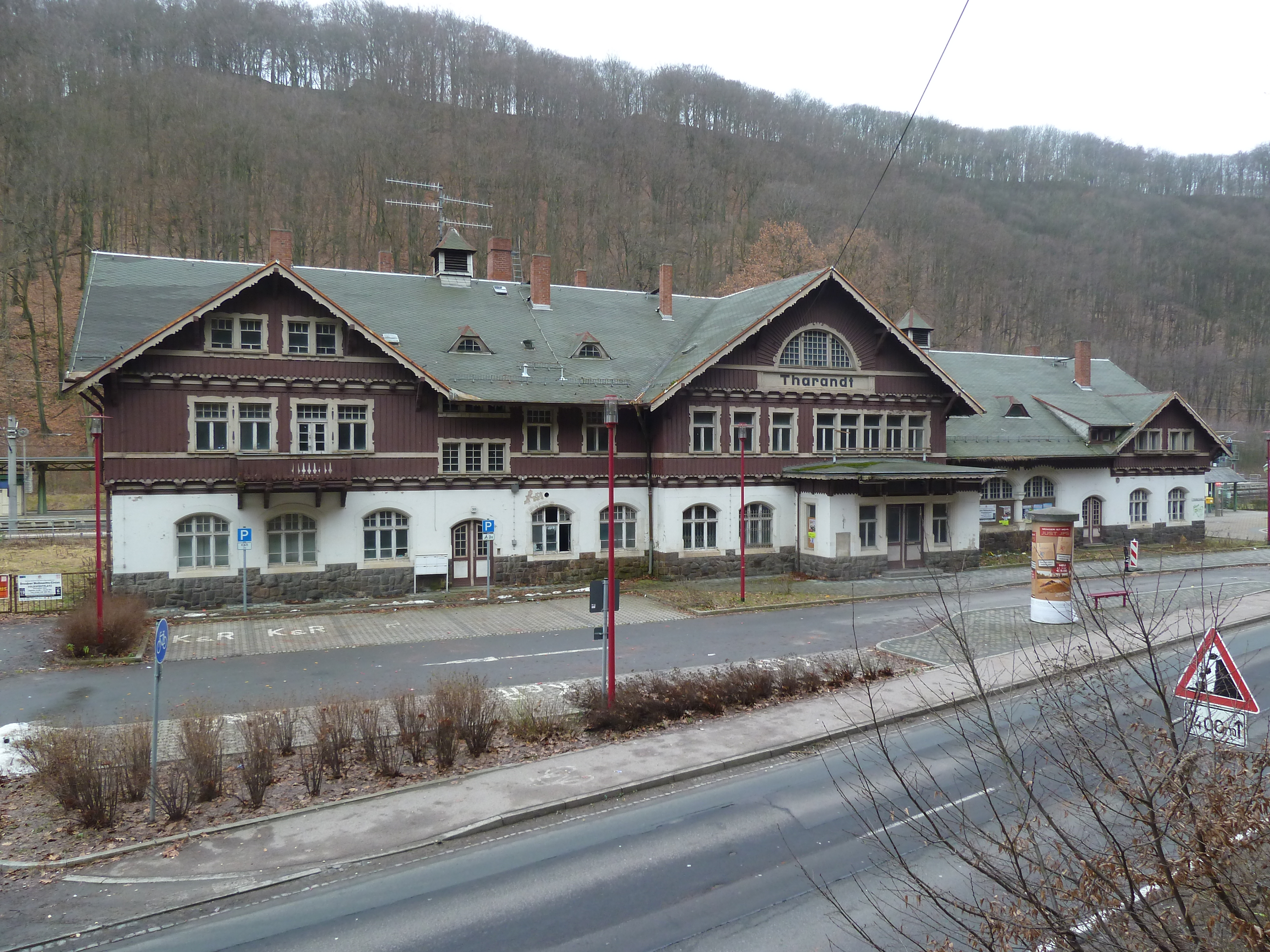
- Entrance building from the street side

General information
- Location: Dresdner Str. 30, Tharandt, Saxony; Germany
- Coordinates: 50°58′59″N 13°35′31″E
- Line: Dresden–Werdau (km 13.705)
- Platforms: 3

Construction
- Accessible: Yes
- Architectural style: Swiss chalet style

Other information
- Station code: 6191
- DS100 code: DTH
- IBNR: 8013114
- Category: 4
- Website: www.bahnhof.de

History
- Opened: 28 June 1855

Services
Preceding station	Mitteldeutsche Regiobahn	Following station
Freiberg (Sachs) towards Hof Hbf	RE 3	Dresden Hbf Terminus
Edle Krone towards Zwickau Hbf	RB 30	Freital-Hainsberg West towards Dresden Hbf
Preceding station	Dresden S-Bahn	Following station
Edle Krone towards Freiberg (Sachs)	S 3	Freital-Hainsberg West towards Dresden Hbf
Location

Tharandt station is a station on the Dresden–Werdau railway in the town of Tharandt in the German state of Saxony. Until the electrification of the line in 1966, Tharandt was an important stopover for the attachment of bank engines for operations on the Steil ramp up to Klingenberg-Colmnitz. Today, the station has only significance for the regional traffic. It is the terminus for most, but not all trains of Dresden S-Bahn's line S3.

== History ==
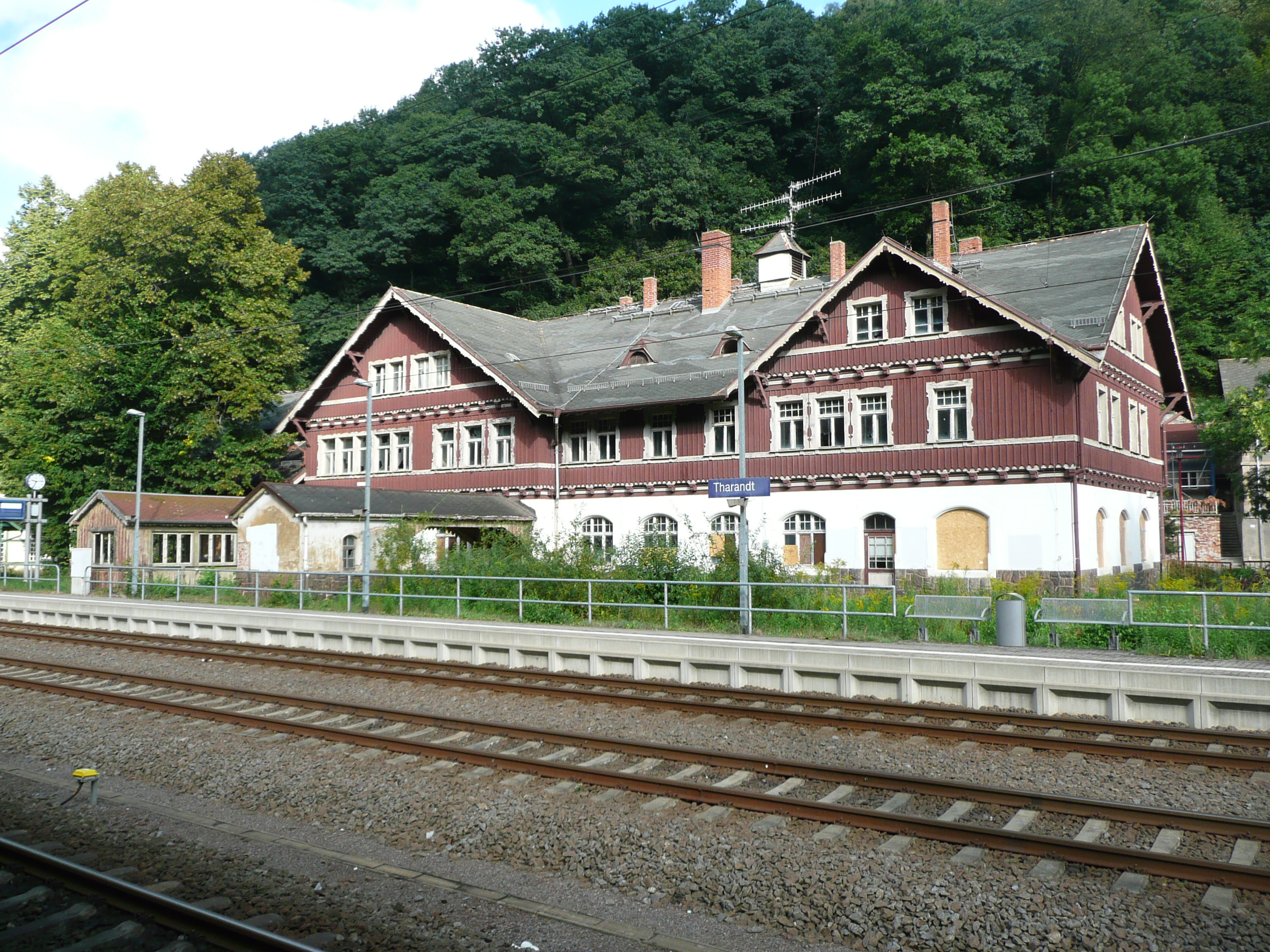
Entrance building, track side

Tharandt station was established on 28 June 1855 with the opening of the Albertsbahn AG and its branches to the coal mines in the Plauensche Grund (the valley of the Weißeritz between Plauen and Freital). The station only became significant in 1862 with the completion of the Dresden-Werdau railway, when the station in the valley at the bottom of the Tharandter Steige ("Tharandt climb") was feared by steam operators. On a twelve kilometre-long section, trains had to climb a height of over 230 metres to reach Klingenberg-Colmnitz station. At least two bank or pilot engines were always stationed in Tharandt to assist trains make the climb. Traffic the section from Dresden to Tharandt developed quickly. As early as 1900, the line from Dresden to Tharandt had reached the limit of its capacity.

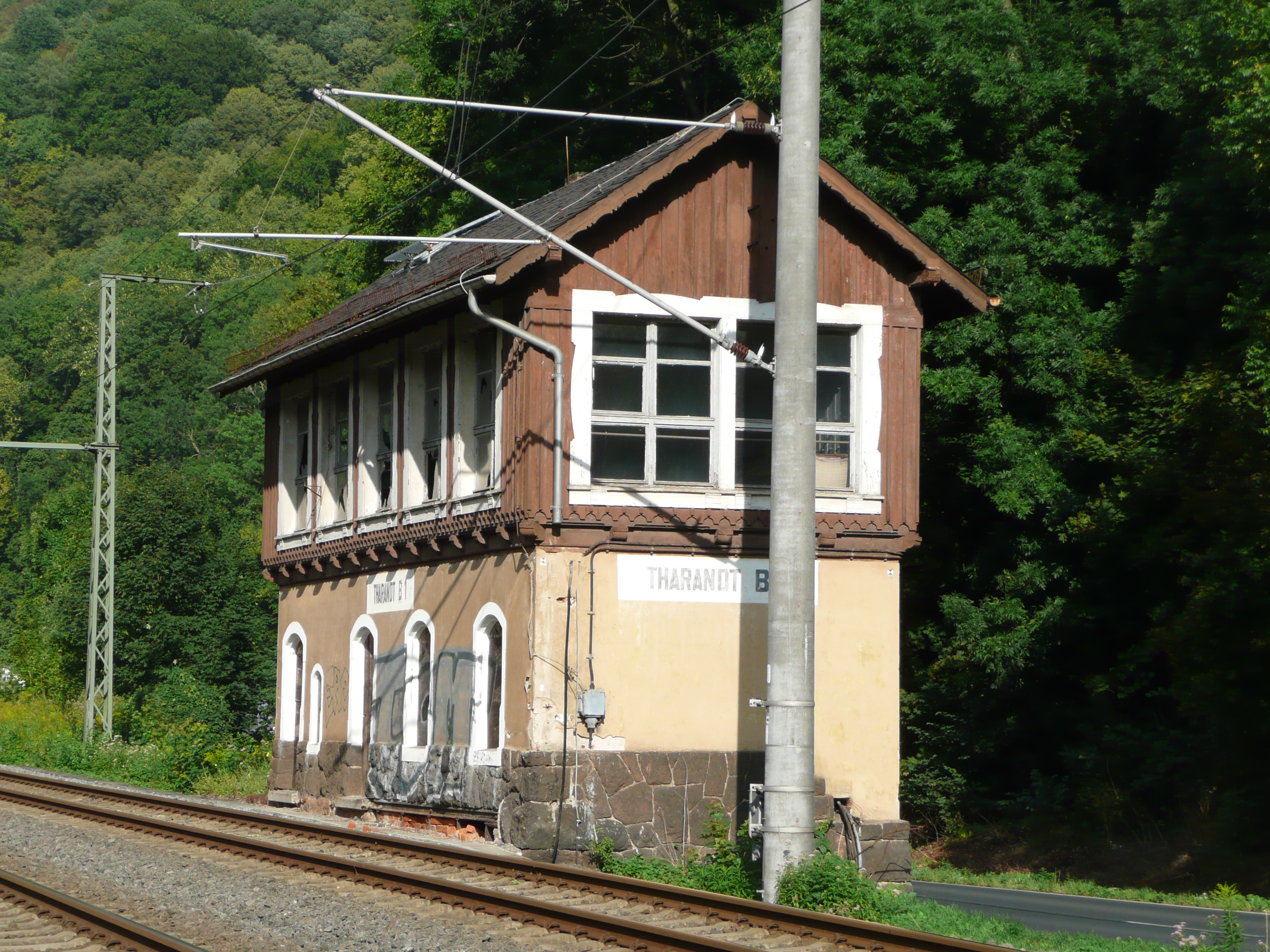
Signal box B1 (2015)

This led to the reconstruction of the whole station. In 1909 an impressive Swiss chalet style entrance building and numerous annexes were built. The network of tracks was greatly enlarged so that there were 17 tracks in the station. It can be seen in old photographs that there was no platform next to the entrance building, but there were two island platforms. There was an underpass for the passengers and for baggage transfer between the entrance building and the platforms, similar to that in Freital-Potschappel. A locomotive depot existed here until the electrification of the station in 1966. Around 1900, two signal boxes were built at the entrances to the station from Dresden and Edle Krone, as well as the numerous outbuildings, such as the office of the head of track maintenance (Bahnmeisterei) and many buildings for rail operations.

The large number of tracks at the station can be explained by the density of rail traffic on the Dresden-Werdau line at that time. Originally the line between Hainsberg and Tharandt consisted of four tracks. At least two bank engines were always stationed at Tharandt station. As the trains on the line, such as the Dresden–Munich express, consisted of at least about seven four-axle express carriages, they needed pilot and bank engines to meet the time table. After the world wars nothing changed. In photographs, the Interzone trains from Görlitz to Munich, which had to make the climb on this section, are depicted with ten four-axle express carriages.

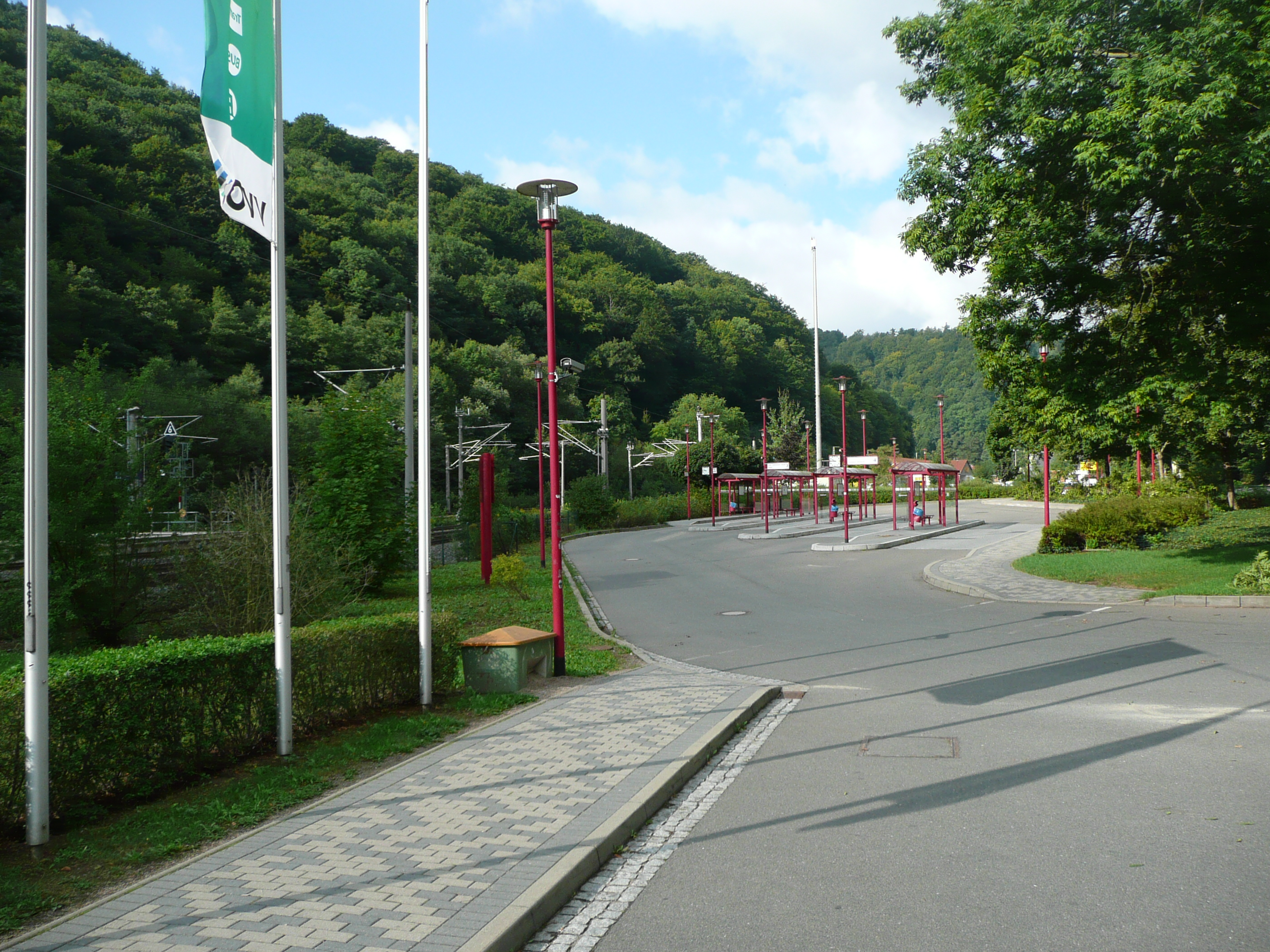
Bus stops in the station forecourt

The Dresden–Werdau railway was electrified in 1966. This had tremendous advantages for operations, since Tharandt station’s bank engines were no longer required. Heavy goods trains were hauled by two class E 42 locomotives and passenger trains were hauled by one locomotive of the same class. The track systems were subsequently simplified. An undated track plan no longer shows a locomotive shed. The largest structural changes were completed after 1989; the luggage transfer lifts on the island platforms were removed, but the exact date of this change is not known. Today only a single-storey building is visible on this platform. The tracks on the station forecourt were removed and replaced by a bus stop and extensive bicycle stands.

The station was equipped with an electronic interlocking in 2001. This resulted in the greatest changes to the station. Since then, it has had only had five through tracks, one island platform and a platform next to the station building. The two mechanical signal boxes were taken out of operation. The tracks in the station were completely destroyed by the Wild Weißeritz during the August 2002 floods, During the reconstruction, some buildings such as the W2 signal box, the track maintenance office and some workshops were demolished. The entrance building has been empty since then and is in poor condition. The sale of the building, which was completed in 2013, has not changed this. A large part of the historic buildings were integrated into the current railway operations and saved from demolition. The B1 signal box was demolished on 9 January 2016 and its site will be used by the cycle track being built between Hainsberg and Tharandt. During the preparations, the heritage protection of the building was lifted.

== Outbuildings of Tharandt station in 2015 ==
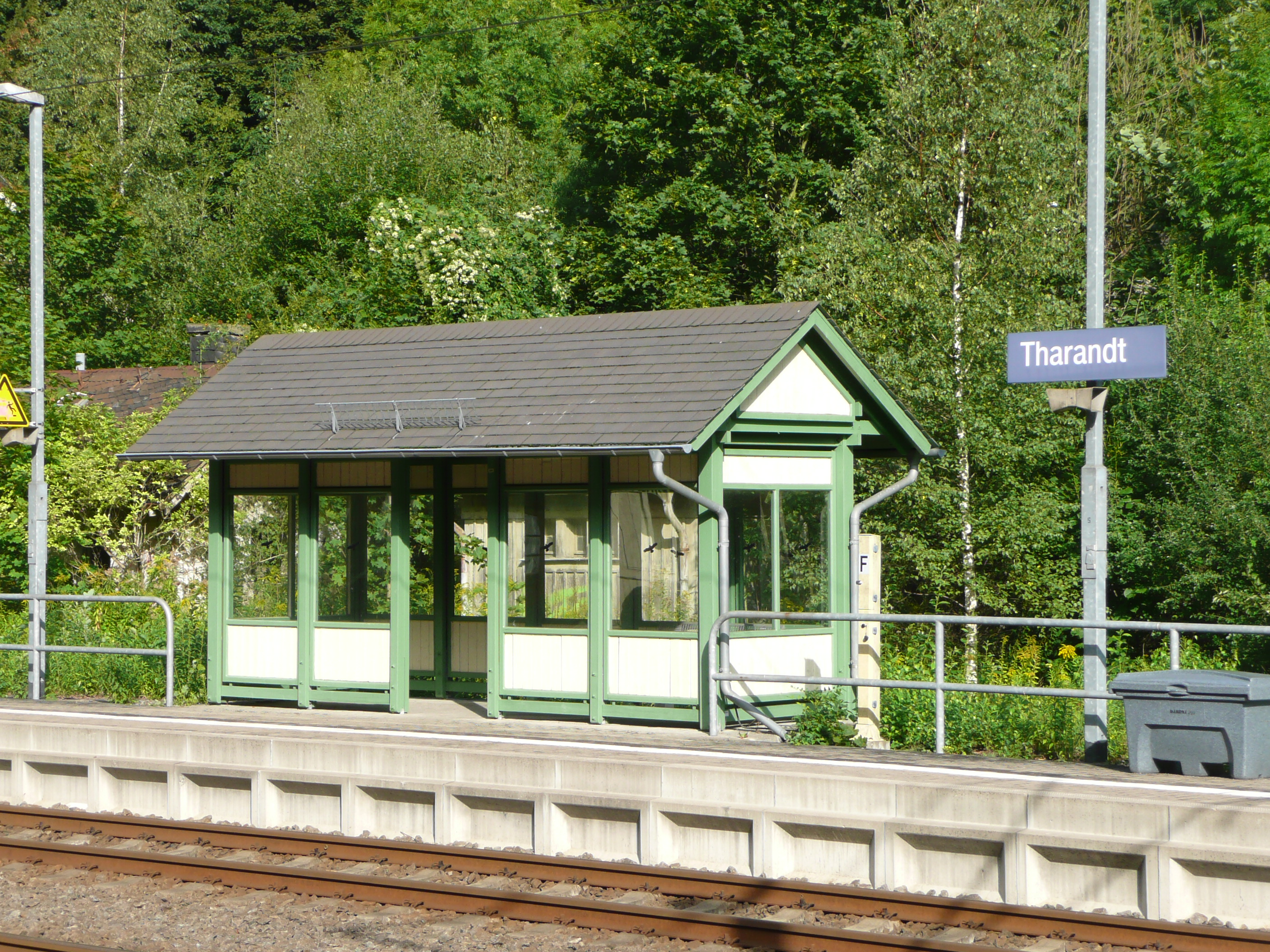
New waiting room on the station building platform

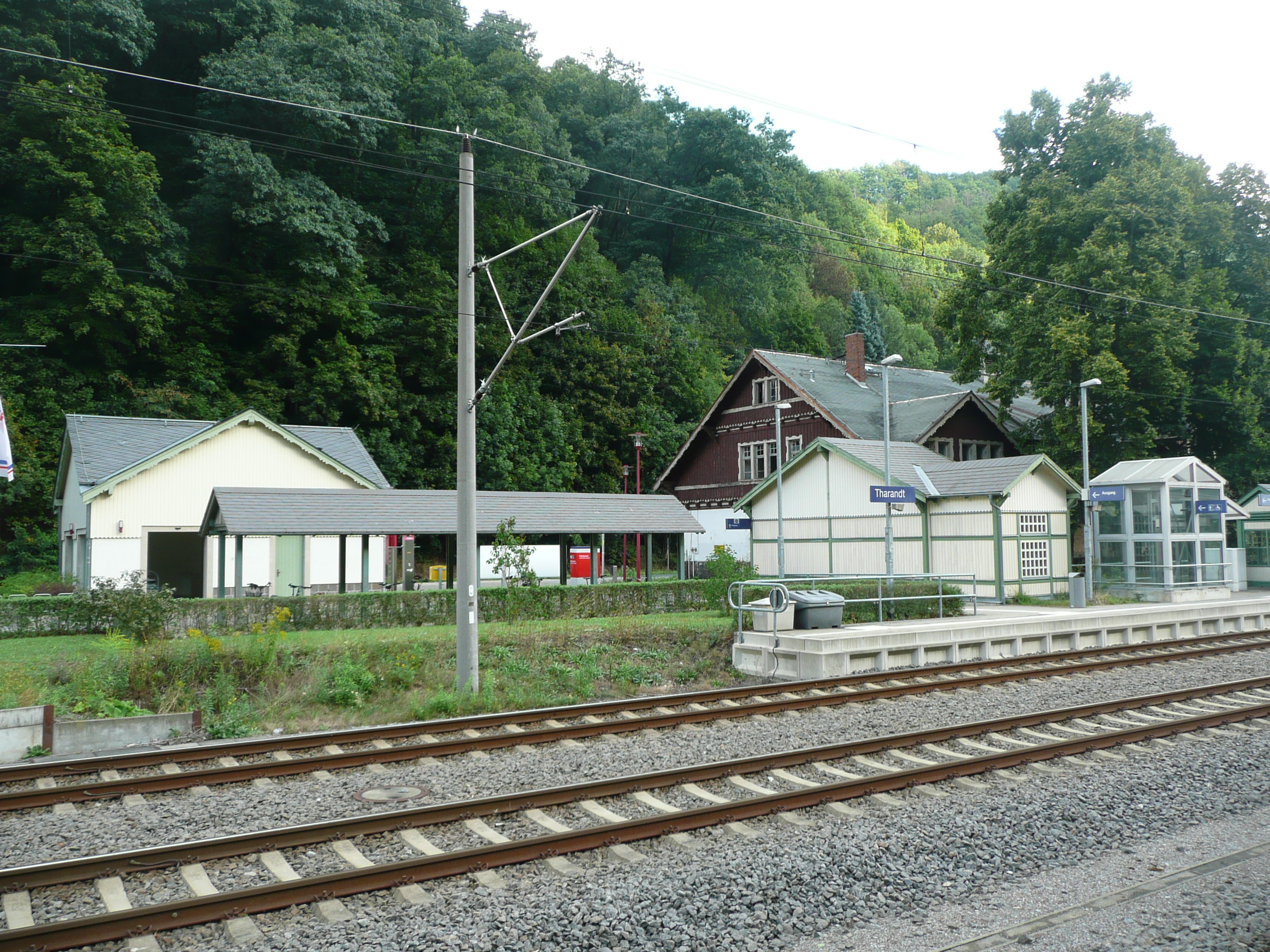
Waiting room, bicycle rack and underpass next to the station building

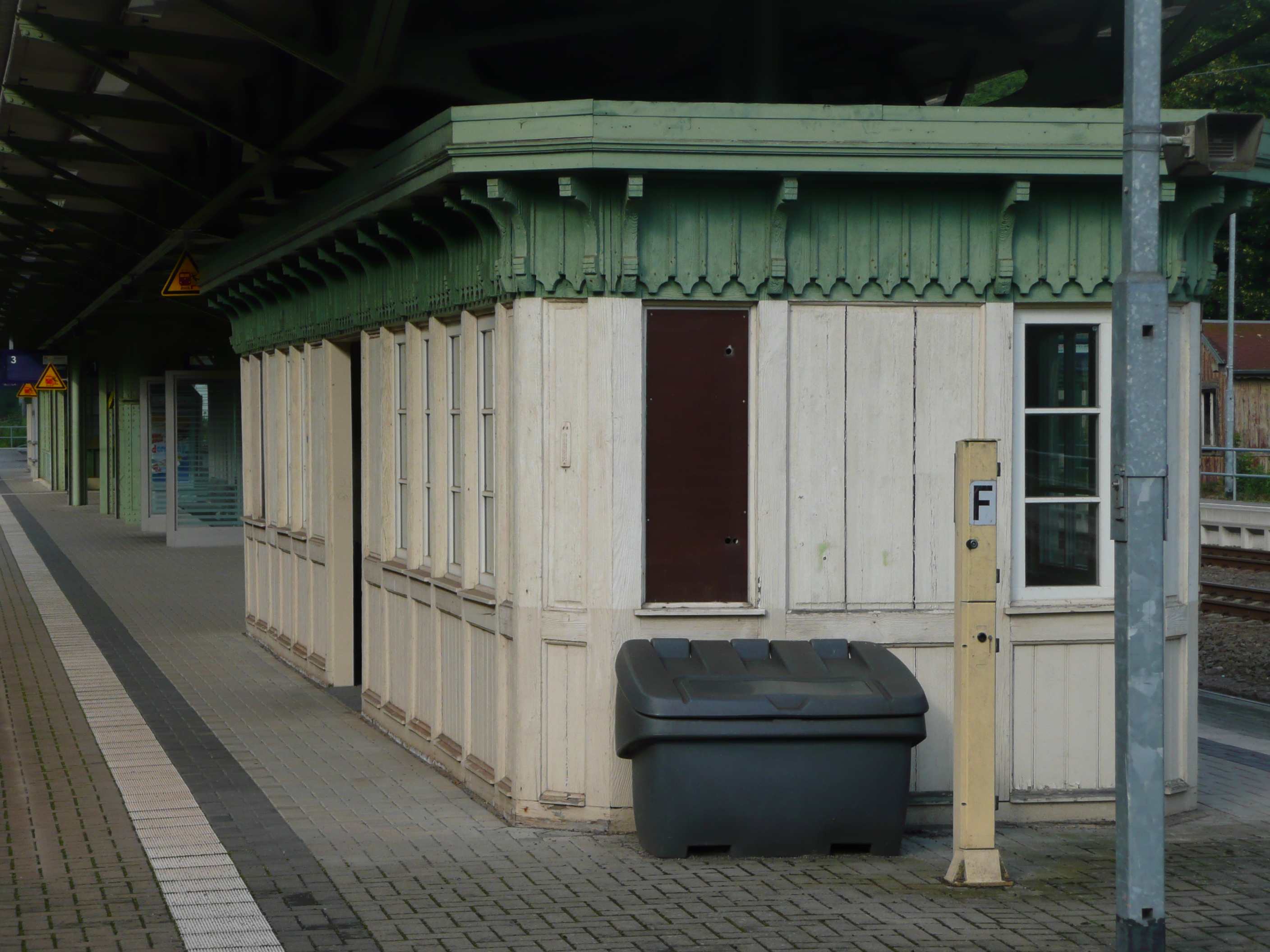
Waiting room on the island platform

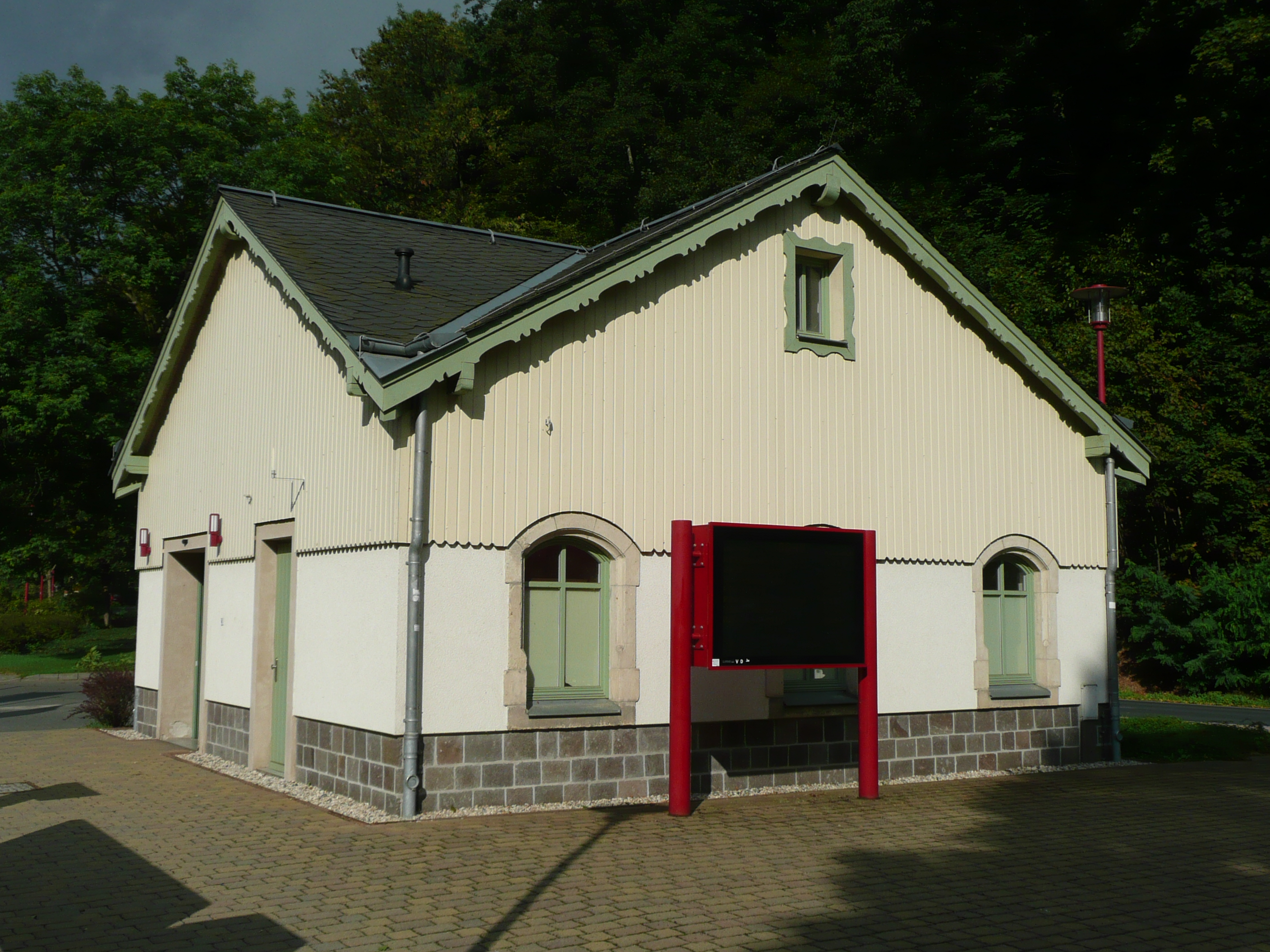
Former work shop converted into a waiting room

== Platforms ==
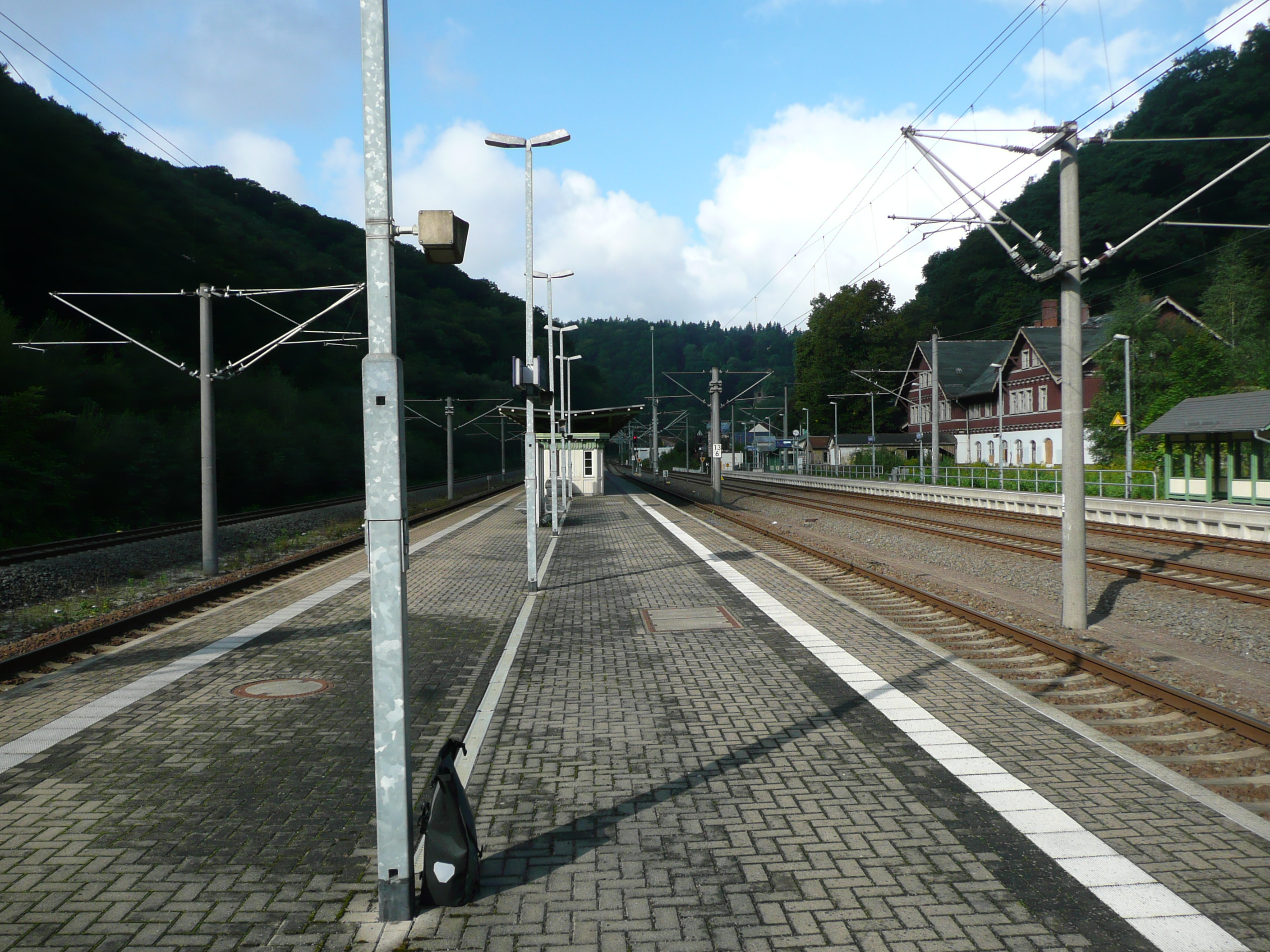
Tharandt station platform

No information can be given on the station’s original tracks and platforms. After the expansion around 1909, the station had two intermediate platforms. The passengers had access to the island platforms via an underpass. The baggage was carried in a luggage transfer tunnel under the main tracks. There was access to the underpass and the luggage lift at the entrance building. The remains of the entrances to the island platforms can still to be seen on the railway side of the station building. The station originally did not have a platform next to the station building and the tracks next the station building were used for bank engines and for access to the goods shed.

Today, the station has three platforms, the station building platform and only one island platform. The access to the island platform is via a former workshop building. Passenger services towards Freiberg run from the station building platform. Trains running to Dresden and the S-Bahn services ending in Tharandt stop at the island platform. There is a track between the station building platform and the island platform and another one behind the island platform for trains not stopping in Tharandt to pass or overtake.

== Rail services ==
In the age of steam, almost all trains had to be pushed up the ramp, which required good logistics at the station for the bank operation and the handling of faster and slower trains. The east-west operations on the line were always very busy for freight and passenger trains. After the electrification, the operations at the station were reduced by the loss of the bank engines. There was a train operation through the station about once an hour and the freight traffic towards Freiberg was still quite considerable until 1989.

Currently (2025), Regional-Express line RE 3 (Dresden–Hof), RE 30 (Dresden–Zwickau), and S-Bahn line S3 (Dresden–Freiberg) run hourly, with the S-Bahn from Dresden terminating in Tharandt outside of peak hours. The operations of freight trains has decreased compared to earlier times.
