= Dresden S-Bahn =

Suburban rail network

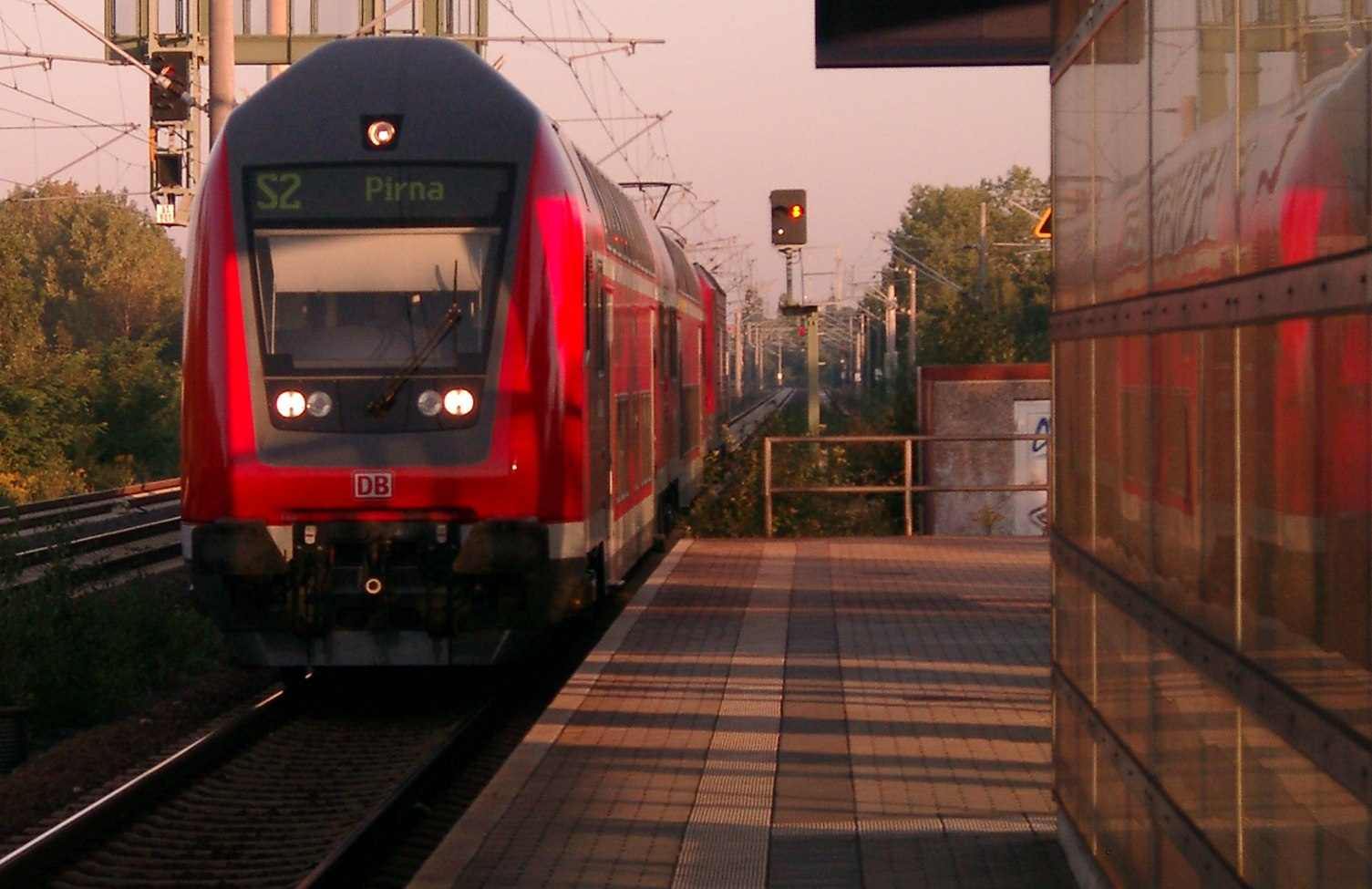
- S 2 train at Dobritz station

Overview
- Locale: Dresden and surrounding districts
- Transit type: Commuter Rail
- Number of lines: 4
- Number of stations: 48
- Annual ridership: 15 million (2017)

Operation
- Began operation: 1974
- Operator: DB Regio Südost

Technical
- System length: 128 km (80 mi)
- Track gauge: 1,435 mm (4 ft 8 1/2 in) (standard gauge)
- Electrification: 15 kV/16.7 Hz AC overhead catenary
System map

The Dresden S-Bahn is a network of S-Bahn-type commuter train services in Dresden and the surrounding area. It is commissioned by Verkehrsverbund Oberelbe (VVO) from DB Regio Verkehrsbetrieb Südostsachsen and currently consists of three services operating over a 127.7 km-long (79.3 mi) network.

The S-Bahn fare structure was introduced on a series of suburban railway lines on 29 September 1974. The term "S-Bahn" has only officially been used for the system since 31 May 1992. Since 24 May 1998, VVO fares have been valid for the S-Bahn Dresden. Outside of Dresden, it runs to the centres of Freital, Meissen, Pirna, Radebeul and since 9 December 2007 also to Freiberg. All lines stop at Dresden Hauptbahnhof.

According to data from the Deutsche Bahn, the Dresden S-Bahn is the S-Bahn with the highest customer satisfaction in Germany.

== Rolling stock ==
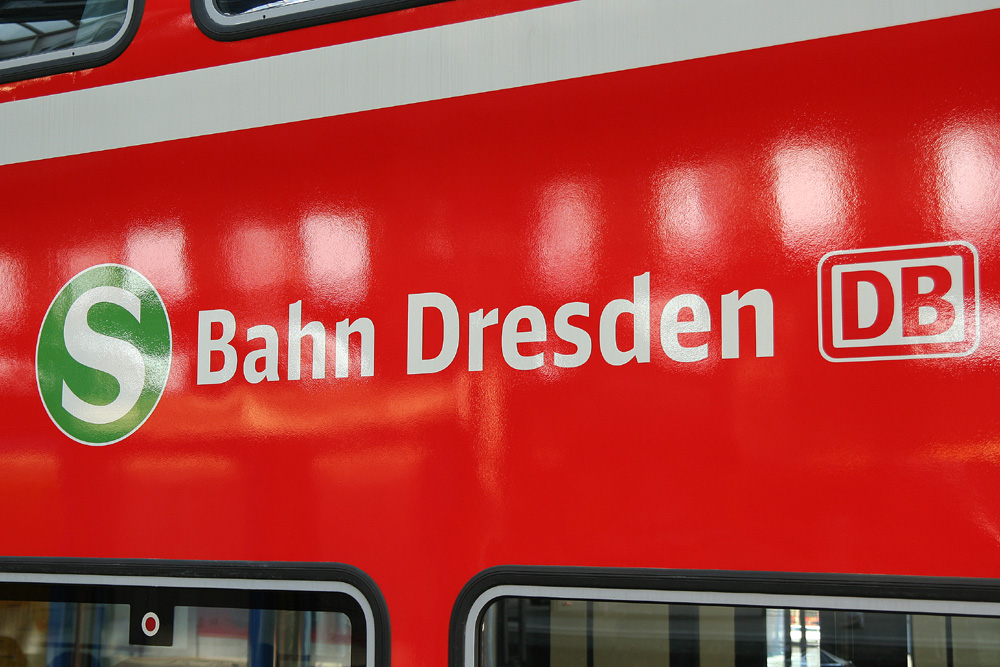
Logo of the Dresden S-Bahn on a double-deck carriage

Services are operated by double-deck-push–pull trains. All trains have 1st and 2nd class seating. As with other S-Bahn services operated by Deutsche Bahn, trains are marked " Bahn Dresden."

From July 2007, 53 new double-deck cars (13 control and 40 middle cars) were gradually delivered by Waggonbau Görlitz for lines S 1 and S 3 until the timetable change on 9. December 2007, replacing the old double-deck cars. The cost of acquiring the 53 cars that are capable of operating at up to 160 km/h (99 mph) was €72 million. On the same day, a new rolling stock depot was opened in the old town of Dresden. The new vehicles were delivered in full by the timetable change in December 2007.

Trains were hauled by class 143 and Bombardier Traxx (class 146.0) locomotives. Siemens ES64U2 (class 182) locomotives were due to take over operations from the timetable change in December 2015.

== Stations ==
=== S-Bahn stations in the Dresden inner city ===
- Dresden Hauptbahnhof (access to the city center; transfer to long-distance and regional services and to trams and buses)
- Dresden Freiberger Straße (access to the city centre and to the World Trade Center Dresden)
- Dresden Mitte (access to Messe Dresden–Dresden exhibition ground–and to the International Congress Center Dresden; transfer to trams and buses)
- Dresden-Neustadt (transfer to long-distance and regional services and to trams and buses)

== Lines ==
The trains of the S-Bahn Dresden run 3.1 million train-kilometres (1.9 million miles) annually. It consists of the following lines:

Line	Route	Station	Length	Travel time	Average speed	Interval	Locomotive
S1	Meißen Triebischtal – Coswig – Radebeul Ost – Dresden-Neustadt – Dresden Hbf – Heidenau – Pirna – Bad Schandau – Schöna	33	77.0 km 47.8 mi	95 min	48 km/h 30 mph	30′ (Meißen Triebischtal – Bad Schandau); 60′ (Bad Schandau – Schöna)	class 143, class 146.0
S2	Dresden Flughafen – Dresden-Neustadt – Dresden Hbf (– Heidenau – Pirna)	17	32.1 km 19.9 mi	46 min	42 km/h 26 mph	30′ (Dresden Hbf – Pirna except Sunday)	class 143
S3	Dresden Hbf – Freital-Hainsberg – Tharandt (– Klingenberg-Colmnitz – Freiberg)	12	40.1 km 24.9 mi	43 min	56 km/h 35 mph	30′ (Dresden Hbf – Tharandt); 60′ (Tharandt – Freiberg only weekdays in the peak)	class 143
S8	Dresden Hbf – Dresden-Neustadt – Radeberg – Pulsnitz – Kamenz	13	48.4 km 30.1 mi	48 min	60 km/h 37 mph	30′ (only weekdays in the peak) 60′	Siemens Desiro Classic

=== Line S 1 ===
Line

Service
- Route number: 241.1

Technical
- Line length: 77.0 km (47.8 mi)

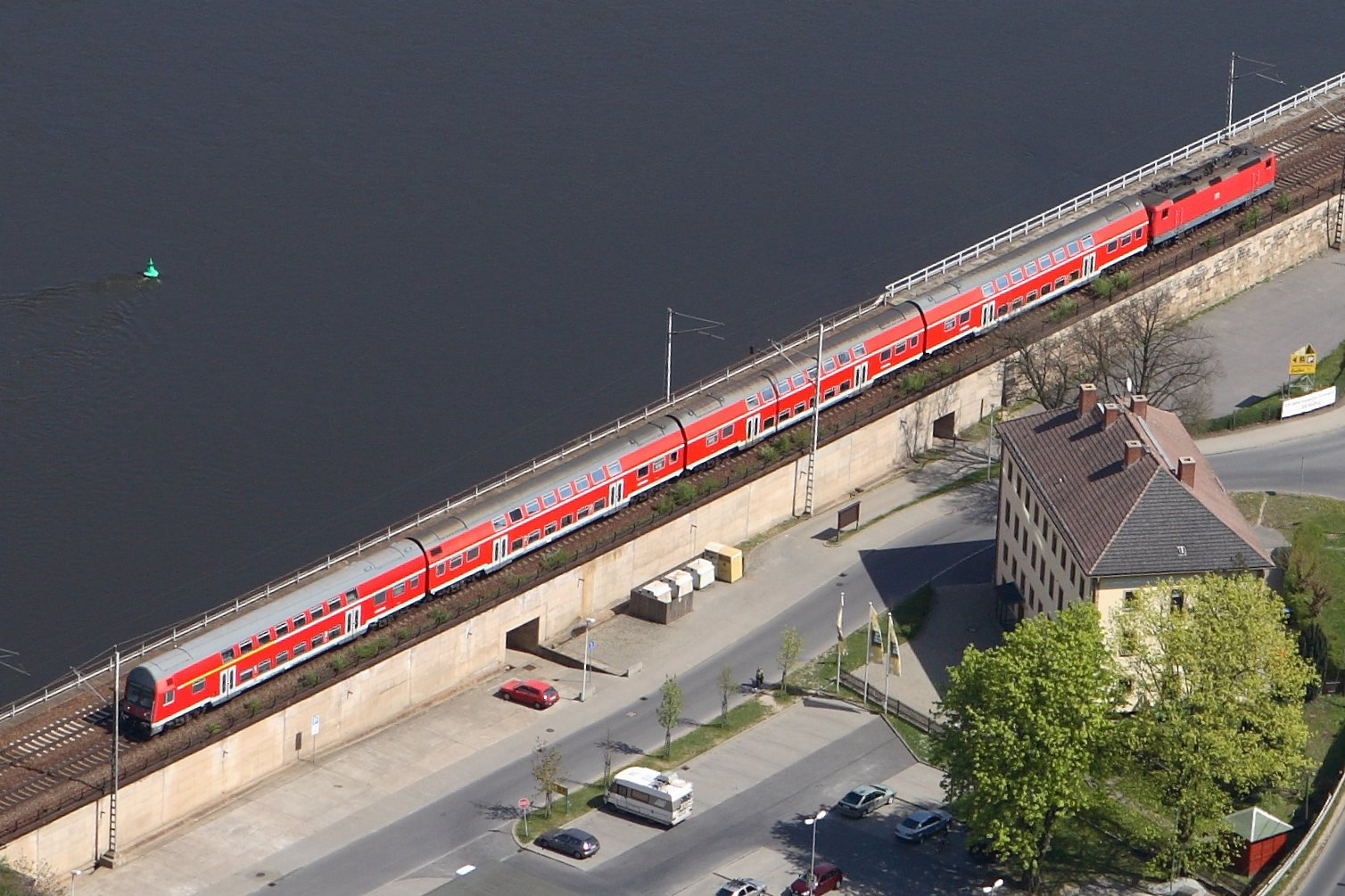
S-Bahn service in Königstein

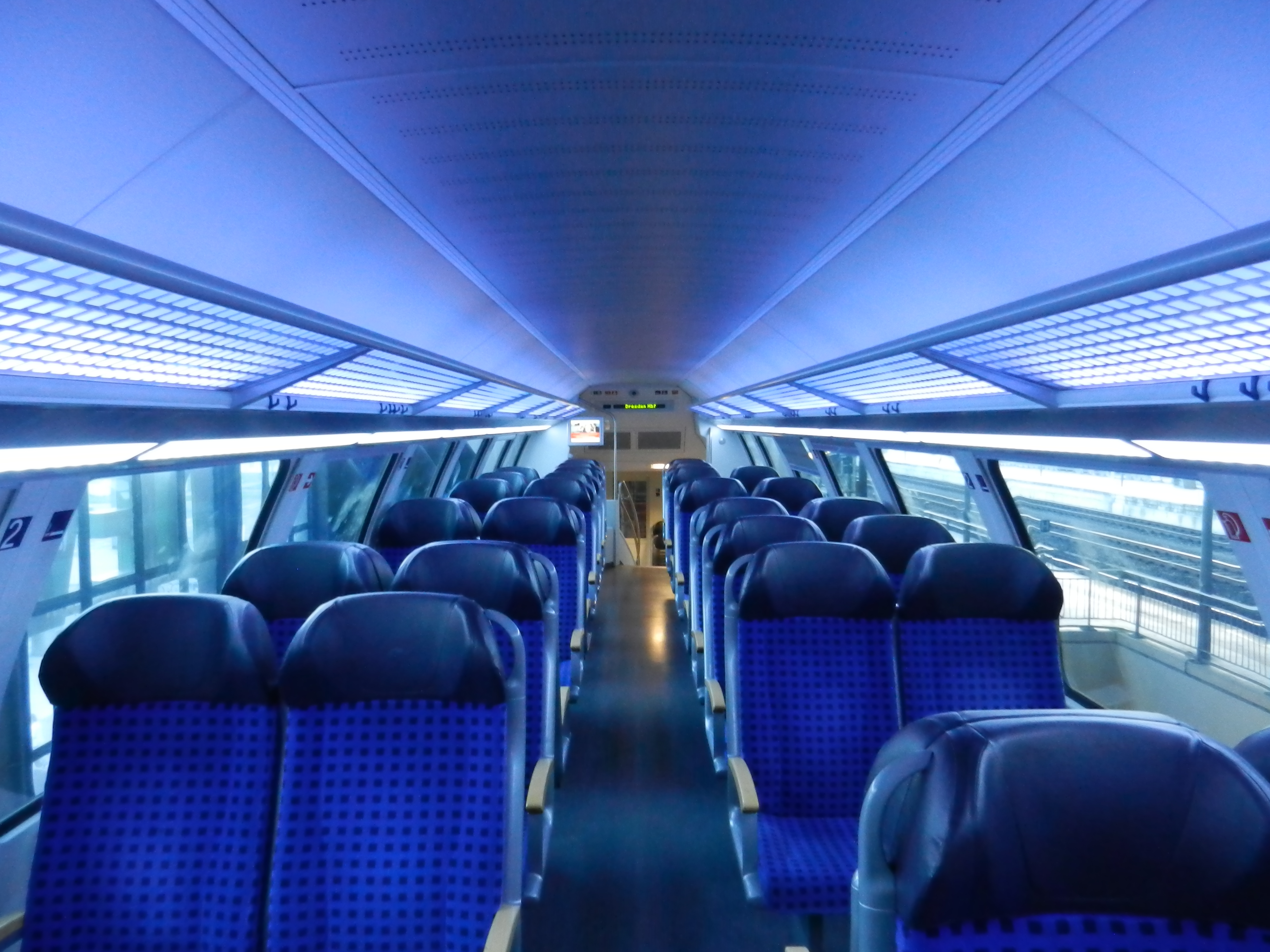
A 2007 double-deck carriage with bluish LED lighting. The carriages are the first of their kind in the world to implement all lighting with LEDs.

Line S 1 is the oldest and most important S-Bahn line in and around Dresden. It connects all the important places in the upper Elbe region with the state capital of Dresden. Commuter traffic and travel for recreation and tourism are still significant. A few isolated places and hiking areas in Saxon Switzerland can be reached better by the S-Bahn than by bus or car.

From Schöna, it runs along the Elbe on the Elbe Valley Railway through the Elbe Sandstone Mountains, through Bad Schandau and past Königstein Fortress to Pirna. There it leaves the immediate bank of the Elbe and runs through Heidenau and southeastern Dresden almost straight to Dresden Hauptbahnhof. It follows a curve through the inner city, crosses the Elbe river and runs after a sharp curve beyond Dresden-Neustadt station next to the Leipzig–Dresden railway. It passes through Radebeul and Coswig, where it branches towards Meißen over the Borsdorf–Coswig railway.

The sets of the S 1 consist basically of four double-decked carriages. For larger events and between Easter and Pentecost the trains run with five double-deck carriages.

Between Dresden and Pirna were the upgrading of the existing tracks for S-Bahn operations at up to 120 km/h (75 mph) (the first stage of the construction of the Dresden S-Bahn; these tracks are now classified as part of the Pirna–Coswig railway) as well as the construction of two new long-distance railway tracks (for 160 km/h (99 mph)) were completed by 12 December 2004.

On 16 July 2007, the first 16 newly procured double-deck carriages were handed over for the S 1. The trains are equipped with air conditioning, an electronic passenger information system, interior lighting by means of light emitting diodes n as well as sockets at the seats in 1st class. The 27.3-metre-long (90 ft) control cars have 82 seats, the 26.8-metre-long (88 ft) middle cars each have 126 seats. By 9 December 2007, the whole S 1 was equipped with new carriages.

From the 2010/2011 timetable change on 12 December 2010, the S 1 services were drawn by locomotives of the class 145. This should result in a four-minute reduction in travel time over the whole route. Since the locomotives do not have sufficient door control for the new double-deck carriages, the trains had attendants the train at each platform. Since the end of 2011, Siemens ES64U2 (class 182) locomotives have replaced the class 145 locomotives. The class 182 locomotives were taken over by DB Regio from DB Schenker and equipped with a local transport package (including a train destination display and side-selective door control).

With a change of 2015/2016 timetable on 13 December 2015, another change was made to class 146.0 locomotives.

=== Line S 2 ===
Line

Service
- Route number: 241.2

Technical
- Line length: 32.1 km (19.9 mi)

The Flughafen-S-Bahn ("Airport S-Bahn") connects Pirna, Heidenau and Dresden with Dresden Airport and the microelectronics companies located in the north of the city. Between Dresden-Neustadt and Pirna/Heidenau (on working days) or Dresden Hbf (on weekends and holidays) S 2 services run along the same route as the S 1 services, so that there are services at intervals alternating between 10 and 20 minutes on this section. The sets of the S 2 are made of two double-deck carriages which, unlike the ones on the S 1 and S 3 services, are equipped with an emergency brake bypass to avoid being stopped in the tunnel to the airport station.

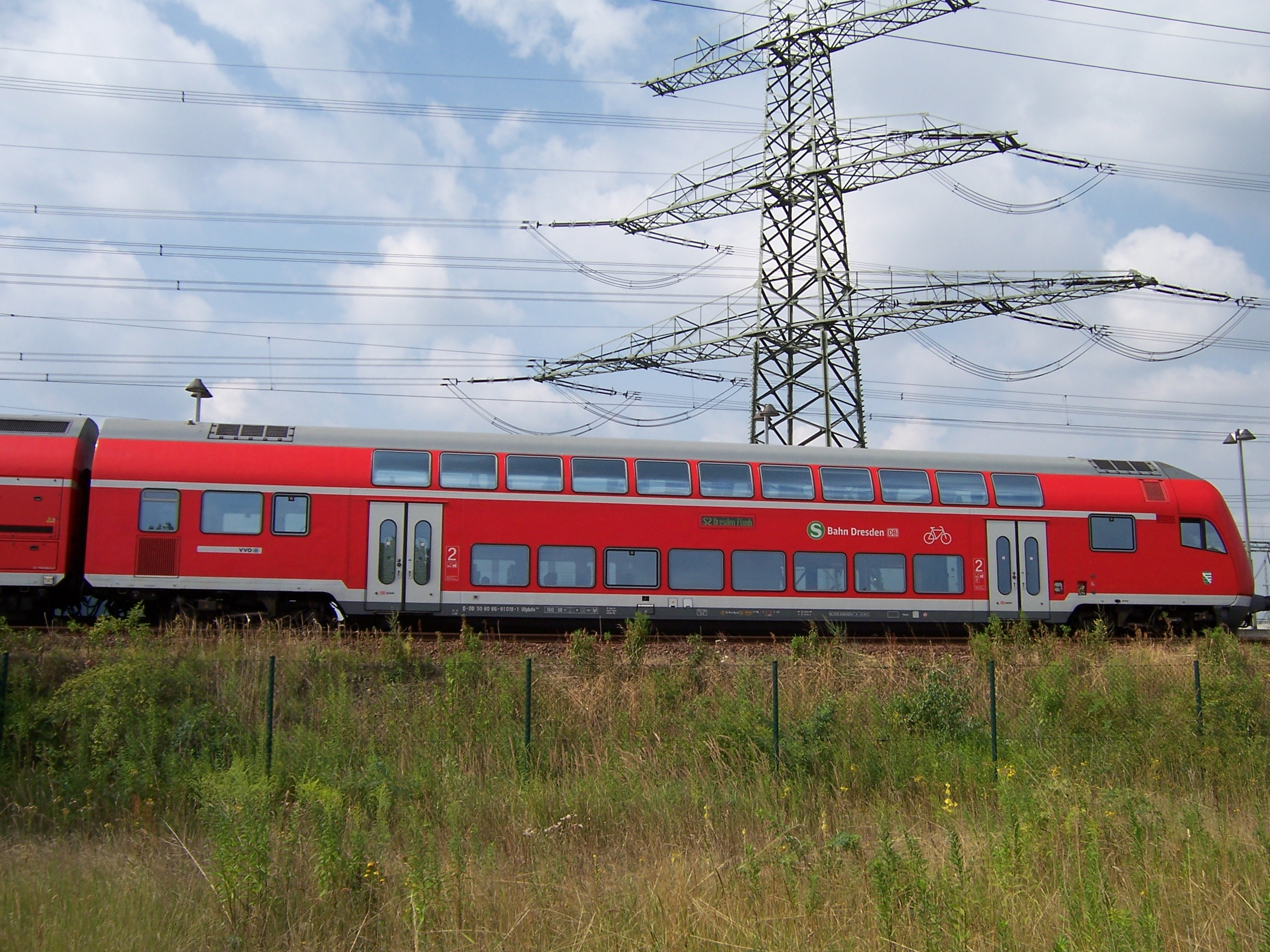
S 2 train running towards the airport at Zschachwitz station

A three-kilometre (1.9 mi) railway line between Dresden-Klotzsche and the airport was rebuilt and extended to connect to the airport. Already before the opening of the S 2 on 22 May 1998 a Regionalbahn service operated to Dresden Grenzstraße and served to connect with EADS EFW and ZMDI. The S 2 branches off the Görlitz–Dresden railway just north of Klotzsche station. Trains running towards the airport pass over the non-electrified line towards Görlitz. The Dresden-Klotzsche–Dresden Airport railway runs as a single track and ends at a double-track underground station under the terminal of Dresden Airport.

The construction of the new and upgraded line began In the middle of 1998. The beginning of operations to the airport coincided with the commissioning of the new airport terminal, on 25 March 2001 with 36 diesel multiple units services operating daily at half-hour intervals. In the first five months of operations, the average utilisation rate was maintained at 32%, with a total of 1,400 passengers per day. Around 810,000 passengers were counted on the line by the end of 2001.

The electrification of the 14-kilometre-long (8.7 mi) sections between Dresden-Neustadt and the airport began at the beginning of March 2002. In 2002, 683,000 travelers were counted on the line.

By the end of 2004, the operations consisted of a total of eight newly procured double-deck vehicles. These include, among other things, air conditioning, a barrier-free toilet and electric sockets in first class. The line was extended to Pirna at the timetable change in December 2004. Some of the 1st class seats were redesignated as 2nd class seats. From 9 December 2007, services of the S 2 were generally operated with three double-deck carriages due to the increased demand. From 2009 onwards, two or three carriages were used depending on the demand, but since 2011 only trains with two double-deck carriages have operated on this line.

Around two million passengers were counted on the line in 2005 and it was 2.8 million in 2010.

Until the timetable change on 30 May 1999, the S 2 service operated on the Dresden Hbf–Radeberg–Arnsdorf (b Dresden) route. These S 2 services reversed in the Arnsdorf (b Dresden) carriage train to continue as Regionalbahn services to Kamenz, Görlitz or Zittau. It was at that time the only S-Bahn line that was operated with diesel-hauled push-pull trains.

=== Line S 3 ===
Line

Service
- Route number: 510.3

Technical
- Line length: 40.1 km (24.9 mi)

The S 3 service runs on the Dresden–Werdau railway from the Hauptbahnhof towards Chemnitz. It passes through the Plauenscher Grund ("Plauen ground"), the deep valley of the Weißeritz between Plauen and Freital. From Freital it runs in the valley of Wilde Weißeritz to Tharandt. The line was almost completely destroyed by August 2002 floods. After it had been put back into operation after the flood damage had been repaired at the end of 2003, around 2,300 passengers per day were counted.

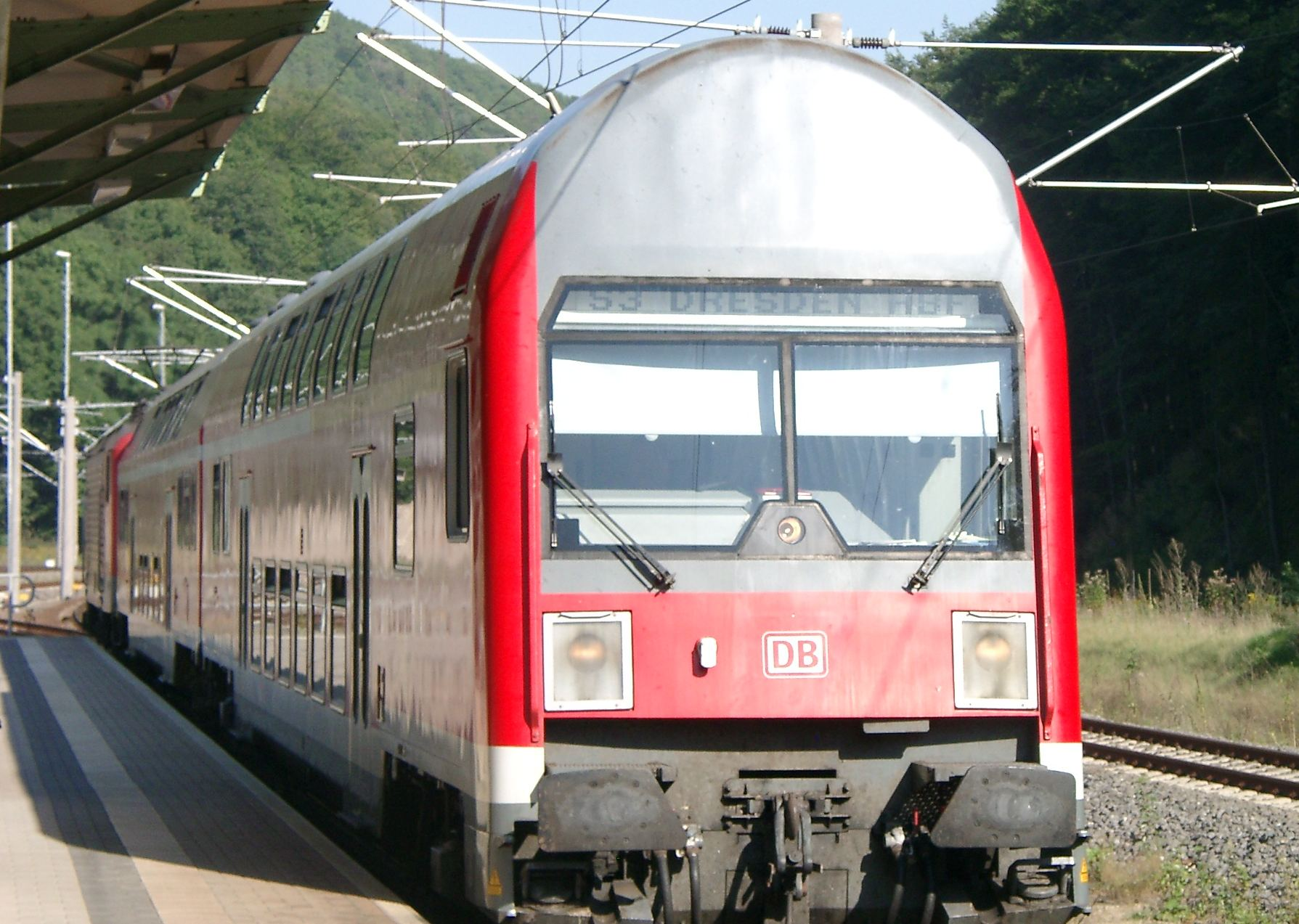
S 3 service in Tharandt

Inside Dresden, the next stop on the S 3 after the Hauptbahnhof is Dresden-Plauen station. In Freital the S-Bahn line serves large parts of the populated areas. The town of Freital was founded in 1921 from the three villages of Potschappel, Deuben and Döhlen; in 1964 Hainsberg was also incorporated. Next to the Freital-Deuben station, there is a bus station with connections to ten regional and six local bus routes. The railway line runs along the traffic axis of the town, which is also serves as the main axis of Freital's bus routes. Typically, sets of two double-deck carriages are used.

Until the timetable change in May 1995, operated S 3 as S 5. Between 9 December 2007 and 11 December 2010, it operated as a supplementary line to S 3, line S 30 and since the timetable change on 12 December 2010, the entire line between Dresden Hbf and Freiberg has operated as S 3. It normally begins and ends in Tharandt, but it serves the stations of Edle Krone, Klingenberg-Colmnitz, Niederbobritzsch, Muldenhütten and Freiberg (Sachs) running to Freiberg from Monday to Friday in the morning peak and from Freiberg in the afternoon peak. It is the only Dresden S-Bahn line that runs outside the area of the Upper Elbe Transport Association. Between Niederbobritzsch and Freiberg the fares of the Verkehrsverbund Mittelsachsen (Mid-Saxony transport association) apply.

Since beginning of 2012, the service has been hauled by a class 145 locomotive. As of the end of October, a circuit was operated by a Bombardier Talent 2 set on staff training and since 1 January 2013 all circuits have been scheduled to be hauled by class 143.

=== Line S 8 ===
Line

Service
- Route number: 227

Technical
- Line length: 48.4 km (30.1 mi)

The S8 line is a diesel-powered S-Bahn line in the north of Dresden. It emerged on December 12, 2021, from the former RB34, which was extensively renovated and expanded until then.

=== Other railway lines in the area of the S-Bahn ===
==== Regional-Express ====
Various Regional-Express lines run from Dresden Hauptbahnhof to Chemnitz (via Freital, Tharandt), Cottbus and Hoyerswerda (via Cossebaude, Coswig and Ruhland) and Elsterwerda, with some stopping at Dresden stations (Dresden-Friedrichstadt, Dresden-Cotta, Cossebaude among others) on the Berlin-Dresden railway, which is not included in the Dresden S-Bahn network. The Trilex Express runs from Dresden Hauptbahnhof to Görlitz or Zittau (via Klotzsche, Radeberg). When there are good conditions for winter sports, two additional trains run through the Eastern Ore Mountains (Osterzgebirge) to Altenberg. In addition, a Regional-Express runs from Dresden Hauptbahnhof via Heidenau and Pirna to Děčín in the Czech Republic.

==== Regionalbahn services ====
Trilex Regionalbahn services towards Görlitz and Zittau have formed the local services corresponding with the Trilex-Express services between Dresden and Bischofswerda since the timetable change in December 2008 (then still operated by DB Regio Südost). These operate at approximately half-hour intervals and provide an S-Bahn-like service on these diesel-powered lines. Two other services are operated into Upper Lusatia (Oberlausitz) by the Städtebahn Sachsen and connect Dresden with Kamenz and Königsbrück hourly. Another service runs from Heidenau (connecting to S-Bahn lines S 1 and S 2) through the Müglitz valley to Altenberg. The Heidenau–Altenberg and the Pirna–Neustadt (Sachs)–Sebnitz–Bad Schandau services are also operated by Städtebahn Sachsen.

Due to the re-commissioning of the Rumburk–Sebnitz railway between Dolni Poustevna and Sebnitz, which had been interrupted since 1945, a passenger service operated by the Czech Railways with Deutsche Bahn's Desiro railcars and classified by Deutsche Bahn as U 28 – Nationalparkbahn (“National Park Railway”) runs from Rumburk (Czech Republic) via Sebnitz and Bad Schandau to Děčín (Czech Republic). Since then, Städtebahn Sachsen has operated the Sebnitz–Bad Schandau and return services only once a day.

==== Narrow-gauge railways ====
Two narrow-gauge railways connect the S-Bahn network to two nearby 750 mm gauge railways. In Radebeul Ost (connection to S 1), it is possible to change to the Radebeul–Radeburg railway (Lößnitzgrundbahn). In Freital-Hainsberg (connection to S 3) there is interchange with the Weisseritz Valley Railway (Weisseritztalbahn), which was put out of operation by the 2002 flood, although the Freital-Hainsberg–Dippoldiswalde section was reopened on 13 December 2008.

== Network extensions ==
=== Completed construction measures ===
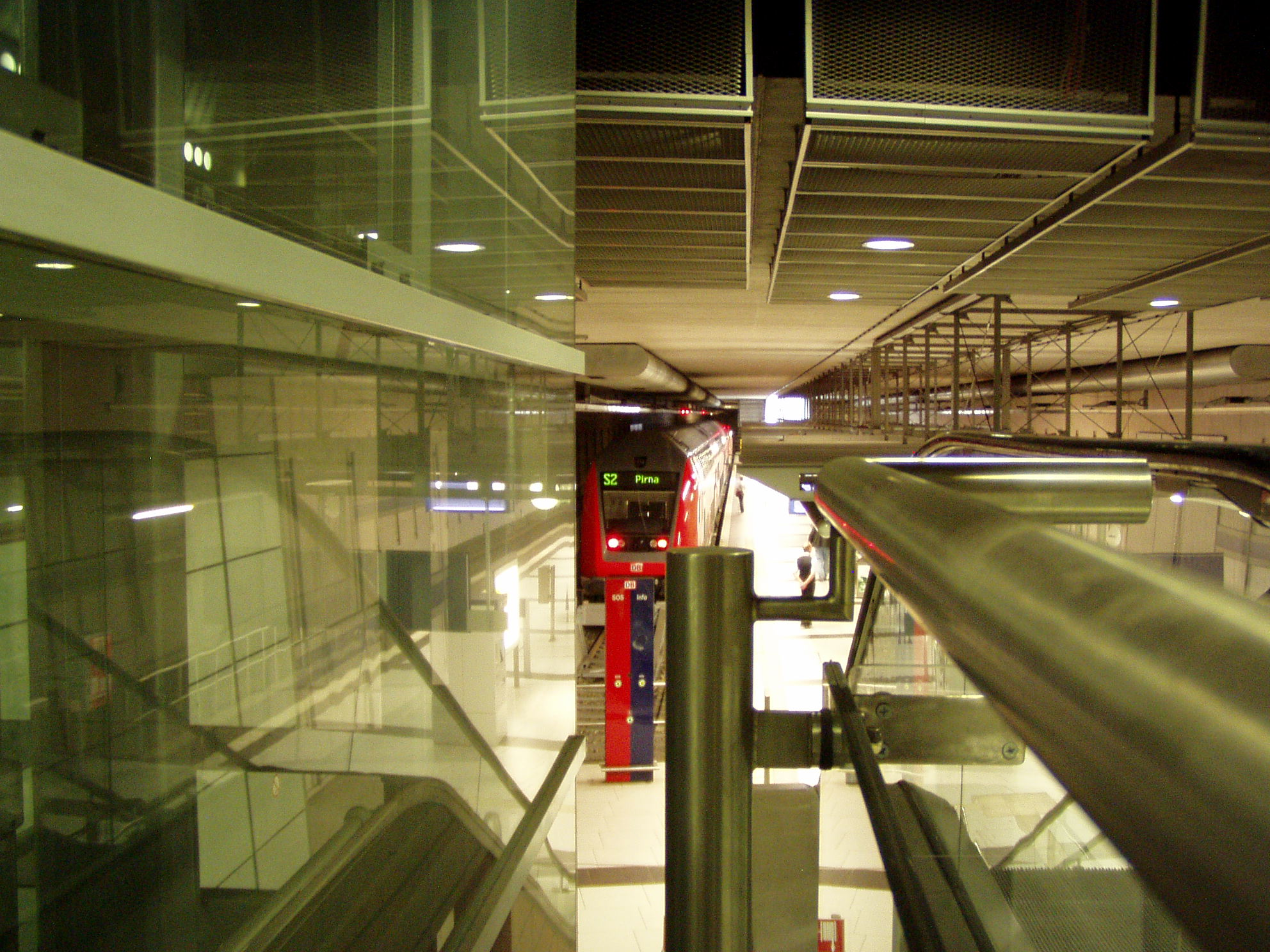
Dresden Airport station

The S-Bahn has had two tracks for its own operations between Dresden-Neustadt and Pirna since 2004, between Radebeul Ost and Coswig since 2013 and between Radebeul Ost and Dresden-Neustadt since 2016. These tracks had been built before the Second World War, but had been dismantled as reparations after the war. This allows additional services to be run in the peak between Pirna and Dresden-Neustadt, although on the S 2 only from between Pirna and the Hauptbahnhof. Before the electrification of the line to the airport, the S 2 services were operated exclusively with class 642 diesel multiple units, which were covered with advertising for Dresden Airport. Since the timetable change in December 2004, however, newly procured double-deck trains have also been used on this line. The railcars that were formerly used have been operating on other regional lines and the advertising was gradually removed between 2007 and 2010.

The Dresden S-Bahn has modern facilities and stations everywhere. The construction measures were partly planned in the long term and partly "forced" in the short term by the 2002 flood. The development of the Dresden-Pirna line alone cost €222 million, according to Verkehrsverbund Oberelbe. The cost of repairing the damage cannot be calculated to separate damage from the long-distance tracks from the S-Bahn tracks.

After about one year of construction, the new Meißen Altstadt station near the centre and the restored second track between Meißen and Meißen-Altstadt were opened on 30 November 2013 on the Borsdorf–Coswig railway. According to the original call for tenders, construction planning, construction preparation and construction work between Meißen and Meißen-Triebischtal was expected to run between August 2012 and August 2014.

The new Dresden-Bischofsplatz station was put into operation between Dresden-Neustadt and Dresden-Pieschen on 20 March 2016.

=== The S-Bahn in Dresden transport planning ===
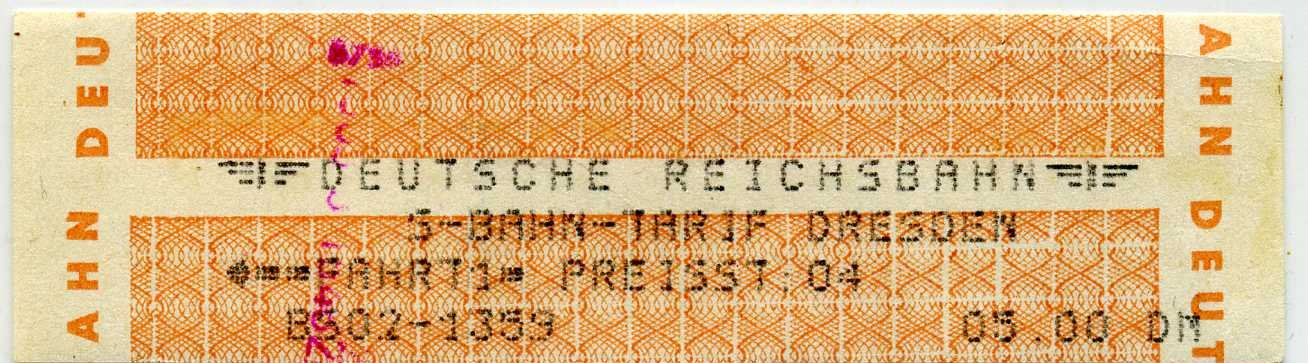
S-Bahn ticket, 1994

In the first half of the 1990s, the comprehensive Verkehrskonzept ("transport concept") 1994 was developed for Dresden and the surrounding area and adopted by the city council. The surrounding area included Riesa in the north-west, Bischofswerda in the north-east and Freiberg in the south-west in addition to the area around Pirna.

S-Bahn lines were planned from the Hauptbahnhof to Riesa and Großenhain on the route via Cossebaude. Only one line was planned on the four-track line via Radebeul to Coswig. The S 2 line would have alternated between Königsbrück and the airport (the last option was implemented). S-Bahn lines from Bischofswerda and Kamenz would have run on the main line via Dresden-Neustadt to Heidenau and end in Dohna on the Müglitz Valley Railway. Heidenau, Pirna and Bad Schandau were not considered as possible end points. The traffic concept had four S-Bahn lines on the main route, with its own S-Bahn tracks, which between them would have run every 7.5 minutes. However, these plans had already been rejected by the end of the 1990s. The S-Bahn line to Tharandt would have been extended to Freiberg, which has been partly realised since the timetable change of 9 December 2007 as the S 30 (now S 3).

=== Other considerations ===
In addition to the already newly built S-Bahn stations of Dresden Freiberger Straße, Dresden Flughafen, Meißen Altstadt and Dresden Bischofsplatz, the transport development concept 2025 of the city of Dresden includes another S-Bahn station in Dresden at the corner of Königsbrücker Straße and Stauffenbergallee (S 2). In addition, the existing Strehlen station is to be developed into a central interchange between the S-Bahn, trams and buses. It is also proposed to establish another S-Bahn line between the Hauptbahnhof and Coswig. This is intended to strengthen existing regional traffic. The goal is services every 30 minutes via Friedrichstadt and Cotta. In Cotta a new central station is to be created with connections to buses and trams. Concrete plans for these objectives are not known.

== Passenger numbers ==
37,300 passengers per day use the Dresden S-Bahn lines from Mondays to Fridays (as of 2012). These are about 70% of the railway passengers in the VVO area. In November 2013, Deutsche Bahn reported the number of daily passengers at around 36,000.

The individual lines recorded the following average daily passenger numbers in 2015:

S1 Dresden – Schöna

- weekdays: 14,420 passengers (2009: 12,060 passengers)
- weekends/holidays: 13,760 passengers (2009: 12,085 passengers )

S2 Dresden – Pirna

- weekdays: 3,690 passengers (2009: 4,190 passengers)

S3/RB30 Dresden – Tharandt

- weekdays: 5,450 passengers (2009: 4,480 passengers)
- weekends/holidays: 3,360 passengers (2009: 2,775 passengers)

== Invitation to tender for transport services ==
On 11 March 2008, the Zweckverband Verkehrsverbund Oberelbe (ZVOE) published a tender for passenger operations on all lines of the Dresden S-Bahn. These were combined in lot 1. Lot 2 included Regionalbahn lines RB33 (Dresden–Königsbrück) and RB34 (Dresden–Kamenz). Lot 3 included Regionalbahn lines RB 71 (Pirna–Neustadt–Bad Schandau) and RB72 (Heidenau–Altenberg) as well as the winter sports express service RE 19 (Dresden–Heidenau–Altenberg).

The interested companies and those admitted to the tender had the opportunity to submit their offers to the ZVOE. Many companies expressed their interest in the transport services by 28 July 2008. A formal negotiation took place to determine the most economical tenders. Operations on the tendered routes would commence in December 2010. The new contracts have a ten-year term and four-year extensions are planned.

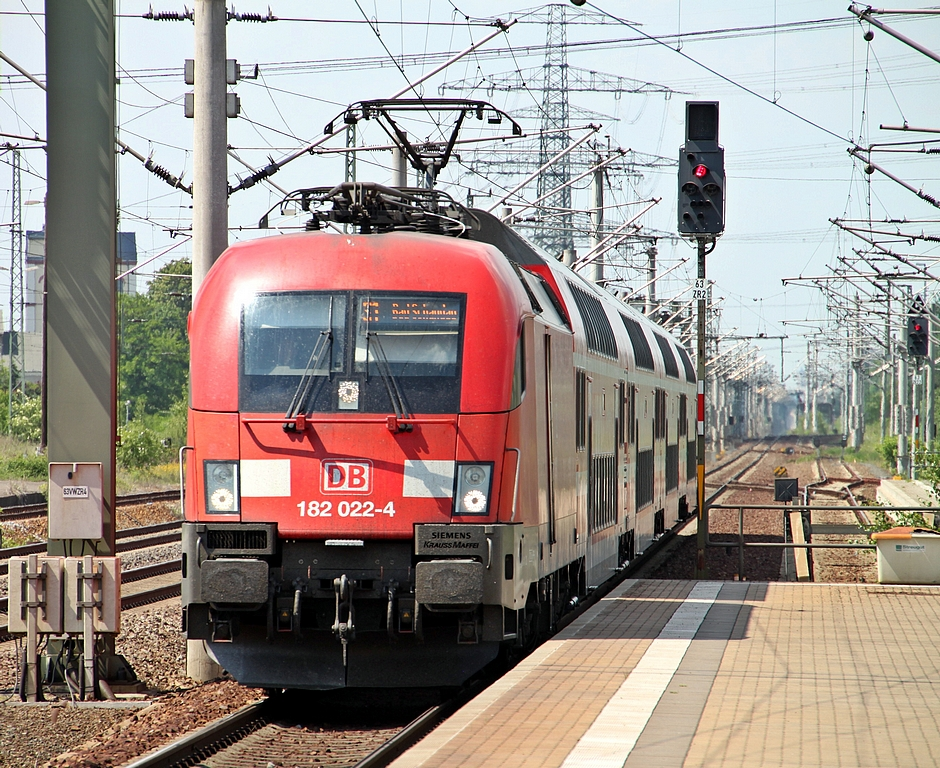
S 1 service in Heidenau, which has been hauled since December 2010 by a Siemens ES64U2 locomotive (EuroSprinter, class 182).

In the decision of March 2010, a contract was awarded to the current operator DB Regio, which will operate the S-Bahn until 2027. DB Regio announced that from December 2010 the locomotives used on the S 1 would be the more powerful Siemens ES64U2 locomotives (EuroSprinter, class 182), which would be acquired from DB Schenker. Also, a video surveillance system was to be retrofitted in the carriages.

Eisenbahngesellschaft Potsdam was to be awarded lots 2 and 3. However, the award procedure was criticised by the tender office of the state of Saxony and the tender for the two lots was voided. Eisenbahngesellschaft Potsdam also won the second tender. The operations of the Städtebahn Sachsen would be transferred.

== See also ==
- Rail transport in Germany
