= Freiberg (Sachs) station =

Railway station in Freiberg, Germany

Freiberg (Sachs)
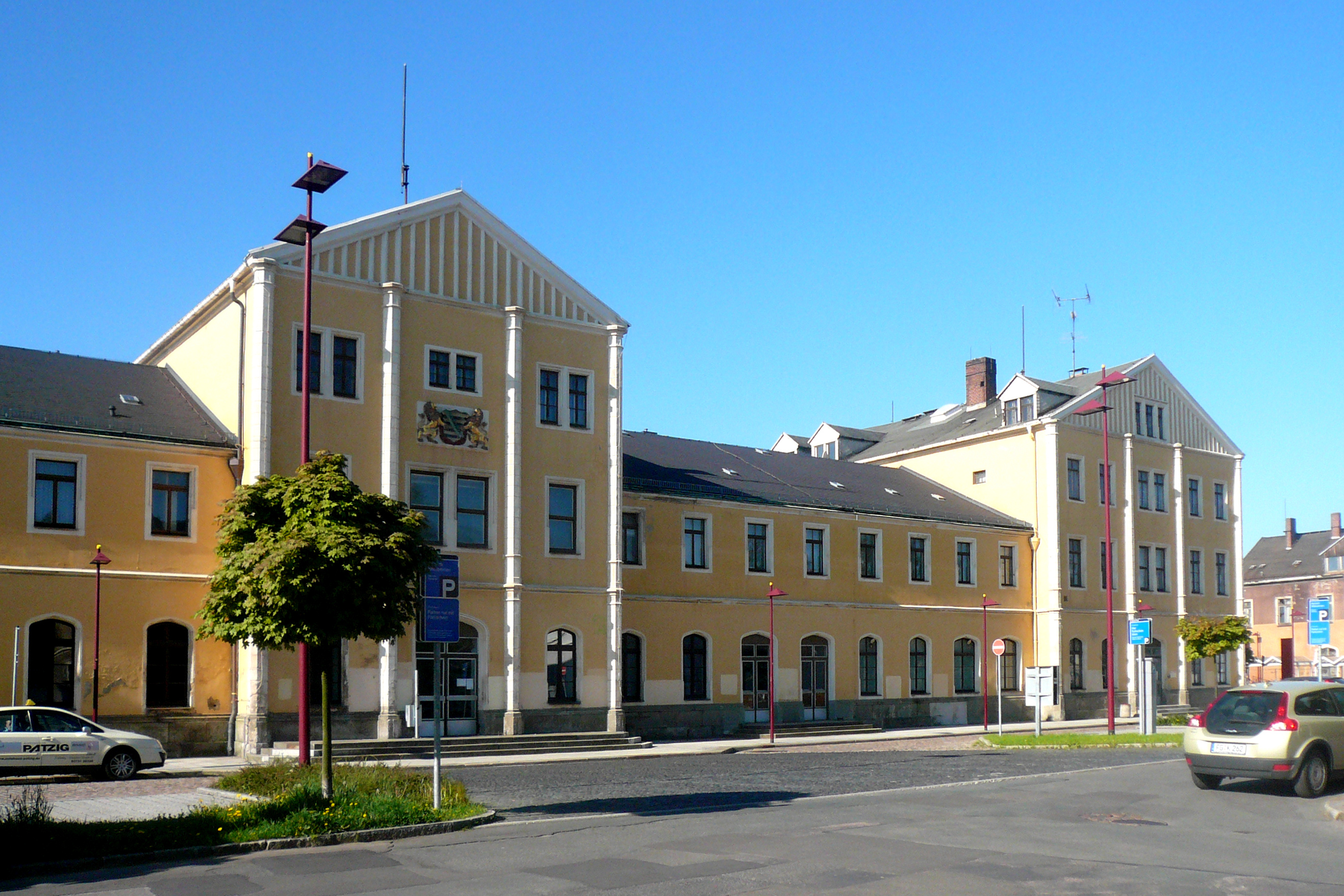
- Entrance building from the street (2008)

General information
- Location: Freiberg, Saxony, Germany
- Coordinates: 50°54′32″N 13°20′40″E
- Lines: Dresden–Werdau railway (km 40.01); Nossen–Moldava (km 23.97); former Freiberg–Halsbrücke (km 0.00)
- Platforms: 4
- Tracks: 4

Construction
- Accessible: Yes
- Architect: Eduard Heuchler
- Architectural style: Gothic revival

Other information
- Station code: 1891
- DS100 code: DFR
- IBNR: 8010115
- Category: 4
- Website: www.bahnhof.de

History
- Opened: 11 August 1862

Services
Preceding station	DB Fernverkehr	Following station
Chemnitz Hbf Terminus	IC 17	Dresden Hbf towards Rostock Hbf
Preceding station	Mitteldeutsche Regiobahn	Following station
Flöha towards Hof Hbf	RE 3	Tharandt towards Dresden Hbf
Kleinschirma towards Zwickau Hbf	RB 30	Muldenhütten towards Dresden Hbf
Preceding station	Dresden S-Bahn	Following station
Terminus	S 3	Muldenhütten towards Dresden Hbf
Location
- Location within Saxony Location within Germany Location within Europe

Freiberg (Sachs) station is a station on the Dresden–Werdau railway and the Nossen–Moldava railway in Freiberg in the German state of Saxony. Until 1995 it was also the start of the disused Freiberg–Halsbrücke railway.

== History ==
Freiberg (Sachs) station was opened with the opening of the extension of the Dresden–Tharandt railway to Freiberg on 11 August 1862. The station building, which was generous at the time, was designed by Freiberg architect Eduard Heuchler and included Gothic Revival elements. There is not much to see of these since reconstruction in the 20th century, but in its basic structure the station is still the building of 1862. Nearly seven years after its opening, the extension of the line to Chemnitz was opened on 1 March 1869 and Freiberg station became a through station. In the following decade, the Nossen–Moldava railway, which ran via Freiberg, was opened and, in 1890, operations began on the Freiberg–Halsbrücke railway, which had particular significance for freight transport. The sharp increase in passenger and freight traffic required the reconstruction of the station's rail facilities in 1900. The station's track layout was extended to the south, the low platforms between the tracks (which had access to only one track and were reached by passengers across the tracks from the central island platform, as was once common) were replaced with platforms connected by passenger tunnels and the level crossings over streets were replaced by underpasses.

According to the official timetable of 1944-45, three long-distance services stopped at Freiberg station.

Line	Route
2	Breslau−Dresden−Freiberg (Sachs)−Hof−Nuremberg−Regensburg−Munich
36	Breslau−Dresden−Freiberg (Sachs)−Hof−Nürnberg−Stuttgart
37	Breslau−Dresden−Freiberg (Sachs)−Hof−Würzburg−Mannheim−Saarbrücken

In 2011, the Freiburger IF Group acquired the station building and part of the station precinct from Deutsche Bahn for a six-figure purchase price. The intended renovation will include more retail space on the ground floor and office space upstairs.

== Rail services ==
Freiberg station used to be a stop for the Franken-Sachsen-Express from Dresden Hauptbahnhof to Nuremberg, this service was cancelled in December 2014. Today the station is served by regional and suburban services of Mitteldeutsche Regiobahn, DB Regio and the Freiberger Eisenbahn service to Holzhau. All services run every hour. The Regional-Express services meet on the half-hour and each connect to and from the FEG trains to and from Holzhau.

Since 9 December 2007, Freiberg has been connected by the Dresden S-Bahn to Dresden. The S-Bahn line S 3 runs only from Monday to Friday in the peak hour. Together with RB 30, it creates a 30-minute interval service between Freiberg and Dresden.

Line	Route	Frequency (min)	Operator
IC 17	Rostock Hbf – Neustrelitz – Berlin Hbf – BER Airport – Dresden Hbf – Freiberg – Chemnitz Hbf	Twice a day	DB Fernverkehr
RE 3	Dresden Hbf – Freiberg (Sachs) – Chemnitz Hbf – Zwickau (Sachs) Hbf – Plauen (Vogtl) ob Bf – Hof Hbf	60	Mitteldeutsche Regiobahn
RB 30	Dresden Hbf – Freiberg (Sachs) – Chemnitz Hbf – Zwickau (Sachs) Hbf	60	Mitteldeutsche Regiobahn
RB 83	Freiberg (Sachs) – Holzhau	60	Freiberger Eisenbahn
S 3	Dresden Hbf – Freiberg (Sachs)	Individual services	DB Regio Südost
