= Großer Zschand =

Coordinates: 50.8909°N 14.3090°E

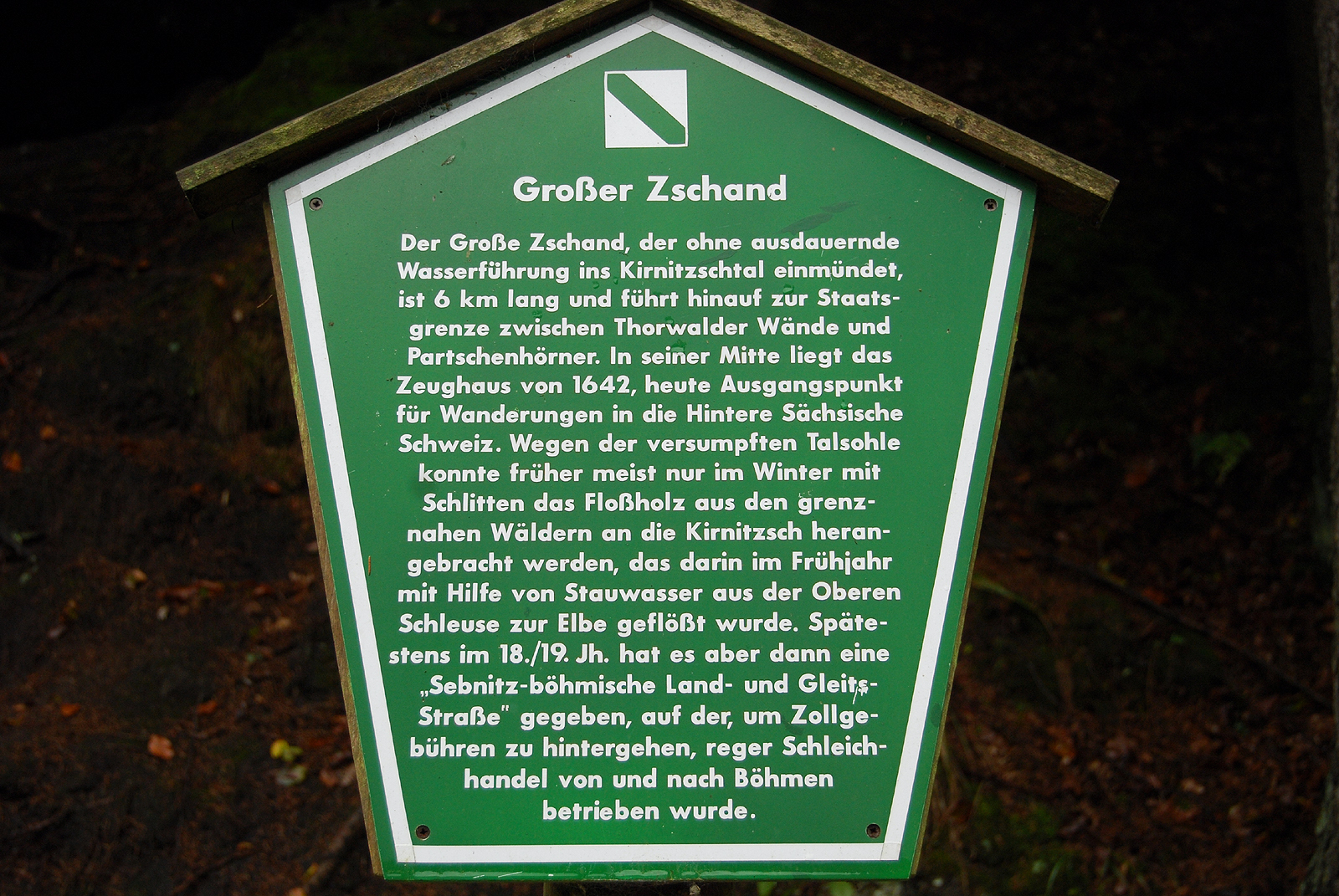
Information board about the Großer Zschand

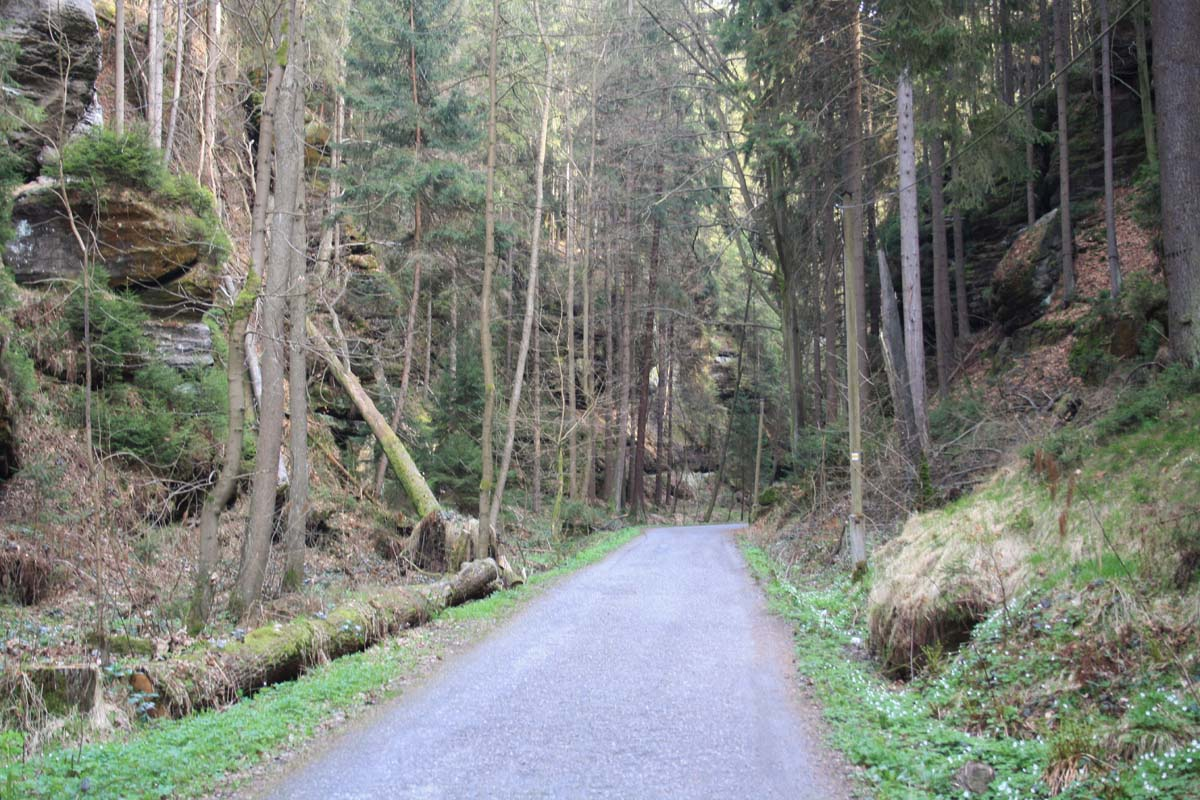
The Großer Zschand between Neumannmühle and Zeughaus

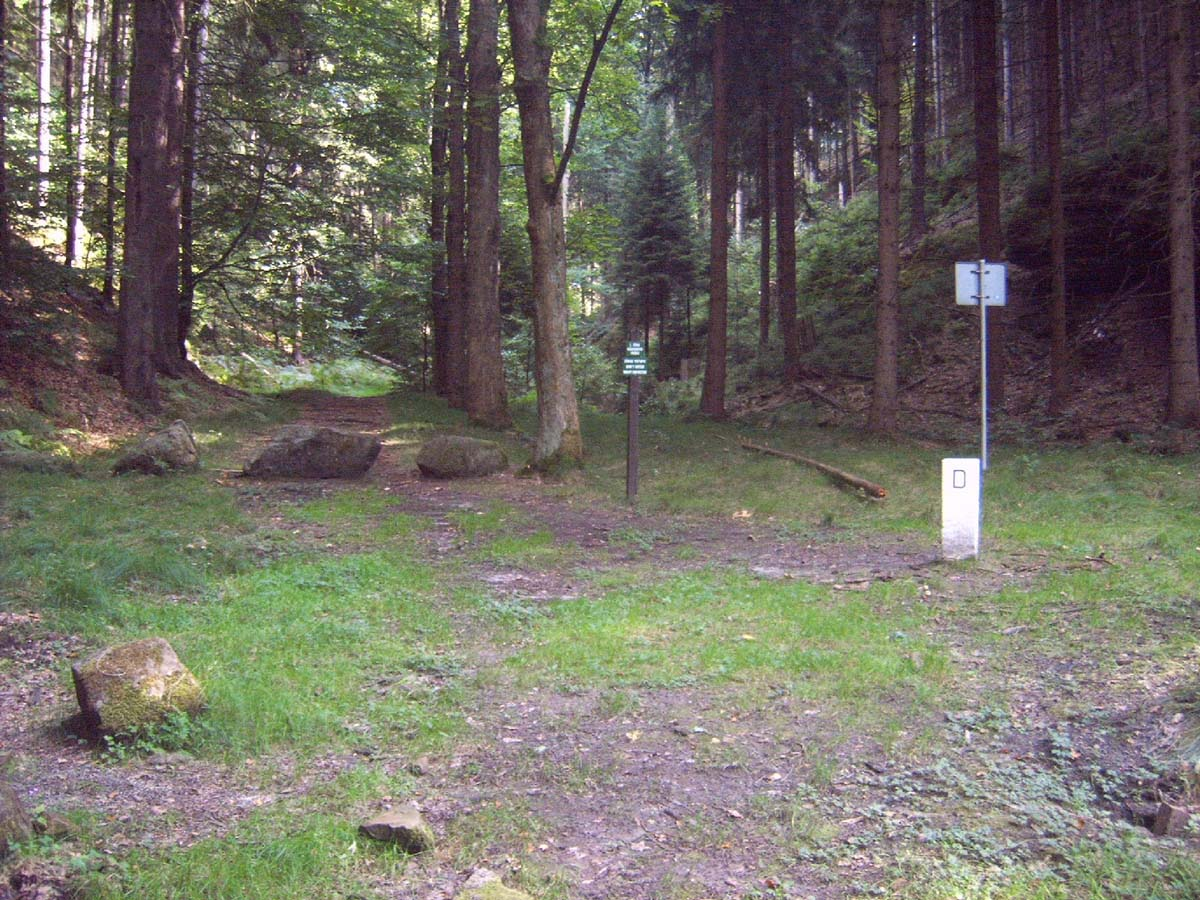
Border with the Czech Republic on the Großer Zschand

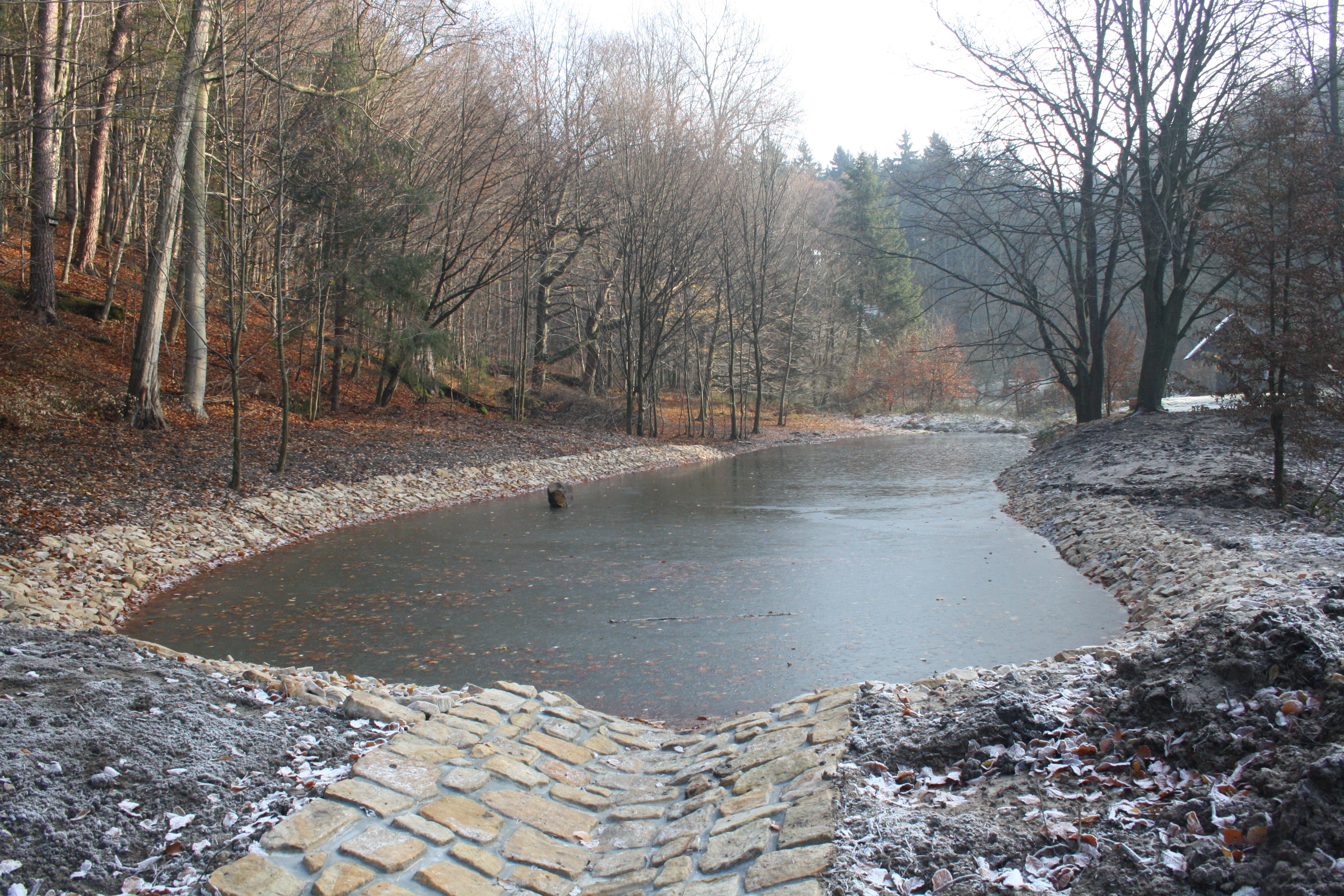
Pond by the old forester's lodge of Zeughaus

The Großer Zschand is the longest dry valley in Saxon Switzerland and runs for about 6 km from the Neumann Mill in the Kirnitzsch valley to the Roßmaulwiese meadown in Bohemian Switzerland. The Großer Zschand has no permanent watercourse; during times of snowmelt or after heavy rain, individual, locally limited watercourses and small marshy areas are formed.

== History ==
The Großer Zschand was used in the days before the development of Saxon Switzerland as a trade route between Bohemia and Saxony. At Zeughaus there used to be a customs post. Until the present Bundesstraße 172 from Schmilka via Hřensko to Děčín had been fully upgraded, the Großer Zschand was used as a transport link from Bad Schandau. Salt licks and bear pits are witness to hunting in the region.

An educational path, the Flößersteig ("Rafting Trail") begins at the Neumann Mill, running parallel to the Kirnitzsch river to Bad Schandau. In the northern part of the Großer Zschand, under a rock overhang, is a cave, closed with an iron door that acted as an explosive chamber until the end of the Second World War in order to block the valley at this point.

== Geology ==
The northern part of the Großer Zschand cuts like a gorge through the surrounding rock and has a moist, cool, cellar-like climate. The southern part, from the Zeughaus (armoury), is a broad valley with forested (spruce monoculture) slopes and their associated rock formations (Thorwalder Wände and Partschenhörner).

== Economic importance ==
As well as its historic importance as a trade route between Saxony and Bohemia and its use for hunting, the woods of the Großer Zschand supplied wood until the 1980s and logs were transported into the Kirnitzsch valley. In side ravines traces of old tracks for the transportation of wood are still visible today. The car park by the Neumann Mill was formerly used as a washout area (Ausschwemmplatz) for rafting on the Kirnitzsch river.

== National Park ==
The Großer Zschand is located entirely within the Saxon Switzerland National Park and, from the Zeughaus, in its strictly protected core zone. On the opening of the national park it was intended in future to open a pedestrian border crossing in the Großer Zschand into the Bohemian Switzerland National Park which was opened 10 years later. This has still not come to fruition. As part of the year 2000 trail concept in the national park the Großer Zschand was closed at the Hickelschlucht ravine and so a pedestrian border crossing is no longer possible.
