= Saxon Switzerland National Park =

National Park in Saxony, Germany

- Nationalpark Sächsische Schweiz
- IUCN category II (national park)
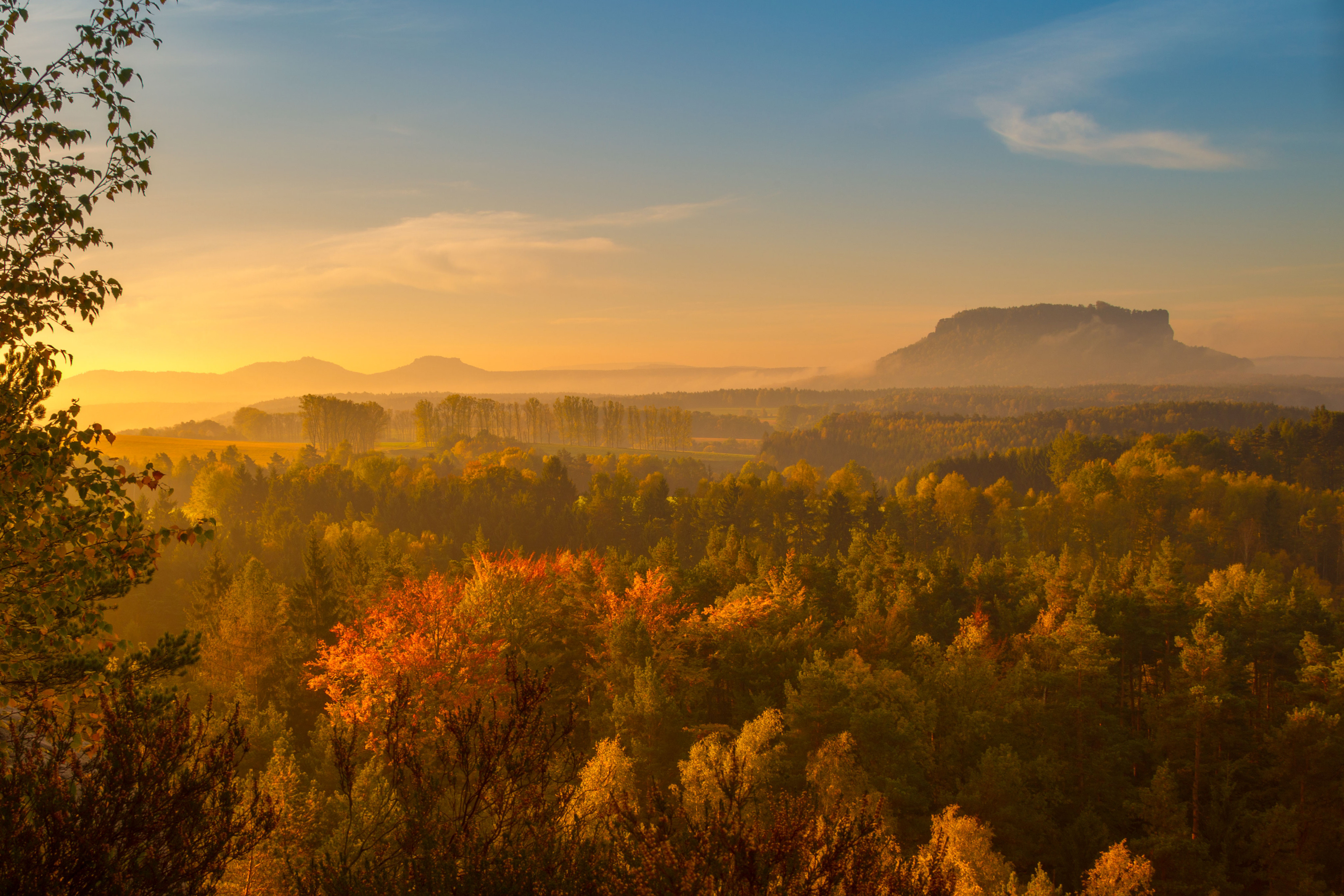
- View of the Lilienstein in Saxon Switzerland

- Location within Germany
- Location: Saxony, Germany
- Nearest city: Dresden
- Coordinates: 50°54′51″N 14°16′42″E
- Area: 93.5 km^{2} (36.1 sq mi)
- Established: 1990

Saxon Switzerland National Park (German: Nationalpark Sächsische Schweiz), is a national park in the German Free State of Saxony, near the Saxon capital Dresden. It covers two areas of 93.5 km^{2} (36.1 sq mi) in the heart of the German part of the Elbe Sandstone Mountains, which is often called (the) Saxon Switzerland (German: Sächsische Schweiz).

The national park adjoins Bohemian Switzerland National Park (Czech: České Švýcarsko) in the Czech Republic.

== Geography ==
=== Location ===
The National Park is situated in the centre of a natural area of almost 710 km^{2} (270 sq mi). This region, called Saxon Switzerland is cultivated by humans in many places. Smaller towns and villages such as Bad Schandau or Königstein in the district of Sächsische Schweiz are part of this region.

40% of the area of the National Park is covered almost completely by woodland. The status of National Park, which grants the highest natural protection in Germany, was attributed in 1990. The park lies – in two geographically separate areas – within the district of Sächsische Schweiz-Osterzgebirge.

=== Landscape ===
Saxon Switzerland is an intensively fissured and rocky canyon landscape. The highest peak of the National Park, the Großer Winterberg, is at 556 meters (1,824 feet) above sea level, and is only a short distance from the valley of the Elbe river at 110 to 120 meters (360 to 390 feet). It offers several different habitats and microclimate zones due to its strong vertical division. The National Park still hosts some forms of forest without human intervention, which is unusual in central Europe. The special forms of mountain forest and gorge forest are endangered in Europe generally. Because of the sabulous soil and fissures, many places in this area are drier than normal for the temperate zone.

=== Western region ===
This region includes the Bastei area, the Lilienstein and the Polenz valley. In the west it is bordered by Wehlen and Lohmen, in the north by Lohmen and Hohnstein, in the east by Hohnstein and Goßdorf and in the south by Porschdorf, Rathen and Wehlen. The municipality of Waitzdorf lies entirely within the western region. Important peaks are the Lilienstein (415 m), the Bastei (305 m), the Hockstein and the Brand (317 m). The Grünbach and the associated lake of Amselsee and the Polenz are the only noteworthy bodies of water.

=== Eastern region ===
The eastern region includes the area of the Schrammsteine rocks, the Großer Winterberg mountain, the Großer Zschand valley and the hinterland of Saxon Switzerland (Hinterer Sächsischen Schweiz). To the west it is bordered by Bad Schandau and Altendorf and to the north by Altendorf, Ottendorf and Hinterhermsdorf. To the east and south it is bordered by the Bohemian Switzerland National Park. From Schmilka to Bad Schandau the Elbe forms the southern boundary of this region. Important peaks are the Großer Winterberg (556 m), the Kuhstall (337 m) and the Raumberg (459 m). The Kirnitzsch is the only noteworthy body of water.

== Tourism and recreation ==
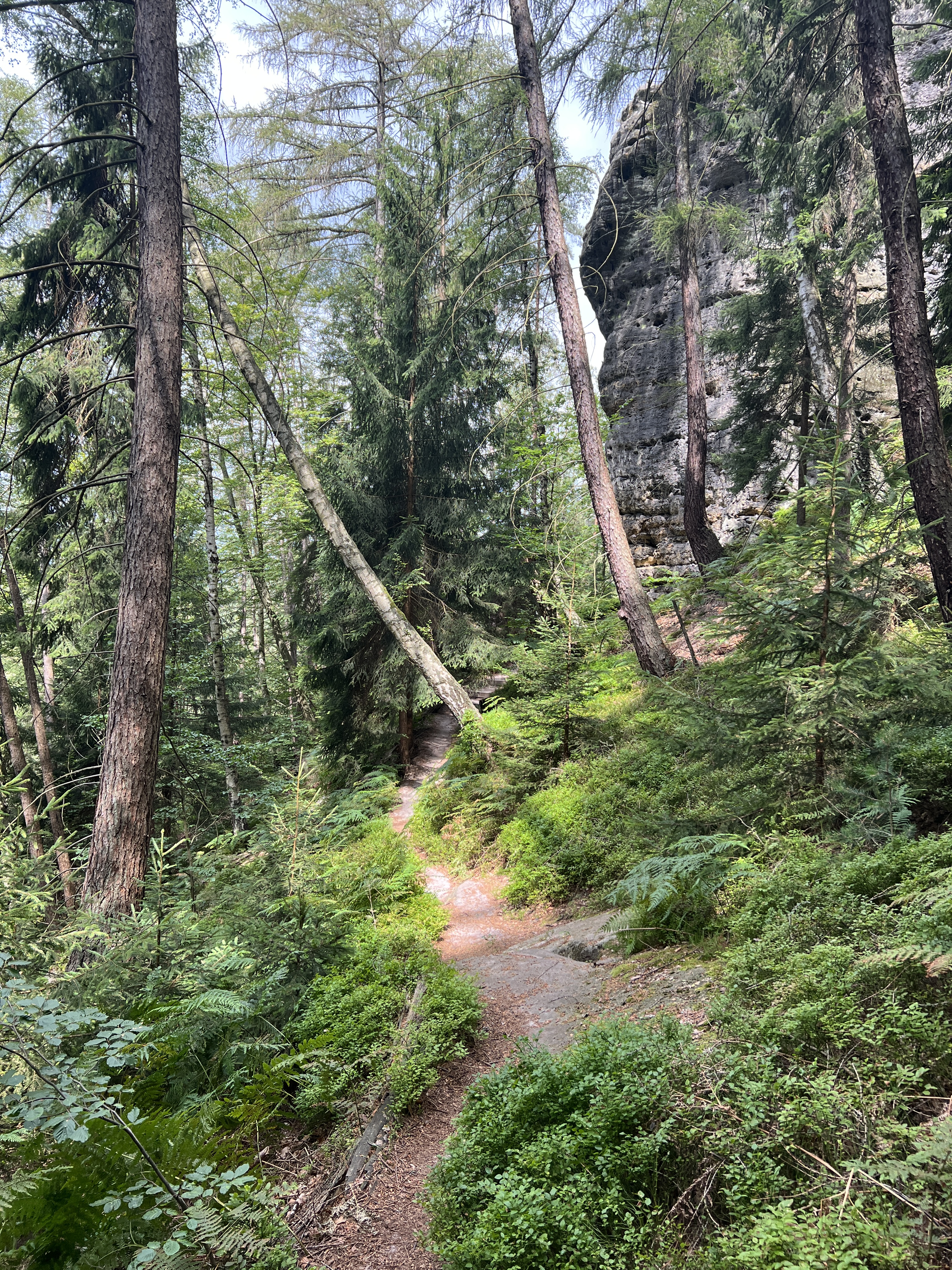
Typical hiking trail in the area

The definition of national Park is, in some cases, in conflict with tourism and recreation. One objective is to raise the inviolate area to 75%, which means limiting the areas of hiking and climbing.

The development of the network of paths in today's national park took place in the first half of the 19th century and completed at the beginning of the 20th century. The historical route guides illustrate it thoroughly (e.g., Meinhold's route guide). The first hiking restrictions were declared as early as in the 1980s (Thorwalder Wände ridge path). Today the National Park has a marked network of 400 km of hiking trails, numerous mountain restaurants, and some 50 km of cycling trails. It is compulsory to use marked routes in the National Park. Though visitors may use all paths outside the core zone, only marked trails are allowed within the core zone.

The painter's way

The 'Painters' Trail' (Malersweg in German) is a 116 km long hiking trail that starts in the city of Pirna and follows the Elbe eastwards until Schmilka, where it crosses the river loops back to Pirna. It represents only a small part of the park area, but due to its beauty and being a well-developed trail, most visitors prefer it for hiking. The Bastei bridge is the first view of the Valley for many visitors and is extensively photographed and documented.

=== Rock climbing ===
The peculiar form of the sandstone cliffs in Saxon Switzerland national park attracts crowds of climbers every year. However, since these cliffs are sandstone, it is important to treat them with caution.

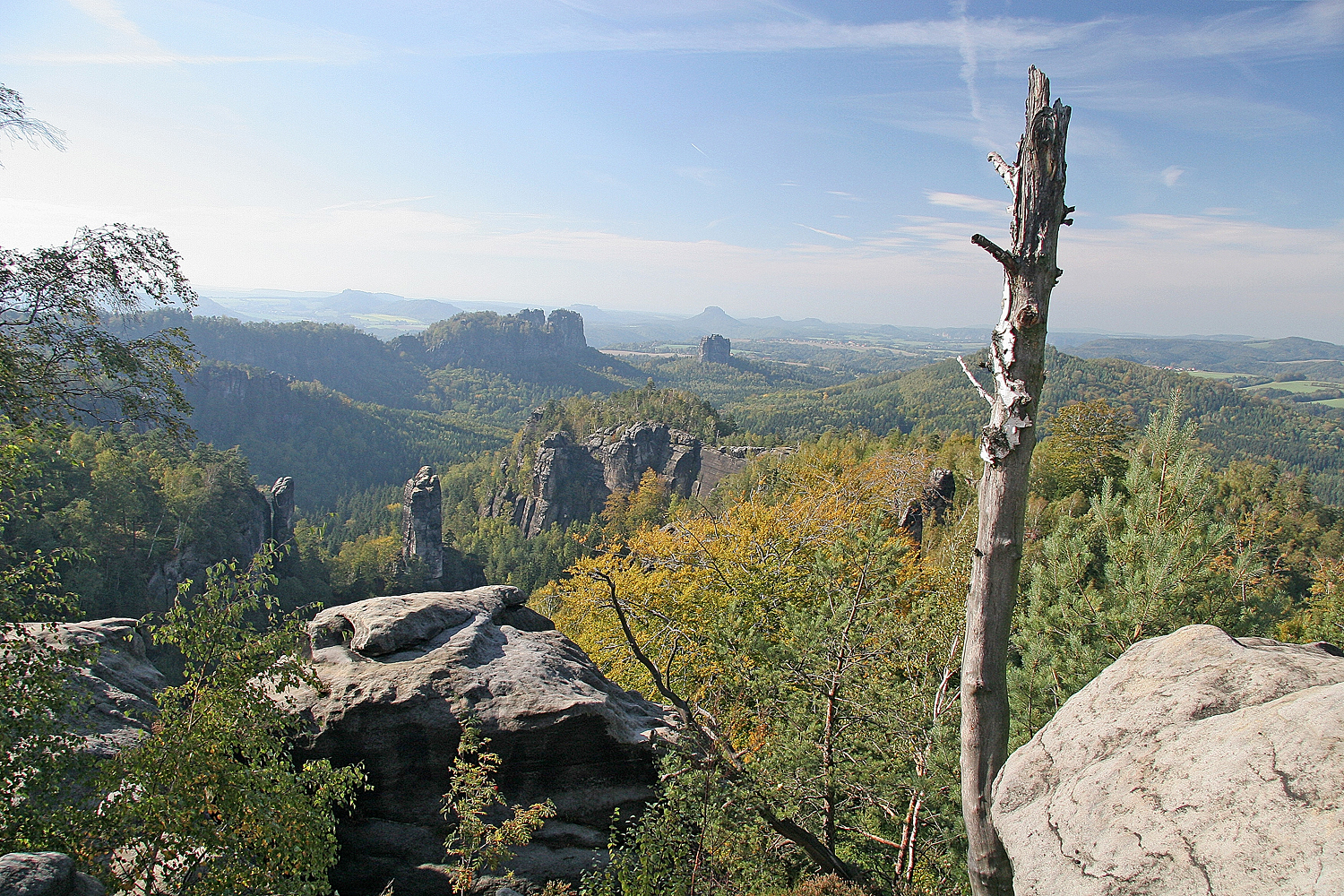
The view of Saxon Switzerland national park landscape and sandstone cliffs from Carolafelsen

The following rules, introduced at the beginning of the 20th century, are in place to preserve the national park sandstone:

1. Visitors are not permitted to climb when the rock is wet or crumbling.
2. Ropes are only allowed for safety purposes and abseiling.
3. Metal safety equipment, such as chock-stones and solid rings, are forbidden.
4. Visitors are not allowed to use chemical aids such as magnesia.
5. The rock surface must not be modified – except to attach retaining rings on first ascents.

== Information posts ==
- National Park Headquarters
  - National Park Centre in Bad Schandau
  - National Park Office in Bad Schandau
- Information posts
  - Schweizerhaus on the Bastei
  - Amselfall mountain hut
  - Log cabin on the Brand
  - Eishaus on the Großer Winterberg
  - Armoury in the Großer Zschand
  - Haus Beize and Waldhusche in Hinterhermsdorf

== Points of interest ==
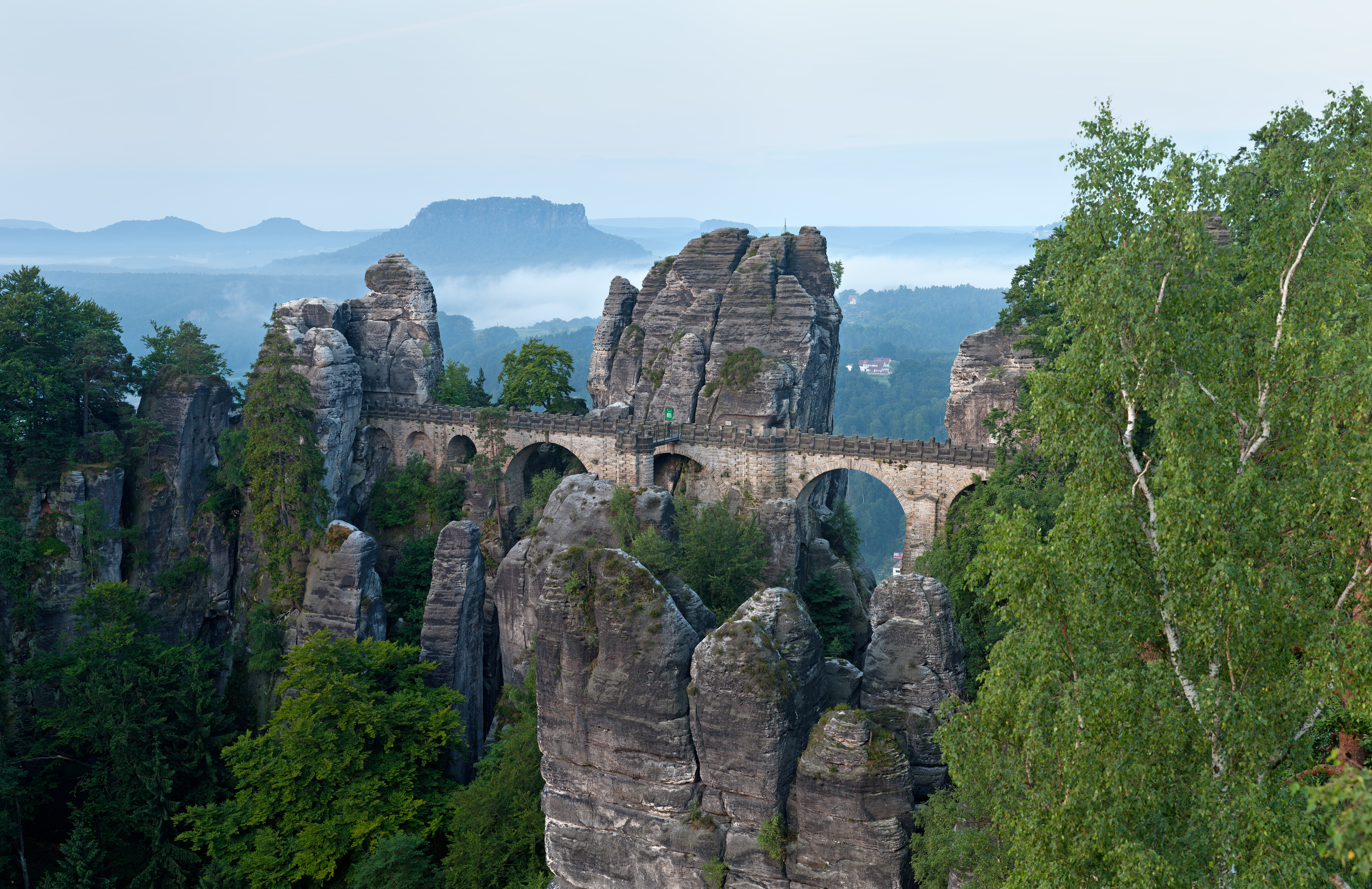
Bastei Bridge

- Pflanzengarten Bad Schandau, a regional botanical garden
- Bastei Bridge

== See also ==
- Bohemian Switzerland
