= Winterstein =

Winterstein may refer to:

== People with surname ==
- Antonio Winterstein (born 1988), professional rugby league footballer for the North Queensland Cowboys of the NRL
- Claudia Winterstein (born 1950), German politician
- Eduard von Winterstein (1871–1961), Austrian film actor
- Frank Winterstein (born 1986) Australian-Samoan professional rugby union footballer
- Taylor Winterstein (born 1989), Australian-Samoan online influencer
- Willy Winterstein (1895–1965), Austrian cinematographer
- Hedwig Pauly-Winterstein (1866–1965), German stage and film actress
- Baroness Elisabeth of Wangenheim-Winterstein (1912–2010), wife of Charles Augustus, Hereditary Grand Duke of Saxe-Weimar-Eisenach

== Geography ==
- Winterstein (Saxon Switzerland), an isolated, elongated rock massif in the hinterland of Saxon Switzerland in East Germany
- Winterstein (Taunus), a prominent hill spur in the Taunus mountain of Germany
