= Winterstein (Saxon Switzerland) =

- Hinteres Raubschloss
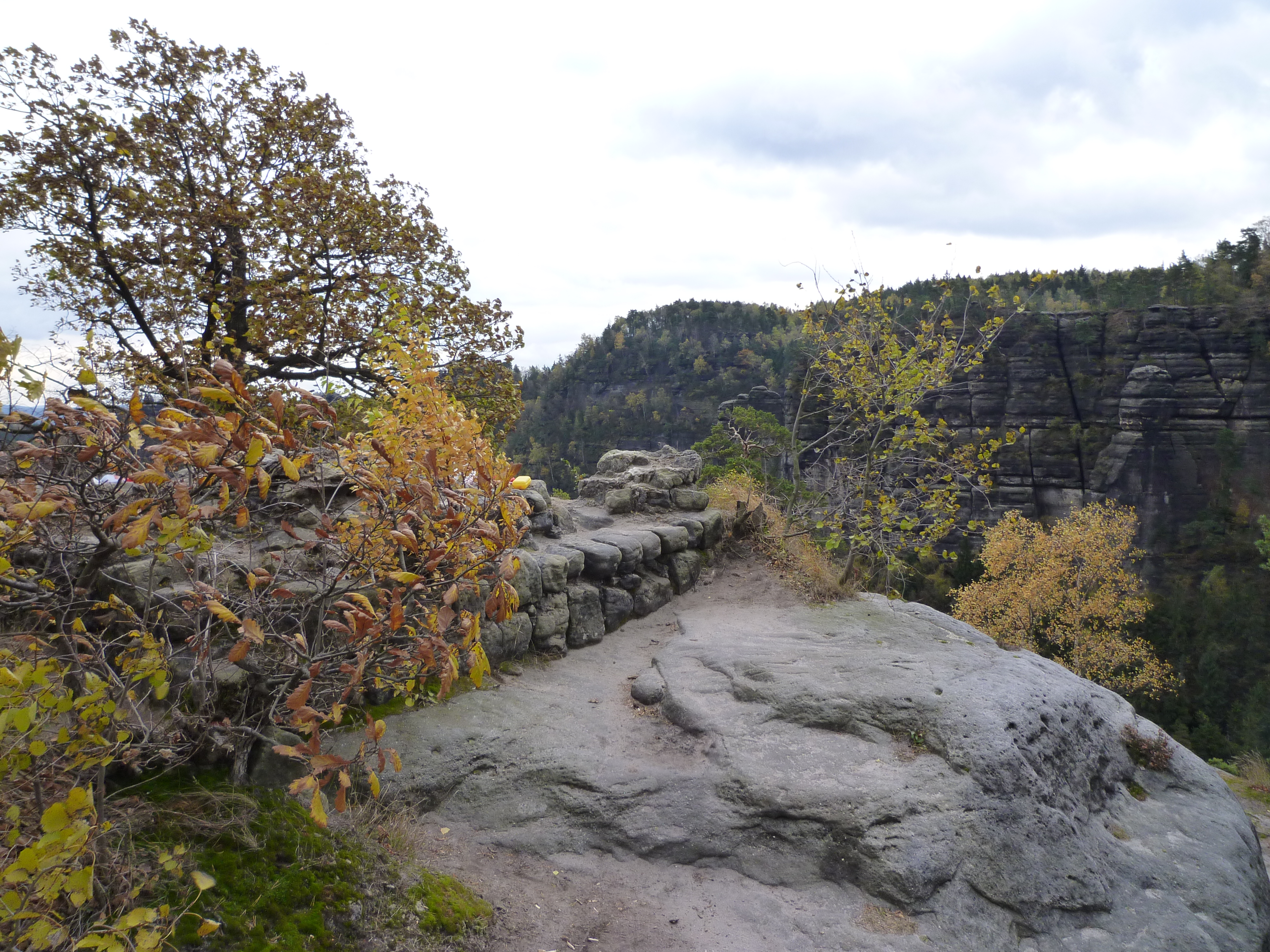
- Foundations of the ruined castle on the Winterstein

Highest point
- Elevation: 390 m above sea level (HN) (1,279.5 ft)
- Coordinates: 50°54′38″N 14°16′48″E

Geography
- Location within Saxony
- Location: Saxony
- Parent range: Elbe Sandstone Mountains

Geology
- Mountain type: rock massif
- Rock type: Sandstone

The Winterstein, also called the Hinteres Raubschloss, is an isolated, elongated rock massif in the hinterland of Saxon Switzerland in East Germany. On the summit there was once a medieval castle, also called Winterstein, of which remains such as rebates for timber beams, hewn-out steps and cisterns are still visible.

== Location and area ==
The Winterstein is located in the almost unpopulated hinterland of Saxon Switzerland above the dry valley of the Großer Zschand with the crags of the Bärfangwänden in front of it. A few kilometres to the east along the Großer Zschand is the Zeughaus ("armoury"). West of the Winterstein runs the Kleiner Zschand valley, overshadowed by the massif of the Großer Winterberg. Immediately in front of the rock massif to the south is the free-standing climbing pinnacle of Wintersteinwächter.

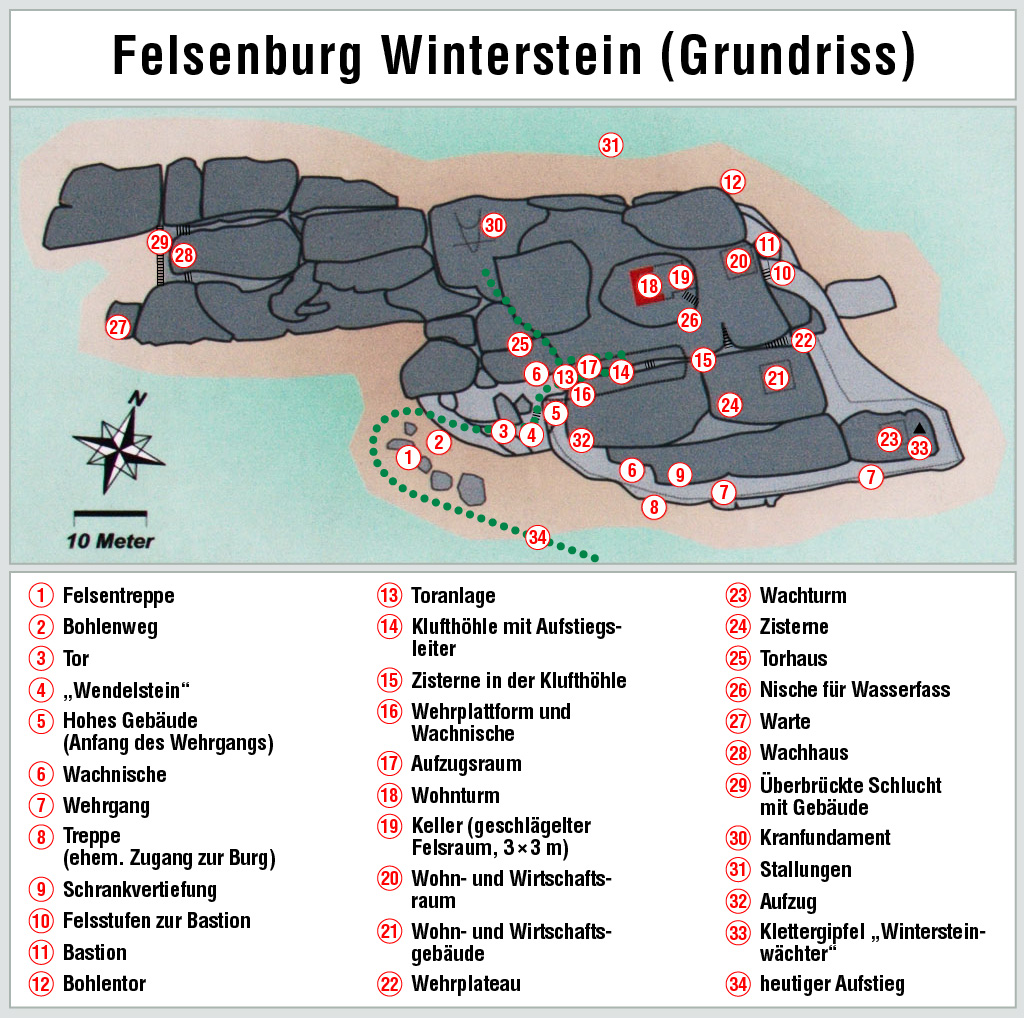
Map of the Winterstein

== Sources ==
- Hermann Lemme, Gerhard Engelmann: Zwischen Hinterhermsdorf und den Zschirnsteinen. Werte der deutschen Heimat series, Vol. 2, Akademie-Verlag, Berlin 1959
- Matthias Mau: Die Felsenburg Winterstein, Stiegenbuchverlag, 2008
- Anne Müller, Matthias Weinhold: Felsenburgen der Sächsischen Schweiz. Neurathen – Winterstein – Arnstein. Reihe Burgen, Schlösser und Wehrbauten in Mitteleuropa Band 23, Verlag Schnell und Steiner, Regensburg 2010, ISBN 978-3-7954-2303-2
