= Bad Schandau Elevator =

Passenger truss-tower elevator built in 1904 at Bad Schandau, Saxony, Germany

Coordinates: 50°55′00″N 14°09′40″E

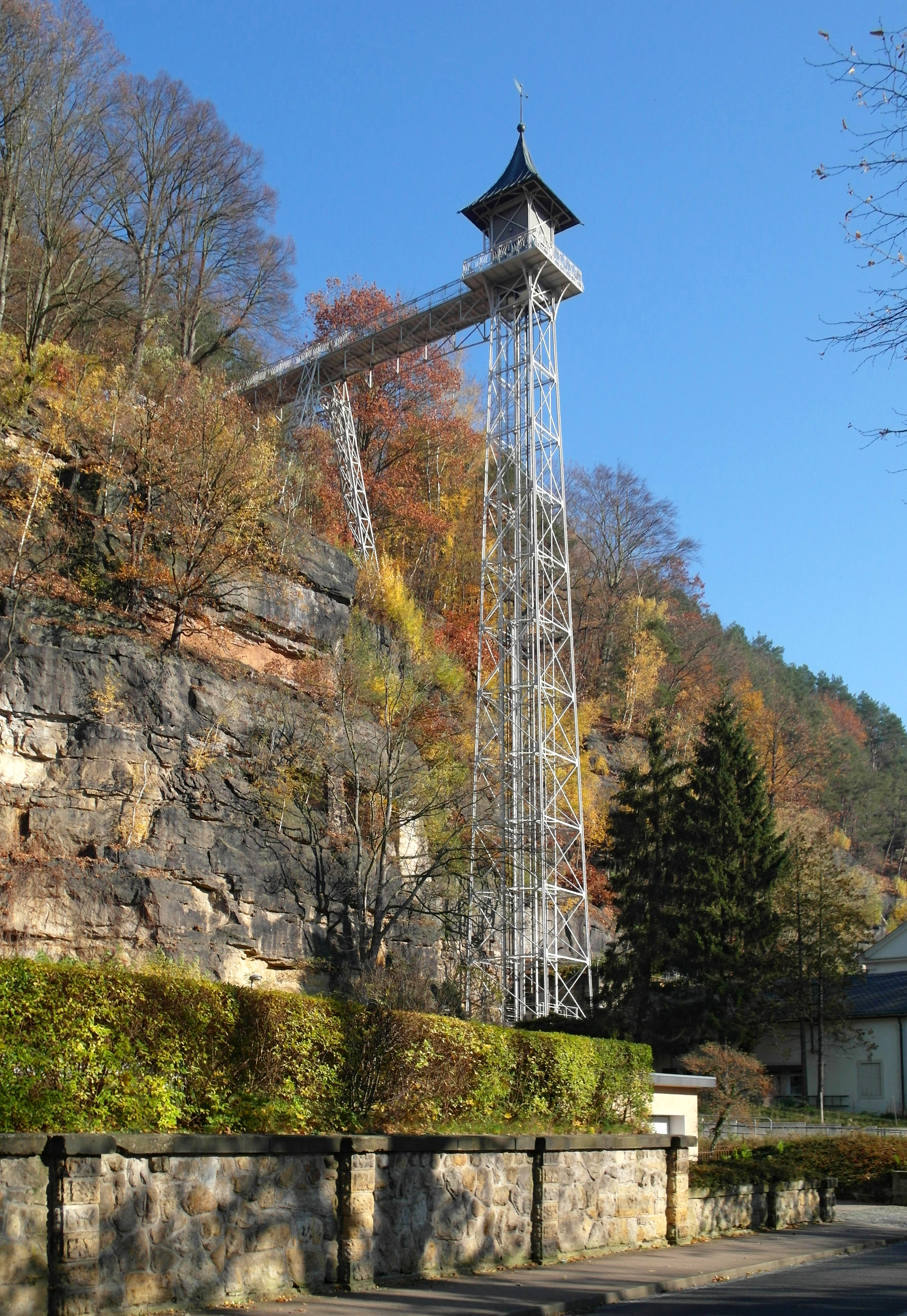
View of the elevator

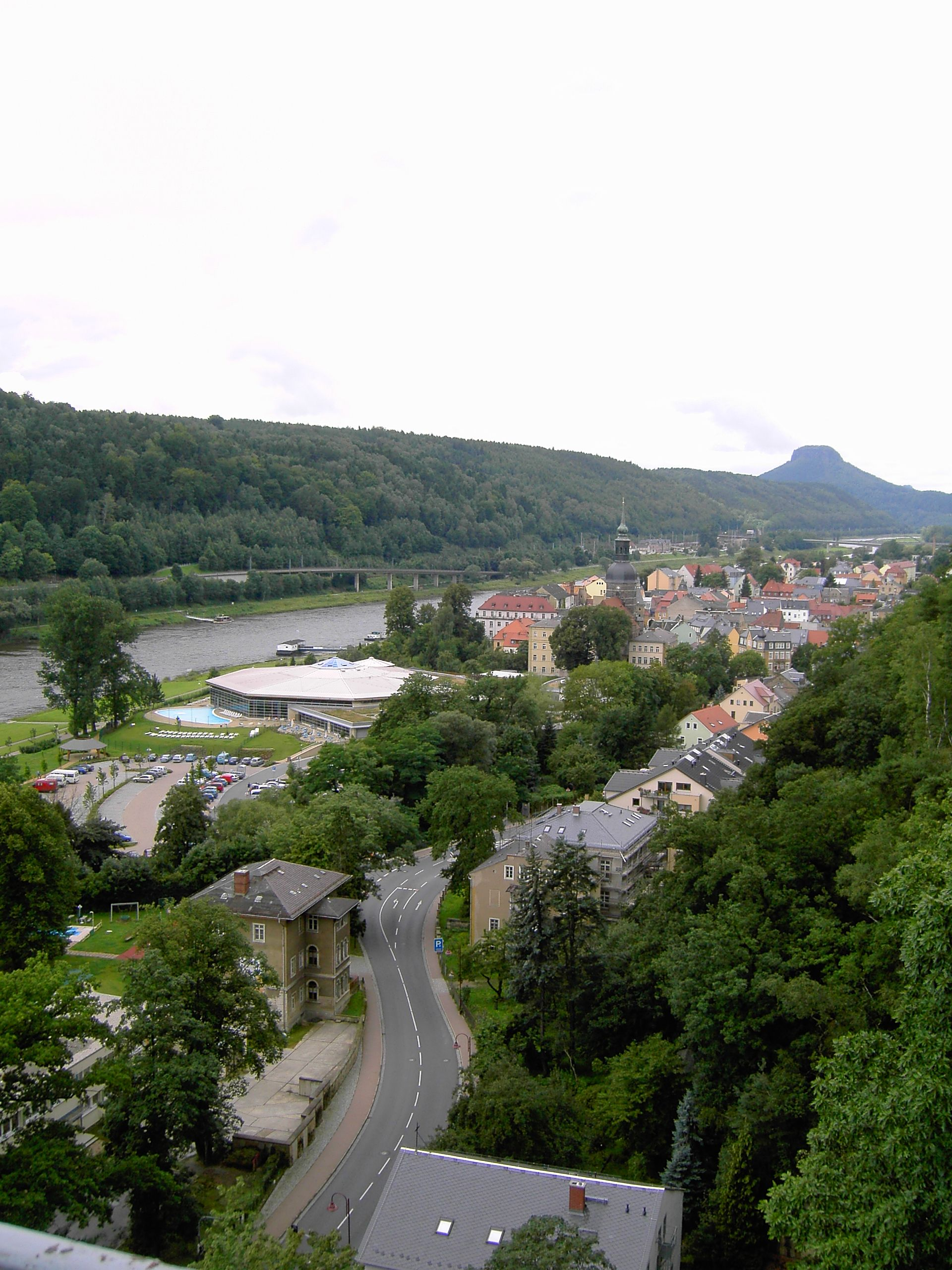
Bad Schandau as seen from the elevator

The Bad Schandau Elevator is a passenger truss-tower elevator built in 1904 at Bad Schandau, a spa town in Saxony, Germany. The height of the elevator is 52.6 metres (173 ft), in an art nouveau-style steel framework tower, which has a diameter of 5.2 metres (17 ft) at the ground and at the door such of 2.5 metres (8.2 ft). On the way upward it overcomes a difference in height of 47.76 metres (156.7 ft). It functions as an observation tower.

== Overview ==
The elevator is driven by an electric motor, with the electricity generated by the Lichtenhain Waterfall. During the winter and emergencies, electricity was originally provided by a battery.

In 1921 the drive of the Bad Schandau Elevator was changed to three-phase alternating current; a crank handle was left for emergency operation. During World War I, the facility was shut down. In 1950 a driving disk hoisting engine was introduced. In 1961 two additional anchoring wires were attached and in 1978 a new control. In the years 1989-1990 the plant, which was put under monument protection in 1954, was reconditioned.

The elevator is visible in some scenes of Wes Anderson's 2013 film The Grand Budapest Hotel.
