= Pflanzengarten Bad Schandau =

Botanical garden in Saxony, Germany

Coordinates: 50.9019°N 14.1863°E

The Pflanzengarten Bad Schandau (6100 m^{2}) is a botanical garden located in the Saxon Switzerland National Park on the Kirnitzschtalstraße (Kirnitzsch valley), Bad Schandau, Saxony, Germany. It is open daily from April to October.

The garden opened in 1902 as the Regionalbotanischer Garten Sachsens (Saxon Regional Botanical Garden), with a goal of preserving local plants, including rare poisonous and medicinal plants. As of 2002, it contained nearly 1000 taxa from cool and moist climates around the world, but focuses on plants of the Saxon Switzerland area, including 323 species from the area, of which about 80 species were protected or on Saxony's Red List.

== Things to do in Bad Schandau ==
There's an abundance of things to see and do throughout the Bad Schandau area, alongside the gardens, including:

- The Spa Park
- Kirnitzchtal Railway
- St. John's Church
- The Sendigbrunnen Fountain
- Schomburg Castle Ruins
- Ostrau Sendigvillen Wooden Villas
- Elbe Sandstone Mountains Museum (open from February to December)
- High-top Viewing Platform (which can be accessed via a historic passenger elevator), providing views of the town.
- Botanical Gardens
- Library
- National Park Centre
- City & Guided Tours

== Gastronomy ==
The areas gastronomy is very much focused on the use of seasonal and regional ingredients, with restaurants, pubs, and traditional taverns. There are plenty of indoor and in-nature options.

== See also ==
- List of botanical gardens in Germany
