= Obere Schleuse =

Coordinates: 50°54′35.48″N 14°23′15.84″E

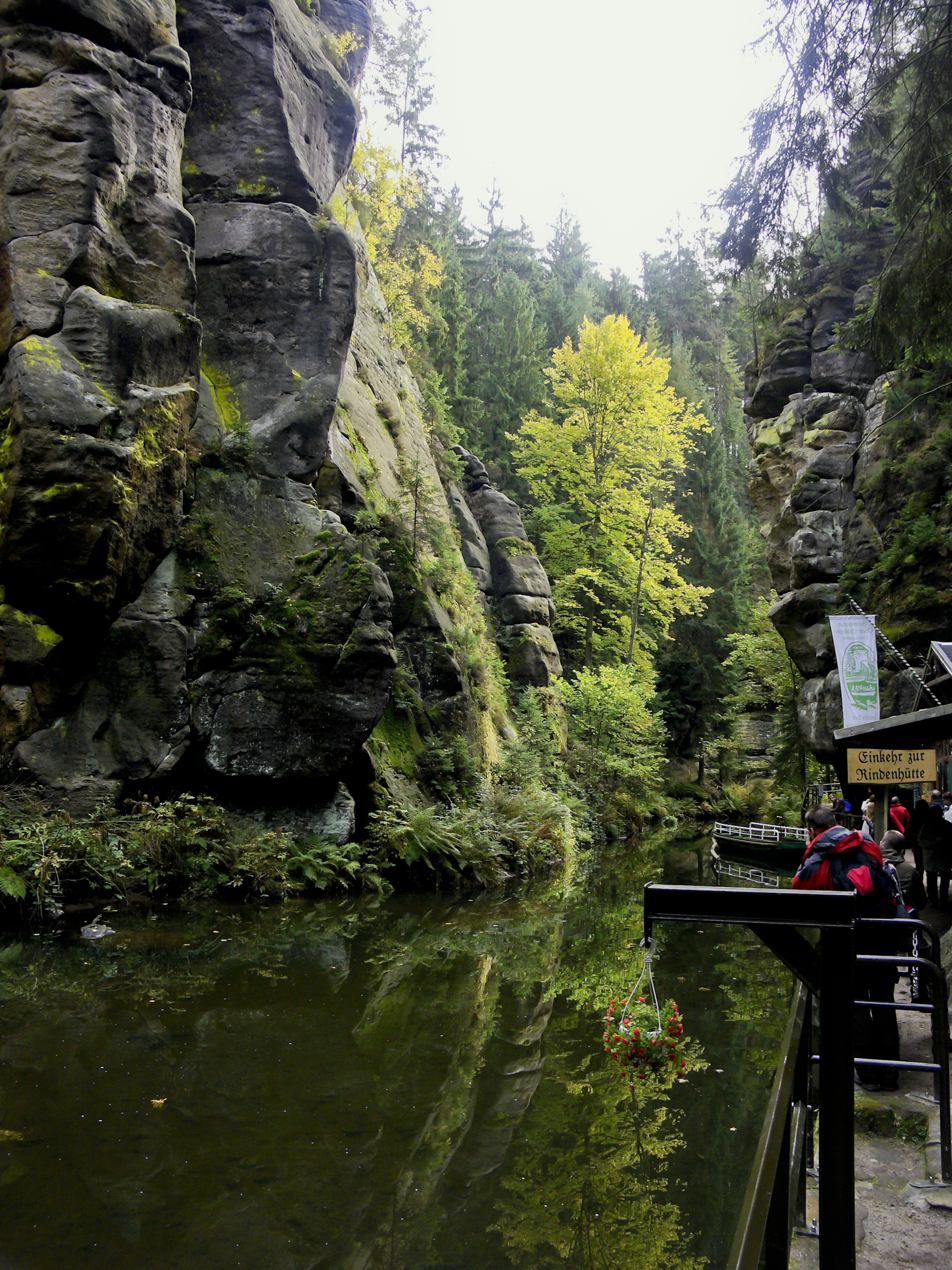
The boat station on the Obere Schleuse

The Obere Schleuse in Hinterhermsdorf is a barrage system on the German-Czech border river of Kirnitzsch and impounds the water over a length of 700 metres. It was originally a facility for timber rafting. There are boat rides on the reservoir today during the summer months. At the boat landing point the water depth is 1 metre; by the dam it is 4 metres. The water temperature rarely climbs above 8 °C in summer. In the winter months, when there are no boat trips, the water is not impounded and the Kirnitzsch flows in its original river bed.

== History ==
As early as the 16th century the Kirnitzsch was being used for the rafting of timber. The growing consumption of timber meant that the Kirnitzsch had to be upgraded into a timber rafting river. In order to ensure the necessary quantity of water was available, rafting ponds and barrages were built. These included the Obere and Niedere Schleuse ("Upper and Lower Locks"), which have the largest dams in Saxon Switzerland.

In 1567, on the direction of Elector August of Saxony, a wooden dam was built. This served to collect logs from the hinterland of Saxon Switzerland and enable their assembly into rafts. In the years 1816/17 this wooden structure was replaced by a stone dam. By opening the gates in the dam wall a flume of water was released that enabled the rafting of logs up to 11 metres long down to the River Elbe. Using the rafter's footpath or Flößersteig, which ran alongside the Kirnitzsch, rafters could accompany the logs. In 1931 a 7-metre-high dam was built that is protected nowadays as an industrial monument. The reservoir of the Obere Schleuse is between 80 centimetres (at the boat station) and 4 metres (at the dam) deep.

The Obere Schleuse has been used by the Saxonia Mountain Club (Gebirgsverein Saxonia) for boating since 1879. On 25 May 1879, with the support of Senior Forester (Oberförster) Schlegel and the population of Hinterhermsdorf, the first boat was launched on the Obere Schleuse. It was a 16 hundredweight oak boat named the "Saxonia". With the advent of boating the number of visitors soared. The following year a second boat was added and, in 1881, the mountain club had a hut built and the boatman was able to offer summer-fresh ("Sommerfrischlern") food and drink. In 1894 boating attracted over 10,000 guests.

During the First and Second World Wars, boating operations were cancelled. The mountain club were responsible for the dam and reservoir before the Second World War but this responsibility was taken over in 1952 by the parish of Hinterhermsdorf. But timber rafting on the Kirnitzsch continued until 1964. Only then did the Obere Schleuse become exclusively used for tourism. Boat trips, lasting roughly 20 minutes long, are possible every year from Easter to the end of October. Passengers learn about the Schleuse during the boat trip as well about local animals and plants. In 2009 these boat trips carried 55,000 passengers.

== Flora ==
The shady, cool and moist gorge is characterised by dark spruce forest and some of the spruce trees are very tall and old. One of Germany's tallest trees, a 59.30 m Norway spruce can be found there. In addition, numerous ferns, mosses and lichens grow here. By contrast, open heathland and pine forest grow on the dry, sunny heights above the valley.

== See also ==
- Kirnitzsch

== Sources ==
- Karl Möckel: 100 Jahre Bootsfahrt Obere Schleuse, Klamm: 1879 - 1979, Hinterhermsdorf 1979
- Joachim Wünsch: Die Obere Schleuse bei Hinterhermsdorf. in: Sächsische Heimatblätter Heft 6/1960, pp. 375-378
