= Krippenbach =

River in Germany

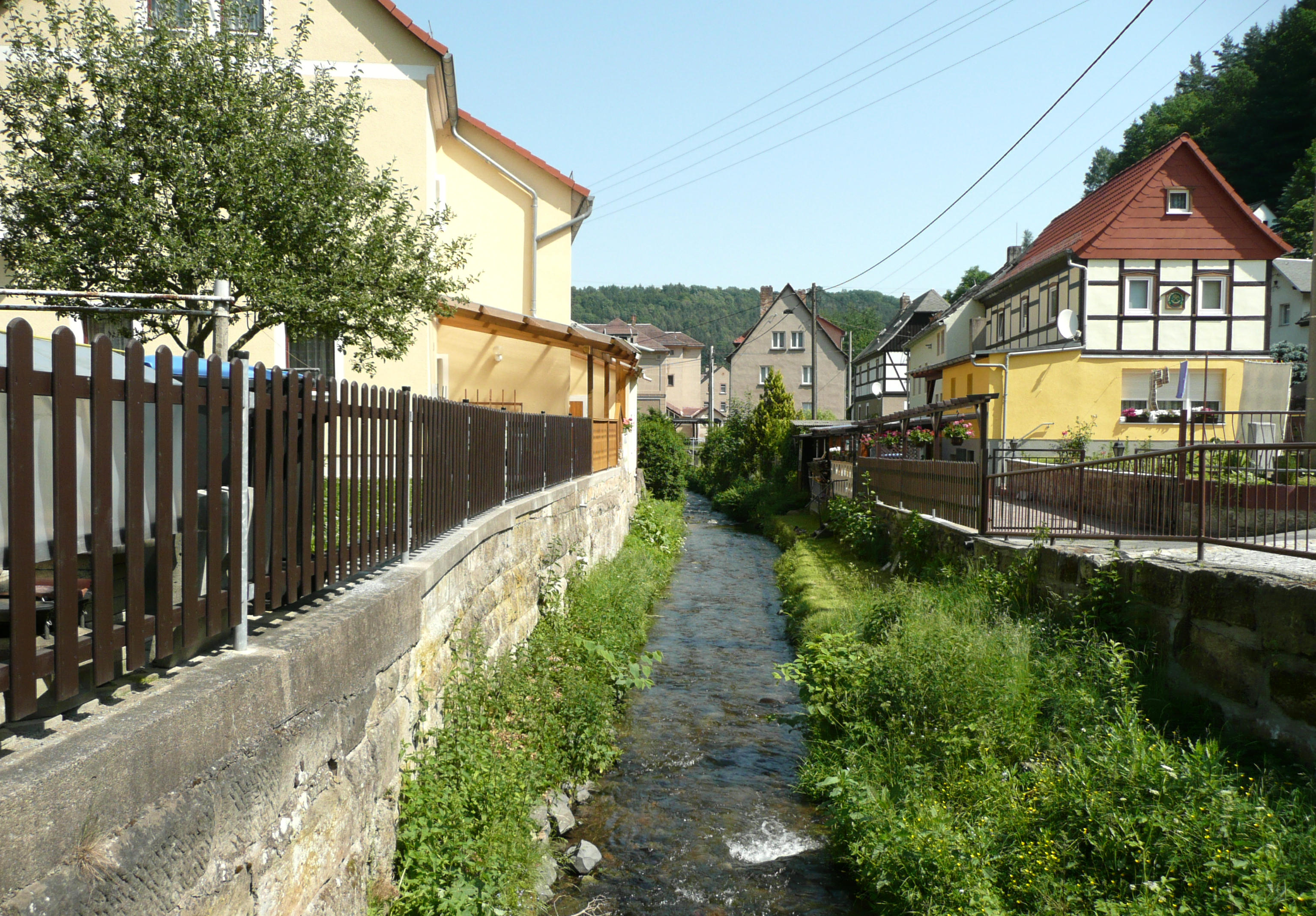

Location
- Country: Germany
- States: Saxony

Physical characteristics
- Mouth
  - location: Elbe
  - coordinates: 50°54′47″N 14°09′59″E

Basin features
- Progression: Elbe→ North Sea

The Krippenbach is a small river of Saxony, Germany. It is a left tributary of the Elbe, which it joins in Krippen, near Bad Schandau. It has an elevation of 136 meters. Its name comes from Krippen, a small fishing hamlet on the river. It was used to power mills in hamlets and villages for centuries. A moller (miller) was first mentioned in a document in Krippen in 1474.

== See also ==
- List of rivers of Saxony
