= Bad Schandau =

Bad Schandau Žandow (Upper Sorbian)
- Town
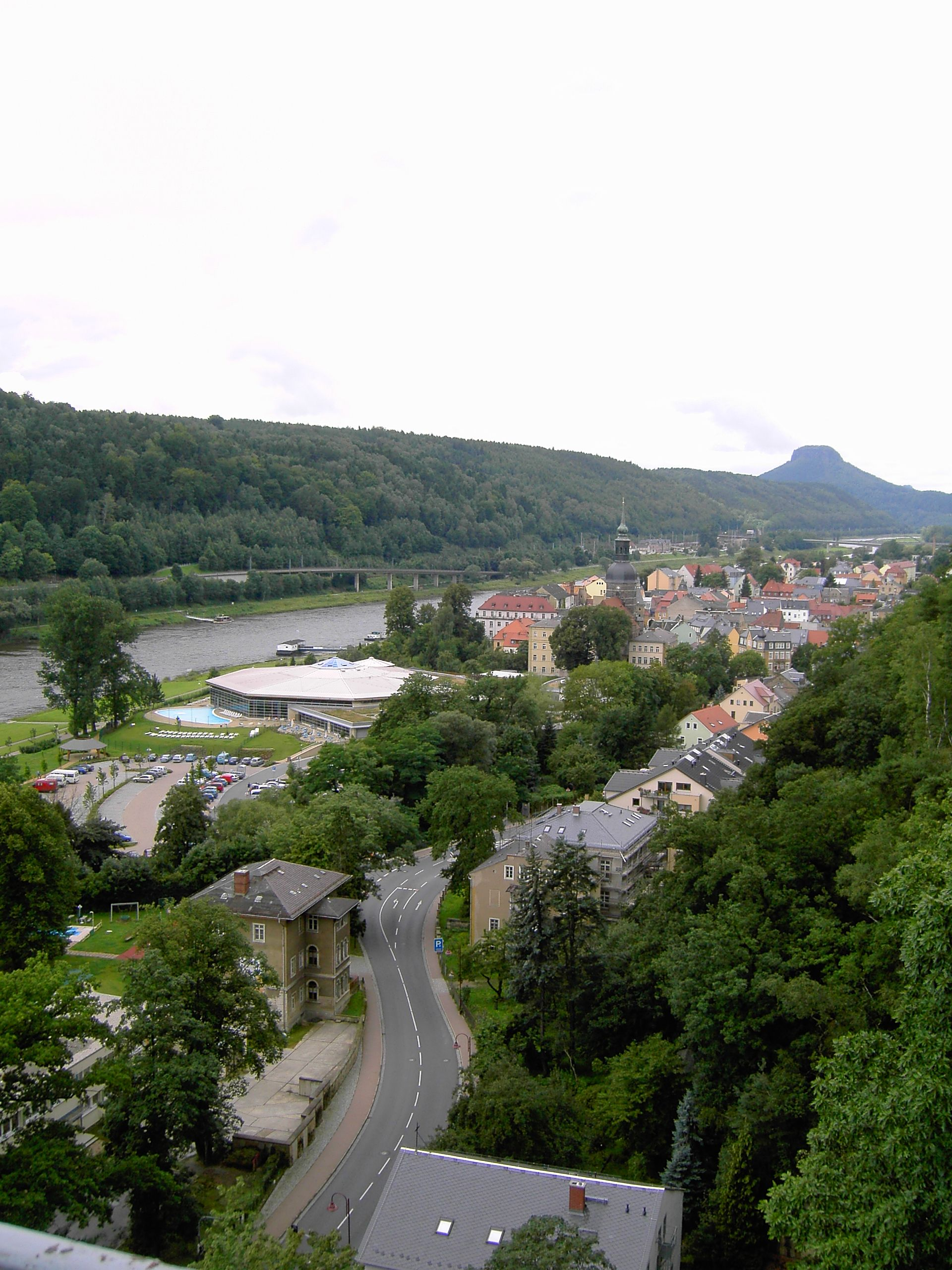

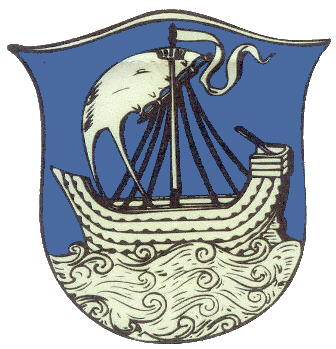
- Coat of arms

- Location of Bad Schandau within Sächsische Schweiz-Osterzgebirge district
- Interactive map of Bad Schandau
- Location within Germany Location within Saxony
- Coordinates: 50°55′N 14°9′E
- Country: Germany
- State: Saxony
- District: Sächsische Schweiz-Osterzgebirge
- First mentioned: 1445
- Subdivisions: core town and 7 villages

Government
  - Mayor (2022–29): Thomas Kunack

Area
  - Total: 46.76 km^{2} (18.05 sq mi)
- Elevation: 146 m (479 ft)

Population (2025-12-31)
  - Total: 3,259
  - Density: 69.70/km^{2} (180.5/sq mi)
- Time zone: UTC+01:00 (CET)
  - Summer (DST): UTC+02:00 (CEST)
- Postal codes: 01812–01814
- Dialling codes: 035022
- Vehicle registration: PIR
- Website: bad-schandau.de

Bad Schandau (German: [baːt ˈʃandaʊ]; Upper Sorbian: Žandow, pronounced [ˈʒandɔf]) is a spa town in Germany, in the Sächsische Schweiz-Osterzgebirge district of Saxony. It is situated on the right bank of the Elbe, at the mouth of the valley of the Kirnitzsch and in the area often described as Saxon Switzerland.

== Geography ==
Bad Schandau lies east of the Elbe right on the edge of the Saxon Switzerland National Park in the Elbe Sandstone Mountains; the National Park Centre is located in the town. The original town centre nestled on the steep, towering sandstone rocks on the right-hand, northern bank of the river Elbe and squeezed in places into the narrow valley of the Kirnitzsch. The town centre lies 121.7 metres (399 ft) above sea level (HN) (market square), whilst its highest points lie over 400 metres (1,300 ft) above sea level. A rural tram line, the Kirnitzschtal Tramway, accompanies the little river for several kilometres and offers access to the nearby walking area.

Bad Schandau is about 6 kilometres (3.7 mi) from the Czech frontier and 33 kilometres (21 mi) southeast of Dresden on the railway to Děčín.

== Subdivisions ==
The borough of Bad Schandau consists of the core town and the villages Krippen, Ostrau, Porschdorf, Postelwitz, Prossen, Schmilka, and Waltersdorf. All of these except Krippen lie on the right (northern) bank of the Elbe, whilst Krippen lies on the left (southern) bank.

=== Krippen ===
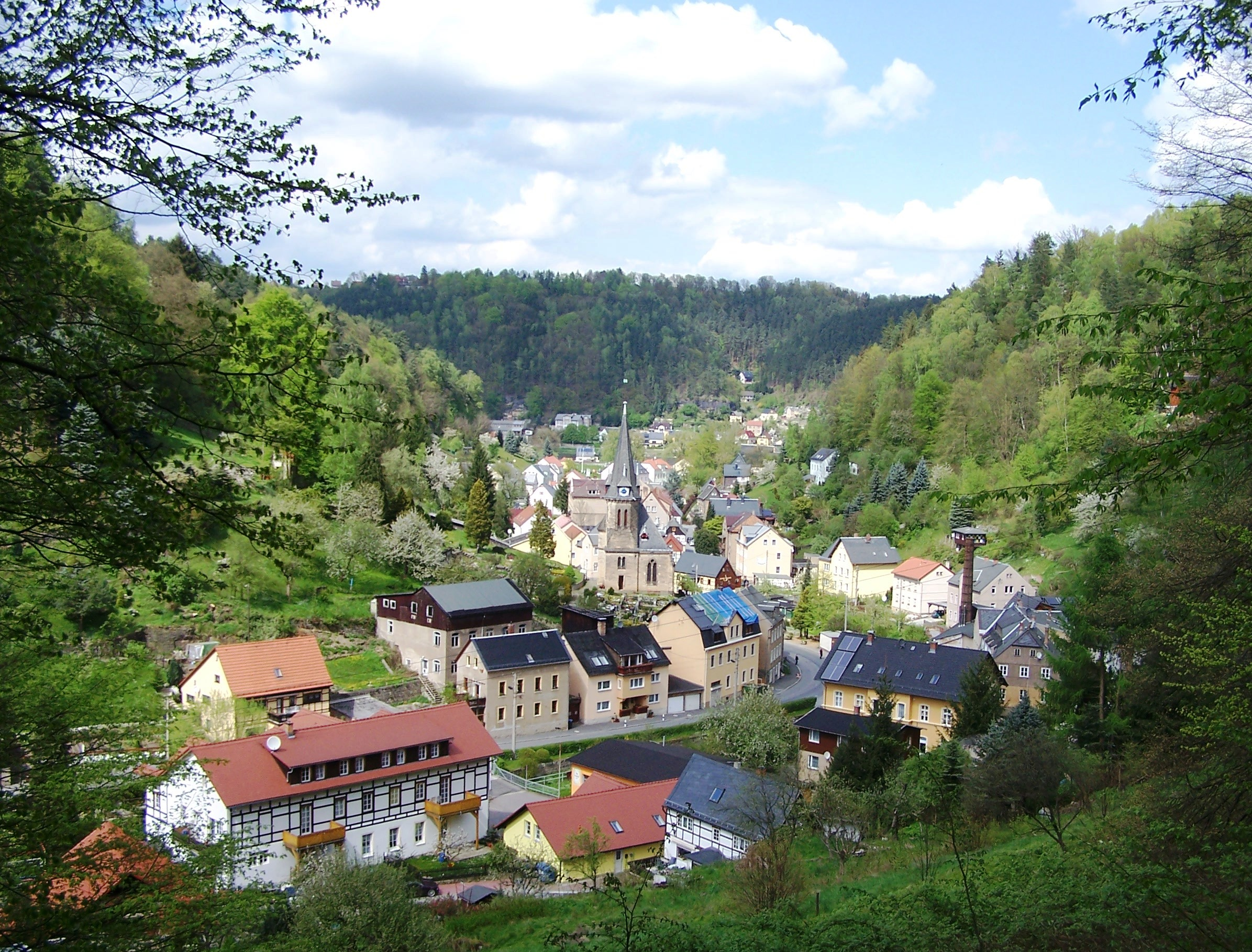
View of Krippen

The original craftsmen's and merchants' settlement left of the Elbe with surviving timber-framed houses that were mentioned as early as 1379 has been a summer resort since the end of the 19th century, when development of tourism began. The village was the sphere of action of the Krippen villager and inventor of mechanical wood pulp for the manufacture of paper, Friedrich Gottlob Keller (1816–95), from 1853 to his death. A memorial tablet on the Keller Museum, house number 76 in the main road named after him and in whom the inventor once lived, celebrates him and his work. In 2009, Krippen had a population of 568 (1999: 720).

A stream, the Krippenbach, joins the Elbe near Krippen. The stream is supplied from the Gautzschgraben spring near the border with Czech Republic, and also from other sources on the other side of the state border, its catchment area reaching almost as far as Maxičky on the Bohemian side of the Elbe Sandstone Mountains below the Okrouhlik (494 metres (1,621 ft) above NN).

Krippen was incorporated into Bad Schandau borough on 1 January 1999.

=== Postelwitz ===
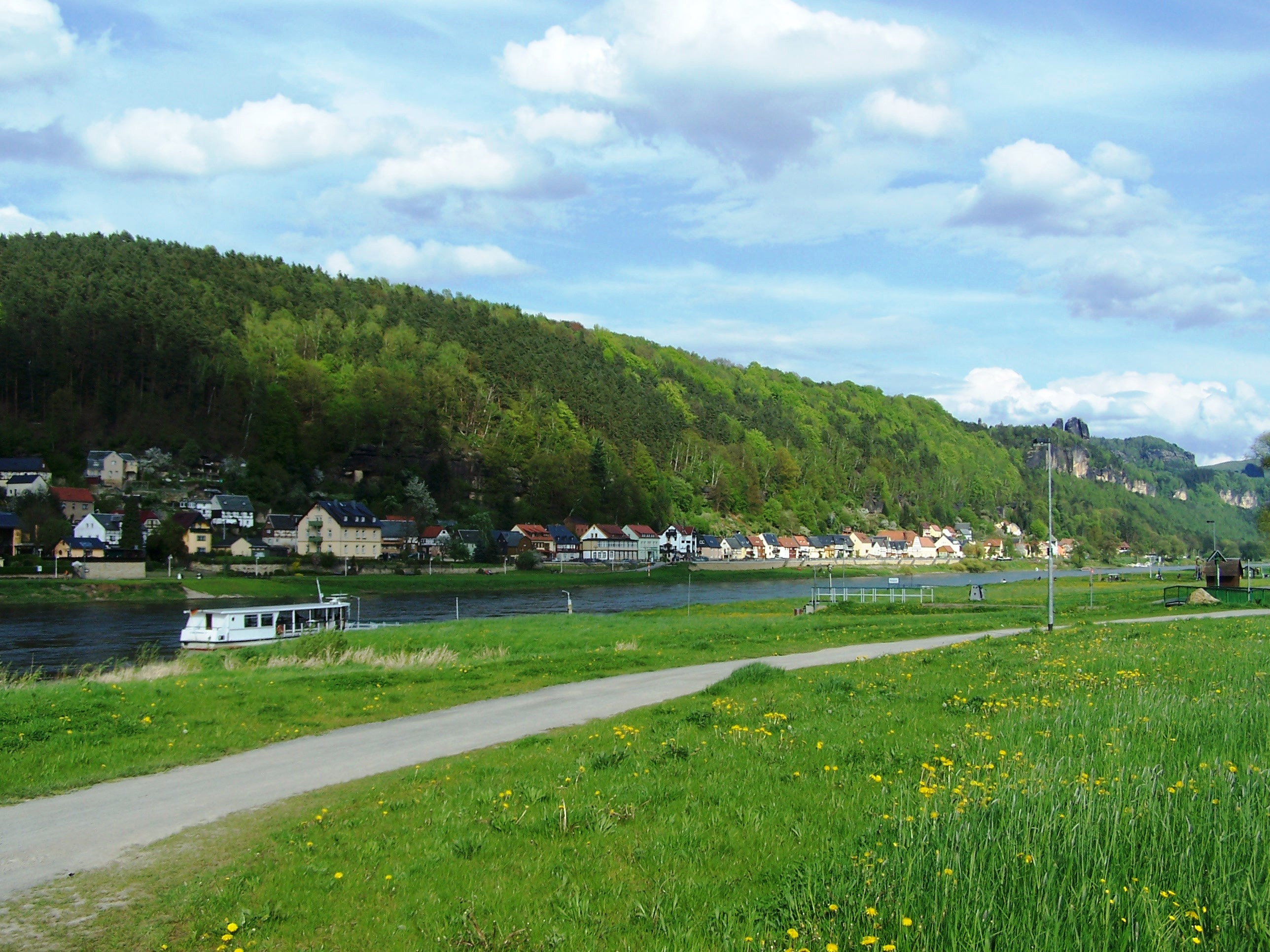
Postelwitz from the other side of the Elbe

The summer resort of Postelwitz has been part of the borough of Bad Schandau since 1934. The village, which comprises a number of separate groups of houses, hugs the rock face tightly about 2 kilometres (1.2 mi) upstream below the rocks of the Schrammsteine. This originally Slavic settlement of rafters, fishermen, stonebreakers and boat builders was first recorded in 1446. Ships' anchor smiths worked in the village until 1968. The local sandstone quarries (at times the most important in the region) worked from the second half of the 16th century until 1907; were then reforested and are accessible today via the Elbe Promenade (Elbpromenade). The surviving timber-framed houses nos. 55–67, the so-called Seven Brothers' Houses (Siebenbrüderhäuser), are linked to a legend in whom a boatman wanted to build a house for each of his sons. His own building was, however, to be taller than them all. On house nos. 43 and 69, as well as the ferryman's house, there are Elbe high-water marks. In 2009, Postelwitz had a population of 282 (1999: 323).

=== Schmilka ===
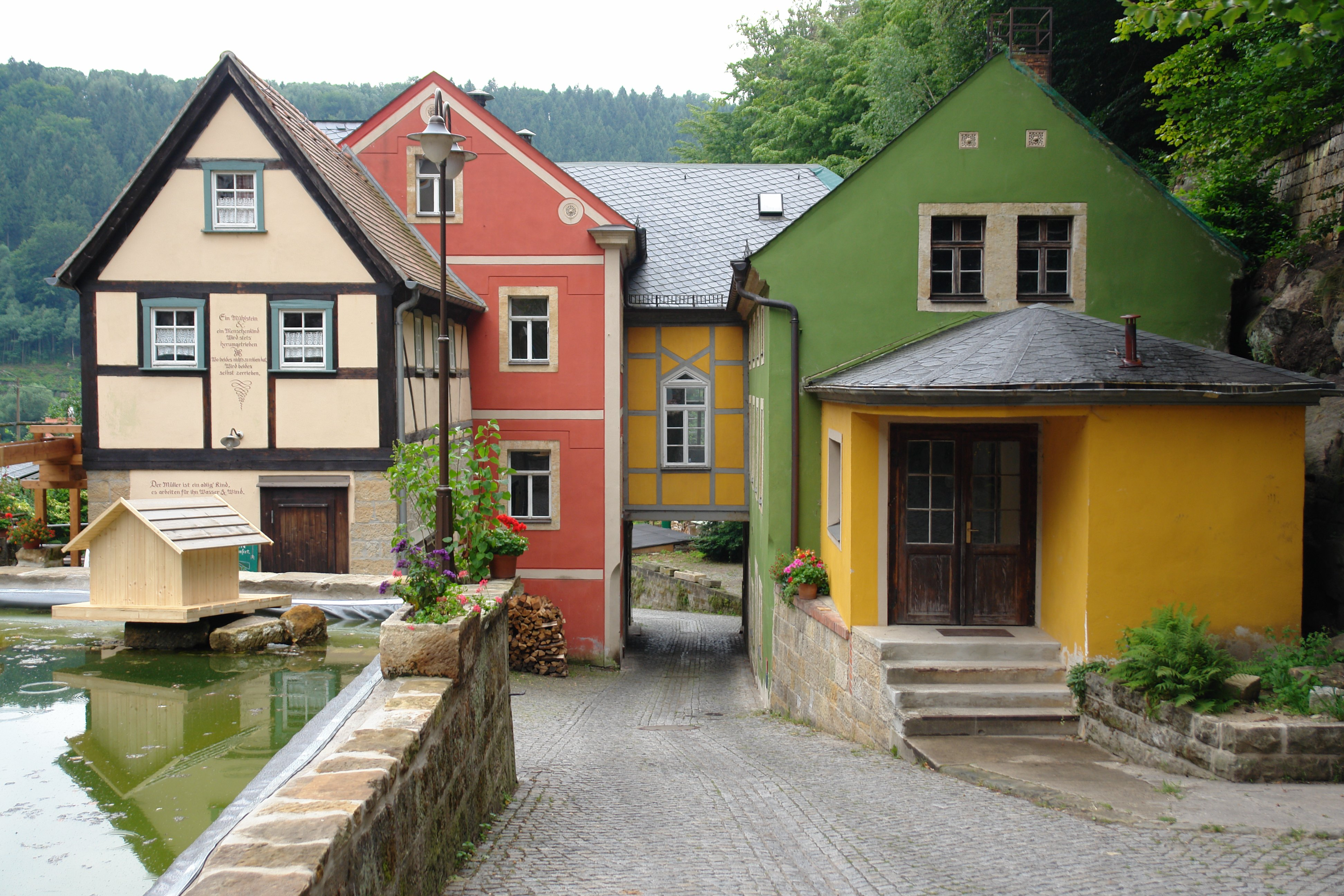
Schmilka Mill

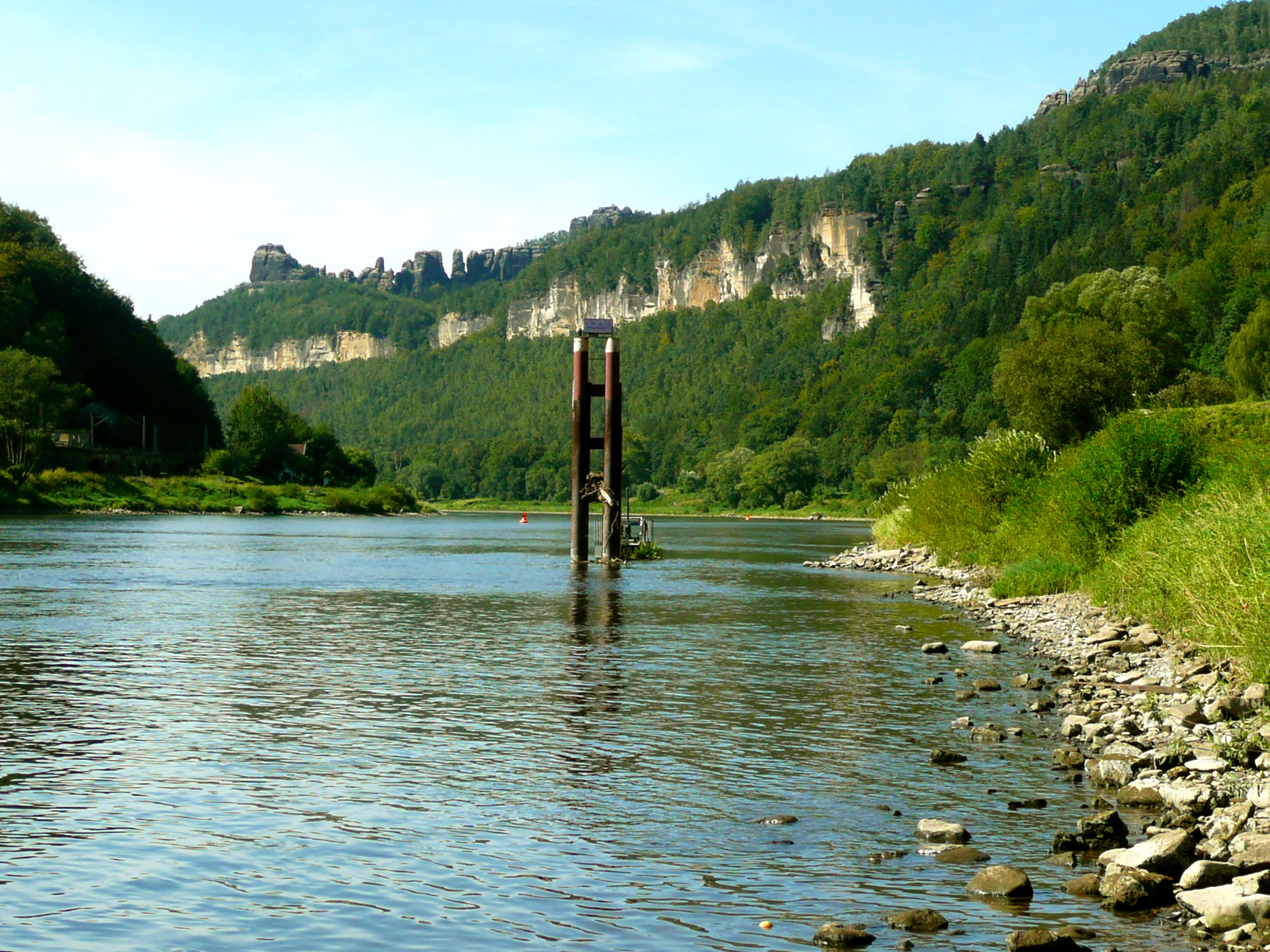
The Elbe in Schmilka

Schmilka, the border village to the Czech Republic on the Elbe at a height of 117 metres (384 ft), has been part of the borough of Bad Schandau since 1 January 1973. This village of Elbe boatmen, rafters, stonecutters, charcoal burners, Pechsieder and forest workers was first recorded in 1582. Small timber-framed houses still dominate its façades. In 2009, Schmilka had 137 inhabitants (1999: 169).

The Ilmen Spring (Ilmenquelle) rises near the border and, with a discharge of 6 L/s, is the most powerful in Saxon Switzerland. The hills of Schrammsteine and Großer Winterberg may be ascended from Schmilka along various paths and climbs such as the Saints' Way (Heilige Stiege) or the Rübezahl Way (Rübezahlstiege).

The Ilmenbach stream drives the Schmilka Mill (Schmilksche Mühle) only a few metres below the spring. Built in 1665, it is one of the first buildings in Schmilka. The mill was closed in the 19th century. In 2007, however, the mill was restored to a functional state again. Historic pictures, including a copperplate by Adrian Ludwig Richter, were used in the restoration. Richter was one of the artists who walked the so-called Painters' Way (Malerweg) in Saxon Switzerland about 200 years ago. The Painters' Way runs directly by the mill. The Schmilka Mill traditionally runs during the Mill Festival that takes place every year at Whitsun. Within the mill is a holiday home, the Mühlchen ("Little Mill"), which can be used as holiday accommodation. The village also has a brewery, and functions as a wellness retreat with organic food.

=== Ostrau ===
Ostrau (German pronunciation: [ˈɔstʁaʊ]) on the Ostrauer Scheibe rises 130 metres (430 ft) above the Elbe and lies at a height of 245 metres (804 ft) above NN. The ice-age loess-loam on the plateau of the Ostrauer Scheibe enabled the establishment in former times of a German village for seven farmsteads. Ostrau has been directly linked to the town of Bad Schandau since 1904 with an electric passenger lift that was built at the initiative of the hotelier, Rudolf Sendig, who also financed it. Old timber-framed farmsteads, guesthouses (Pensionen), holiday homes, a modern spa facility, inns, villas and family homes make up the buildings of the village. With just under 100 inhabitants, the village had a very isolated existence on an exposed upland at the end of the 19th century. But even in 1900, there were ambitious plans for this location with its long-distance, all-round views to be turned into an exclusive tourist centre with sports facilities and an airfield. But only the aforementioned lift was built along with wooden, Scandinavian-style villas on the Ostrauer Ring, also at Sendig's initiative. In 2009, Ostrau had a population of 419 (1999: 541).

== History ==
In the first half of the 14th century, German settlers acquired the Elbe meadows between Rathmannsdorf and Postelwitz from the feudal estate of Hohnstein and founded a trading post here. Schandau was first mentioned in the records in 1445 and was given, in effect, the status of a town as a result of its important location as a trading site on the Elbe in 1467 by a council constitution. Since about 1800, Bad Schandau has been a spa town and summer resort. In 1877, the place was given a permanent crossing over the river, the Carola Bridge. In 1920, the town was granted the official title of "Bad" ("Spa"). In 1936, it became a Kneipp spa.

The town is the smallest German place with its own tram service, the Kirnitzschtal Tramway. The tramway runs from Schandau to Lichtenhain Waterfall and has been working since 1898.

Bad Schandau was badly hit by the flooding of the Elbe in the years 1845, 2002 and 2006. The floodwater on 16/17 August 2002 stood at 9.78 metres (32.1 ft) above average, 4.28 metres (14.0 ft) above the market square and 3.46 metres (11.4 ft) high in the church. The Schöna gauge reached 12.04 (Bad Schandau gauge 11.88), volumetric flow 4,780 m^{3}/s. The high-water mark was 4 centimetres (1.6 in) below that of 1845. On 3 April 2006, a high-water mark of 6.78 metres (22.2 ft) and 1.28 metres (4.2 ft) above the market square above average was reached at about 11 pm. Schöna gauge 8.88, volumetric flow 2720 m^{3}/s. The square floods when the Schöna gauge reaches 7.60.

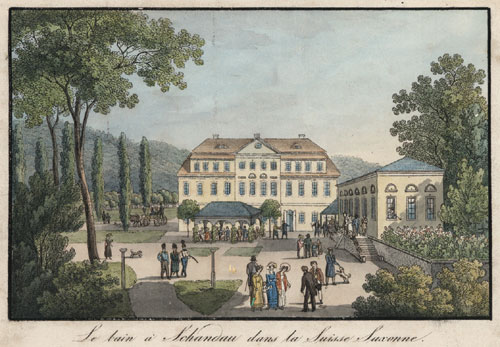
Spa facilities of Bad Schandau around 1820

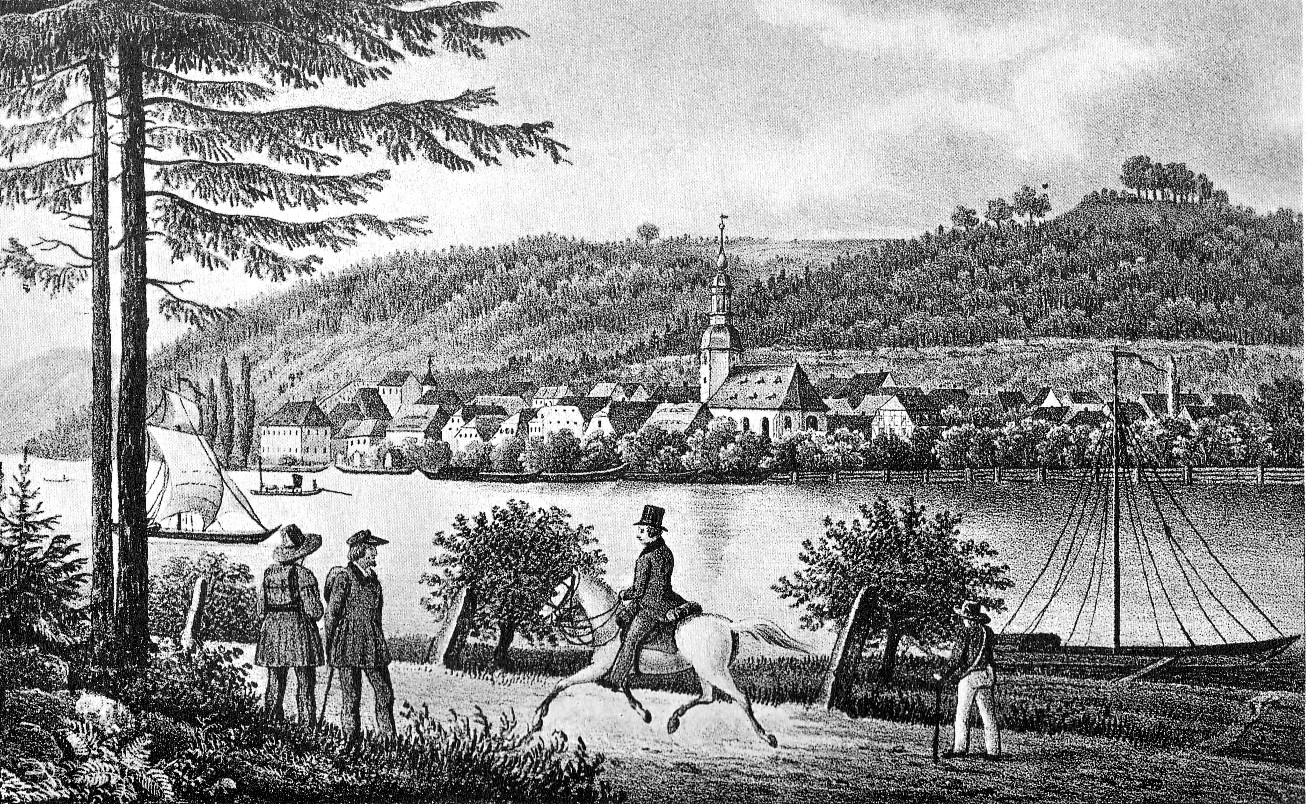
Bad Schandau around 1850

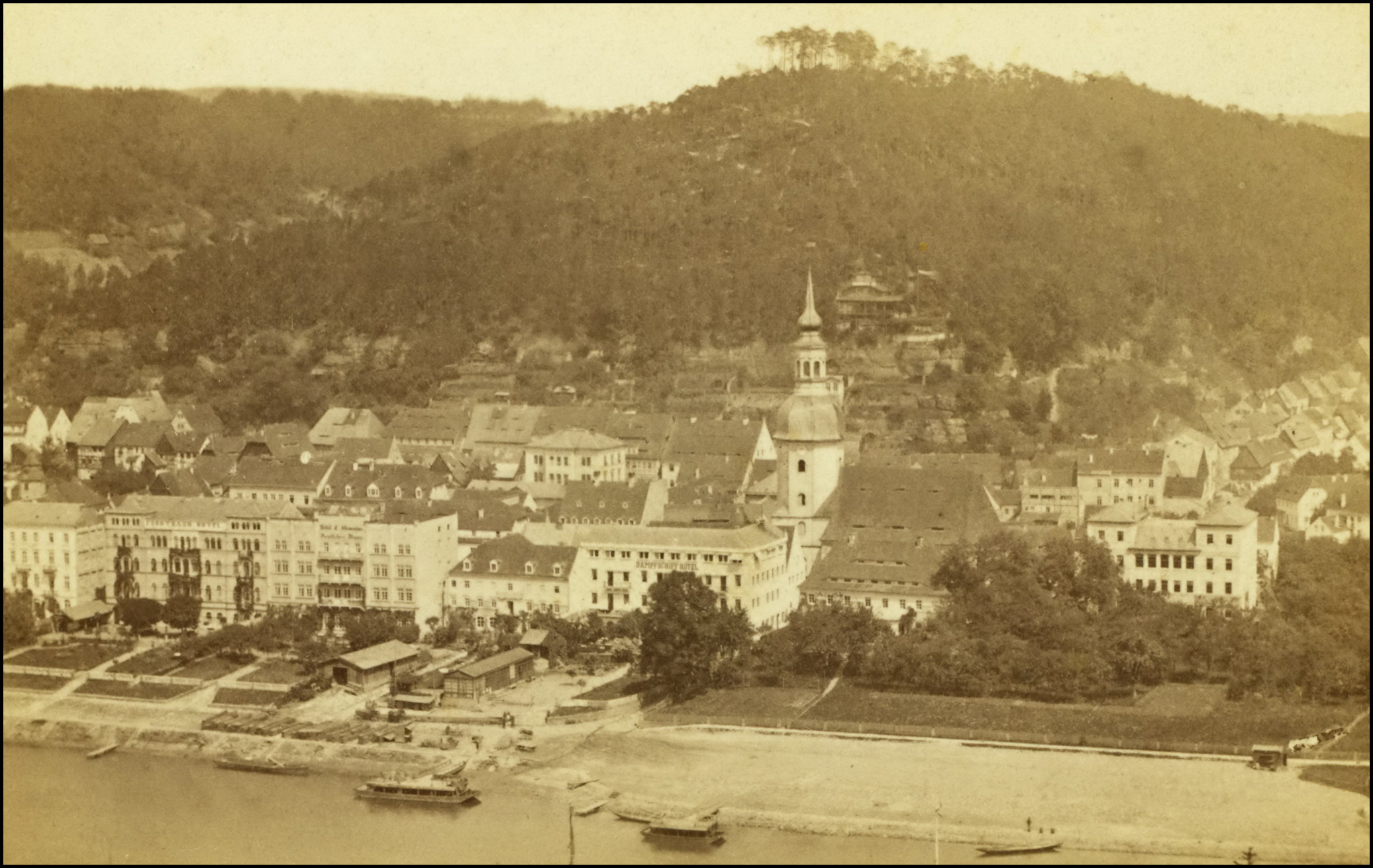
Bad Schandau around 1888

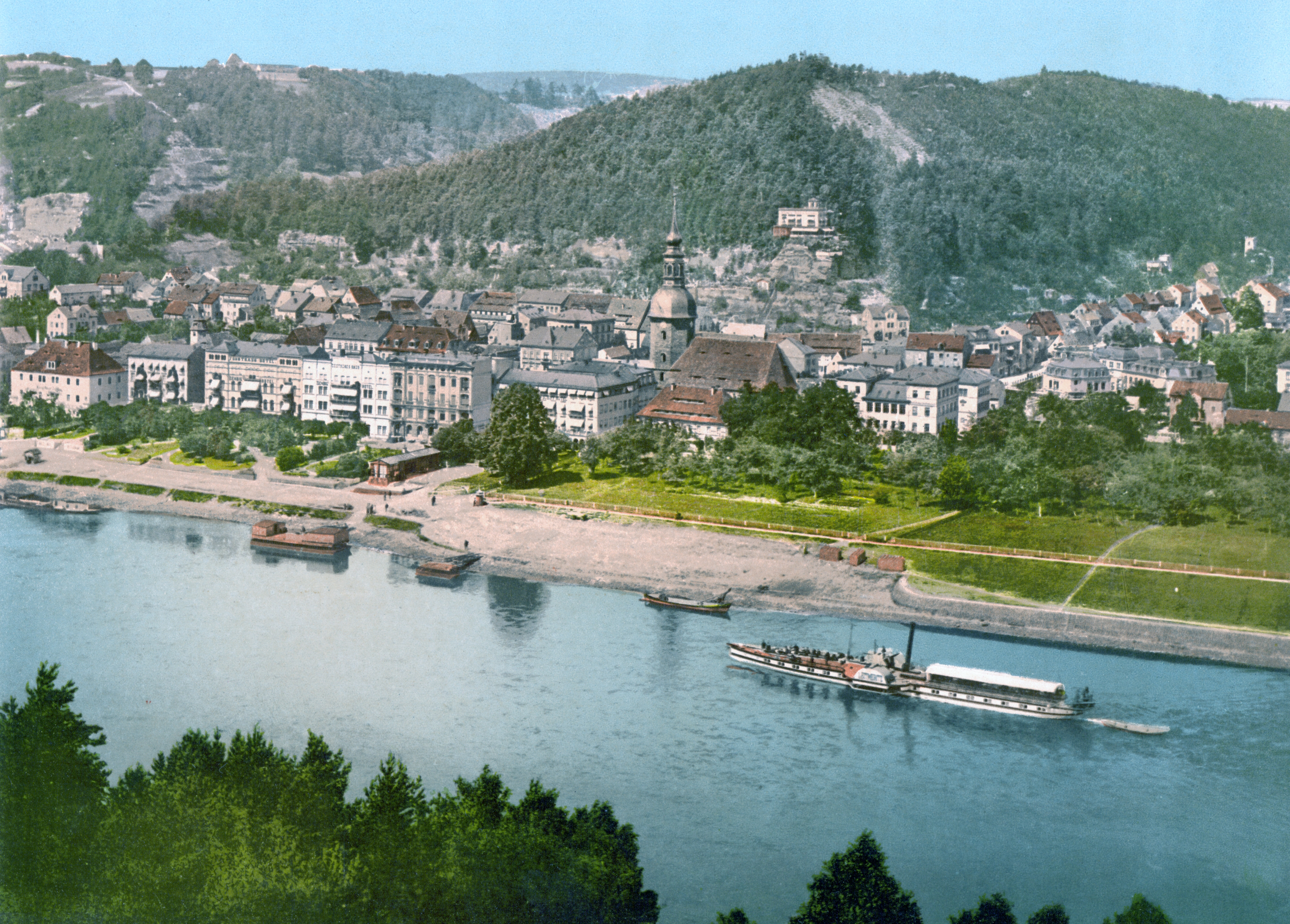
Bad Schandau around 1900

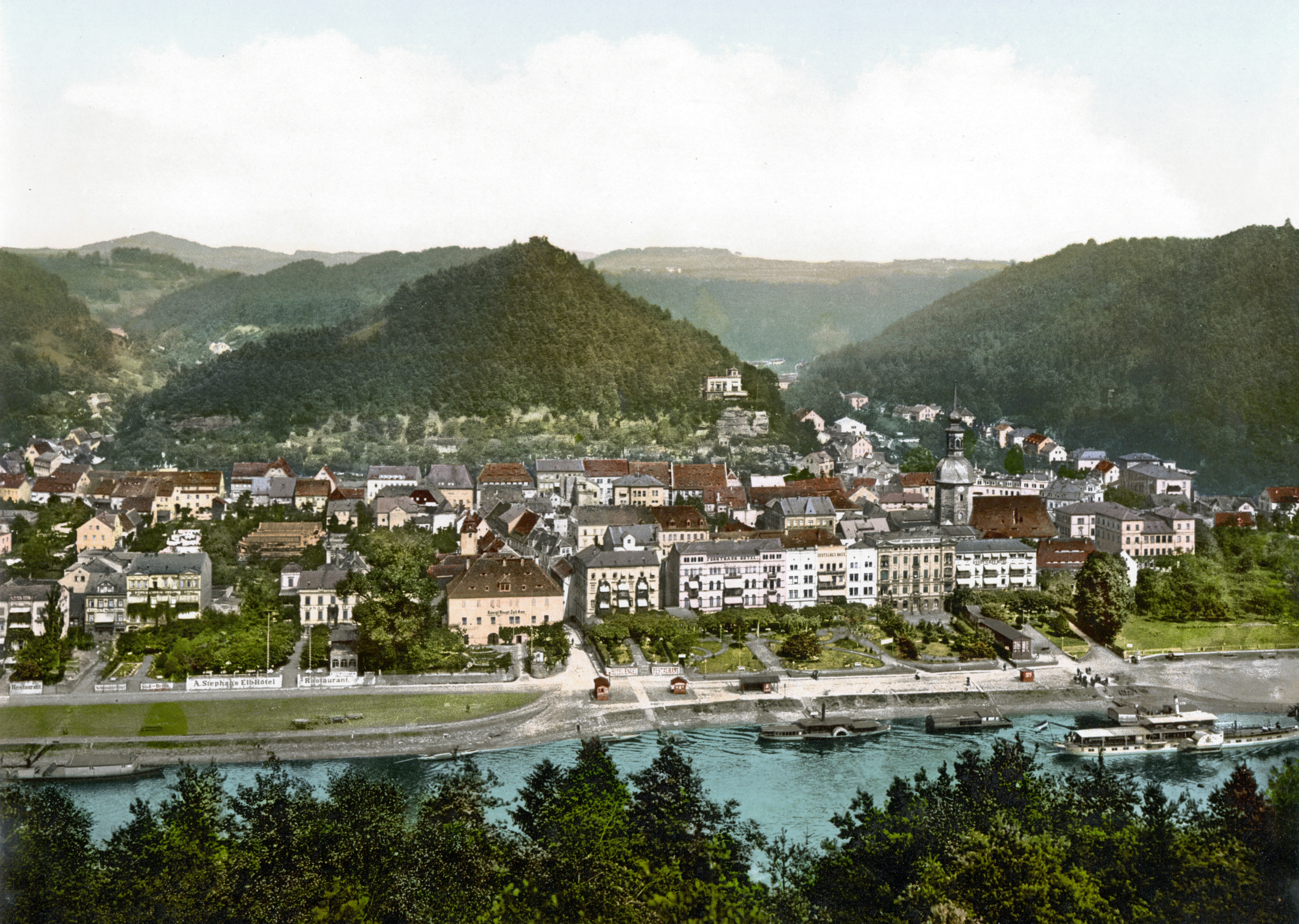
Bad Schandau around 1900

=== Coat of arms ===
In 1480, Schandau was granted the right by Prince Ernest of Saxony to bear a coat of arms and a seal. The coat of arms shows a ship under sail, probably a reference to the importance of Elbe shipping.

== Politics ==
=== Town council ===
The local elections of 26 May 2019 saw a voter turnout of 69.9% (+9.5) with the following results:

Party / List	Percentage	+/−	Seats
AfD	21.8%	+21.8	1
CDU	26.3%	−7.9	4
The Left	8.1%	−6.9	1
NPD	4.8%	−1.9	0
Prossen Voters' Association (Wählervereinigung Prossen)	7.9%	−5.1 *	1
Tourism Voters' Association (Wählervereinigung Tourismus)	26.5%	−5.1 *	4
Waltersdorf Voters' Association (Wählervereinigung Waltersdorf)	4.7%	−5.1 *	0

+/−: Changes against the local elections of 25 May 2014, *: Voters' associations combined

=== Administration ===
Bad Schandau is a fulfilling municipality (erfüllende Gemeinde) in the Bad Schandau Administrative Association (Verwaltungsgemeinschaft Bad Schandau) for the municipalities of Rathmannsdorf and Reinhardtsdorf-Schöna.

== Twin towns – sister cities ==
Bad Schandau is twinned with:

- Česká Kamenice, Czech Republic
- Fichtenau, Germany
- Gößweinstein, Germany
- Überlingen, Germany

== Culture and places of interest ==
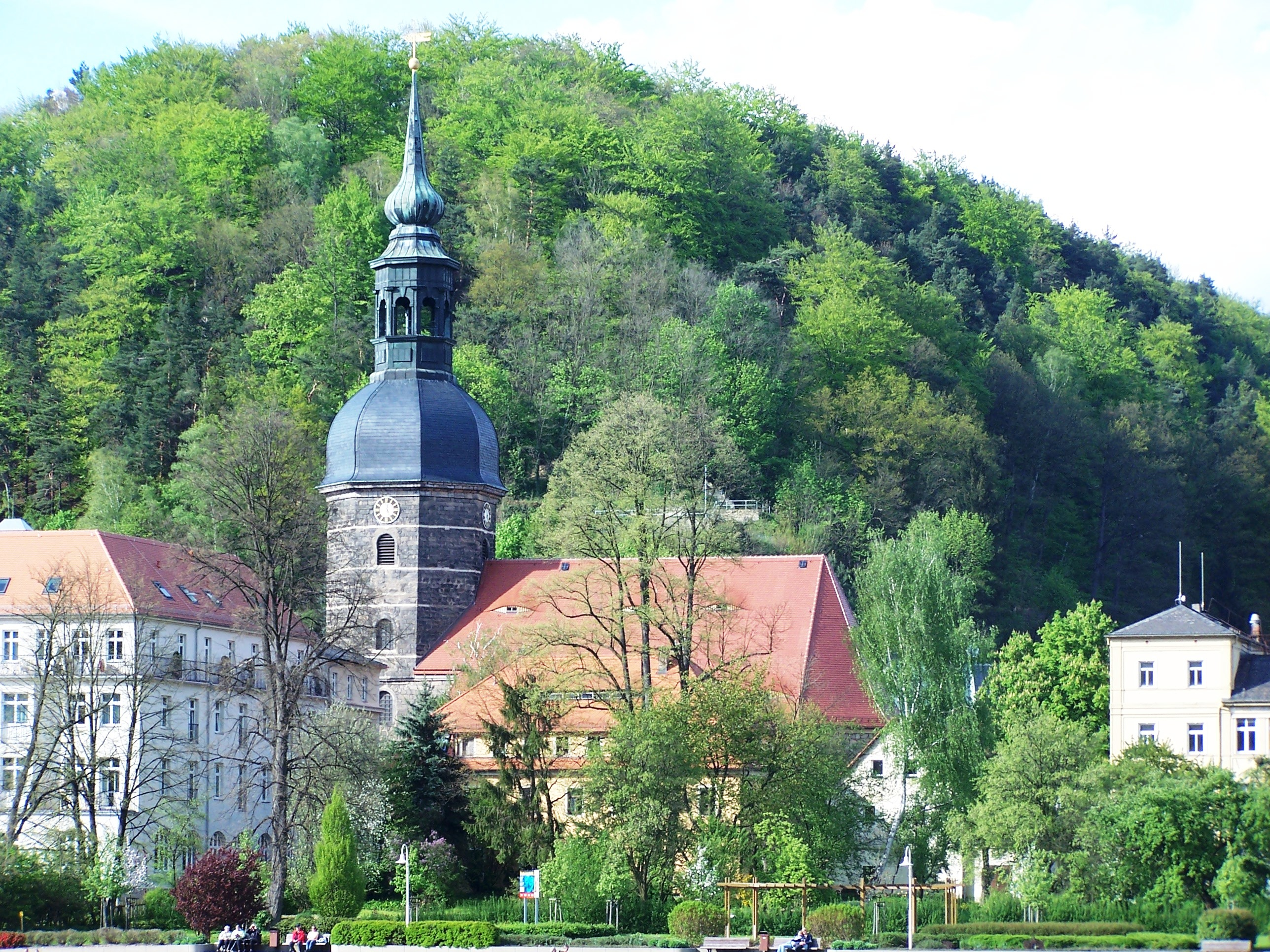
St John's Church in Bad Schandau

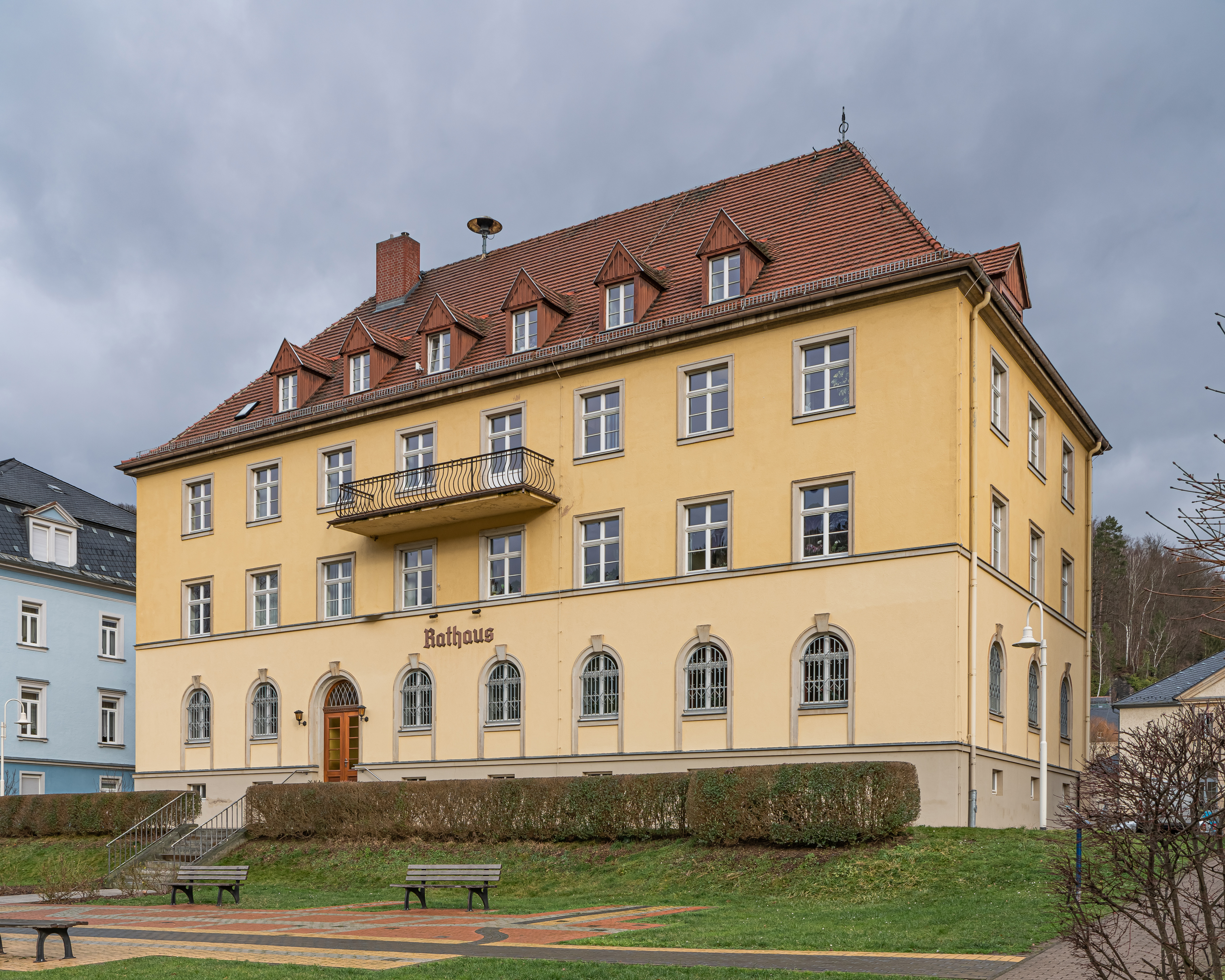
Bad Schandau's town hall

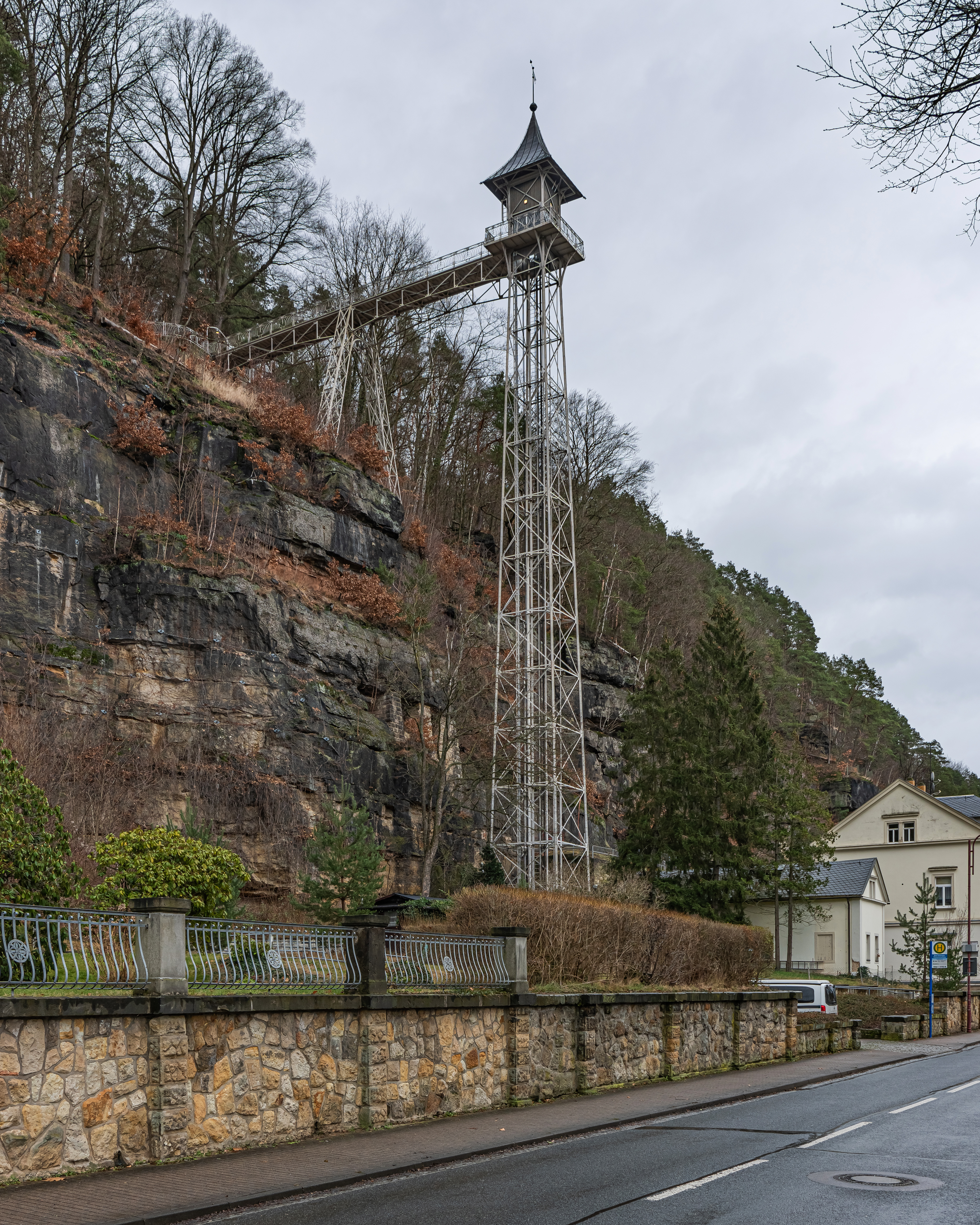
The Bad Schandau Elevator, 2005

=== Overview ===
Schandau was described in the Encyclopædia Britannica Eleventh Edition (1911) thus:

Schandau has an Evangelical parish church, a hydropathic establishment and a school of river navigation. The position of Schandau in the heart of the romantic "Saxon Switzerland" has made it a place of importance, and thousands of tourists make it their headquarters in summer. For their accommodation numerous hotels and villas have been erected. The chief manufactures of the town are artificial flowers and furniture.

The prefix "Bad" was added in 1920 in acknowledgement of the spa status of the town (the German "Bad" means "spa" in English).

The 2009 film, Inglourious Basterds, directed by Quentin Tarantino, was shot primarily in Bad Schandau, and at Studio Babelsberg in Berlin.

=== Museums ===
- Town Gallery (Stadtgalerie)
- Local History Museum (Heimatmuseum)
- National Park Museum (Nationalparkmuseum)
- Friedrich Gottlob Keller Museum, Krippen, Friedrich-Gottlob-Keller-Straße 76 (about the discovery and inventor of mechanical wood pulp paper)

=== Buildings / places of interest ===
Bad Schandau's town profile on the right bank of the river is dominated by the hotels of the Gründerzeit bordering the Elbe, the two bridges and St John's Church (Johanniskirche).

From 2002 to 2007, comprehensive renovation work was carried out on the Gründerzeit hotels on the riverfront – the best-known in the 19th century was the Dampfschiff ("Steamship"). The building was gutted from the ground upwards and the façades restored. Several apartment complexes are housed in bathhouse villas (Bäder-Villen). The ensemble was opened again in 2007 under the name Elbresidenz Bad Schandau.

The impressive Lutheran St John's Church with its octagonal west tower has existed in its present form since 1679. The baroque skylight turret was added in 1711 following a town fire. The interior of the church with its wooden coffer, single-storey matroneum and stained glass windows in the chancel is the result of fundamental conversion work in 1876–77. Especially valuable is the two-storied Renaissance altar in sandstone, which the Dresden sculptor, Hans Walther, originally made for the Kreuzkirche, Dresden, and which stood in Dresden Anne's from 1760 to 1902.

The main sight in the market square (Marktplatz) with its town hall (1863) and several Renaissance buildings (the Gambrinus brewery, house No. 1 with its timber-framed upper storey) since 1896 has been the Sendig Fountain next to the church, which for reasons unknown lost its Art Nouveau top extension with sculptures during World War II; it was reconstructed from 1994 to 2011.

The spa facilities and the 3,500 m^{2} Botanical Garden (Pflanzengarten Bad Schandau) with over 1,500 species of plants is located at the entrance to the Kirnitzsch valley. By the tram stop of the Kirnitzschtal Tramway stands the so-called Ice Age Rock (Eiszeitstein) illustrating that in the Pleistocene epoch the inland ice sheet extended as far as here from Scandinavia.

Near the Park Hotel and the historical lift to Ostrau stands the Roman Catholic Church next to the hillside on the right of the Elbe. This building was built as accommodation for a Russian diplomat in the classic Saint Petersburg villa style of the 19th century and has been used since 1924 by the Catholic Church as a consecrated building.

The historical lift to Ostrau is a 50-metre-high (160 ft), free-standing iron construction, that links the village of Ostrau higher up the hill. The hotelier, Rudolf Sendig, had this electrically driven lift built in 1904 by the firms of Kelle & Hildebrandt (iron framework) and Kühnscherf & Söhne (lift). The lift was officially opened on Easter Sunday 1905 and the rivetted structure, that has been protected since 1954, was refurbished in 1989–1990. Due to its view over Saxon Switzerland around Bad Schandau, especially the rocks of the Schrammsteine, but also because of the understated Art Nouveau ornamentation, a journey on the technical monument has become something of a tourist attraction.

The so-called Ostrauer Scheibe is a plateau that can be reached on foot along a hiking trail from the Botanical Garden in the Kirnitsch Valley, over the old cart track (Ostrauer Berg), as well as by car along a road that weaves in hairpin bends up from Postelwitz.

The new Schrammstein Open-Air Pool (Schrammstein-Bad) that was badly damaged before it could open by the flooding of the Elbe in 2002 went bust but, after a two-year delay, was able to open under its new owners, toskanaworld, as the so-called Toskana Thermal Baths (Toskana-Therme); this firm has similar facilities in Bad Sulza and Bad Orb.

=== Memorials ===
- VVN monument in the Spa Park (Kurpark) to the victims of Fascism
- Memorial rock in front of the mountain hut (Berghütte über dem Zahnsgrund) in the village of Ostrau for the Communist resistance fighter Kurt Schlosser, who was murdered in Dresden in 1944
- Memorial tablet from 1957 at a Cave in the Schrammsteinen (Höhle in den Schrammsteinen) commemorating the resistance fighters of the United Climbing Division of Dresden (Vereinigten Kletterabteilung Dresden)

=== Dialect ===
A special form of the Upper Saxon dialect is spoken in Bad Schandau: the South East Meissen dialect, which is one of five Upper Saxon or Meissen dialects.

== Economy and infrastructure ==
=== Transport ===
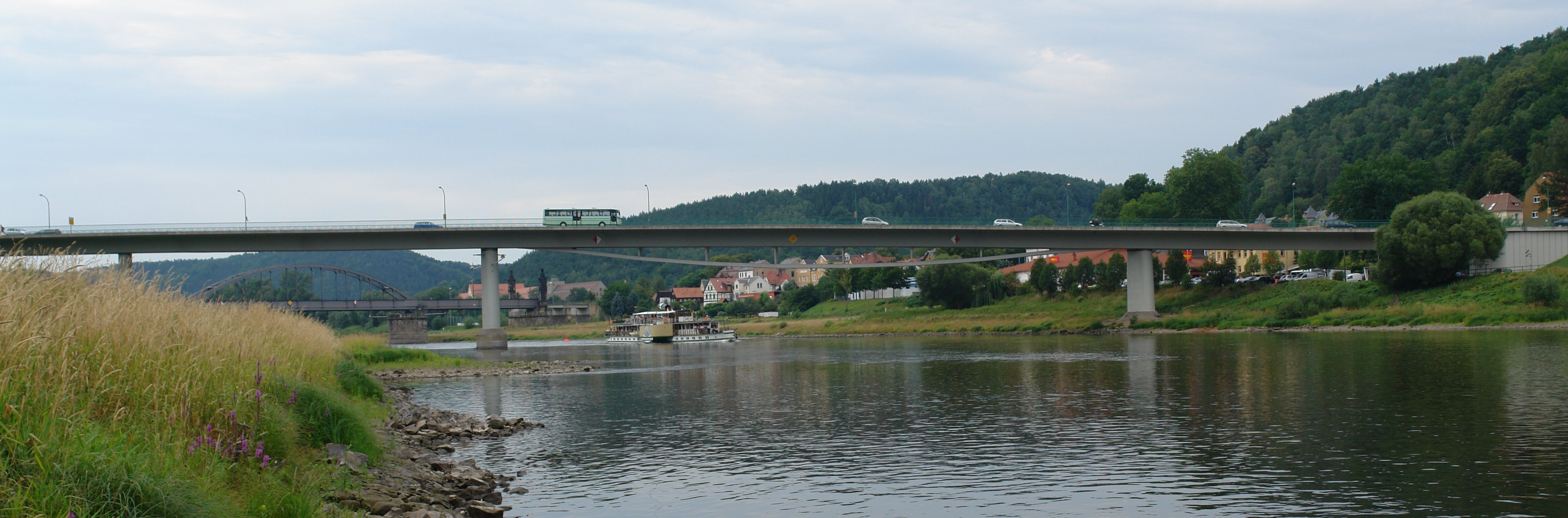
View of Bad Schandau's Elbe Road Bridge. Behind: the Carola Bridge (railway)

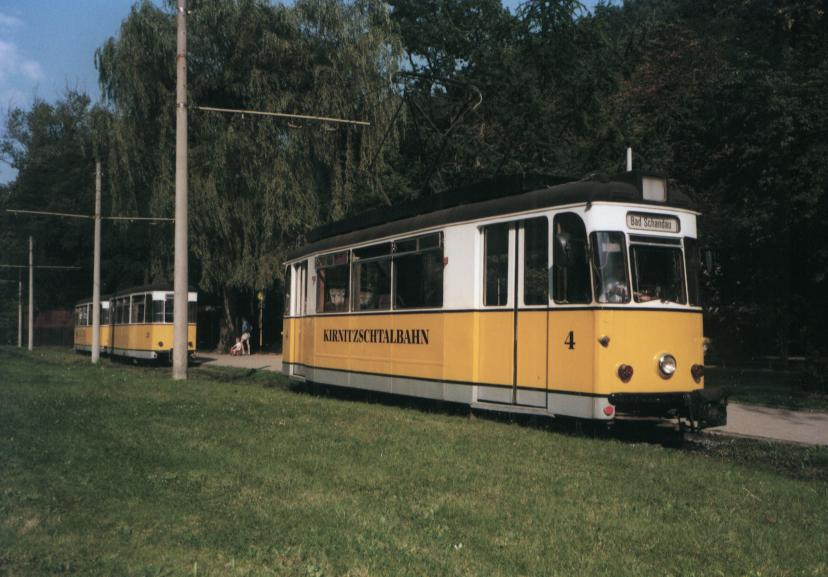
Kirnitzschtal tramway

On the left bank of the Elbe runs the track of the Dresden–Děčín railway. Bad Schandau railway station is a stop for EuroCity links between Berlin and Budapest, the CityNightLine between Prague and Copenhagen/Amsterdam/Zürich as well as the S-Bahn between Meißen and Schöna that passes through Dresden. Several cross-border regional trains also work the line to Děčín. Another regional railway link to Sebnitz and Neustadt in Saxony runs on the Bautzen–Bad Schandau railway.

Line	Route	Frequency
SB 71	Bad Schandau – Sebnitz – Neustadt in Sachsen	Two-hourly services
S 1	Meißen-Triebischtal – Radebeul – Dresden-Neustadt – Dresden Hbf – Heidenau – Pirna – Bad Schandau – Schöna	Half-hourly services

The town centre may be reached from the station over a ferry link as well as the Elbe Road Bridge at Bad Schandau. Other ferries run between the town of Schandau and Krippen and between Schmilka and the station of Schmilka-Hirschmühle in Reinhardtsdorf-Schöna.

The town may also be accessed on regional bus services run by the OVPS. OVPS also operate the Kirnitzschtal tramway, a historical tram service that runs from the town centre to the Lichtenhain Waterfall. The Elbe Cycleway runs along the banks of the Elbe.

=== Local firms ===
- Rehaklinik Falkensteinklinik (Stadtteil Ostrau): about 125 employees, specialises in the treatment of digestive and metabolic diseases, cardiovascular diseases and diabetes
- Rehaklinik Kirnitzschtalklinik: specialises in conservative orthopaedic therapy of acute and degenerative diseases of the muscular and skeletal systems

== Floods of August 2002 ==
Bad Schandau was badly hit by the floods, along with neighbouring towns Reinhardtsdorf-Schöna and Pirna.

== Notable people ==
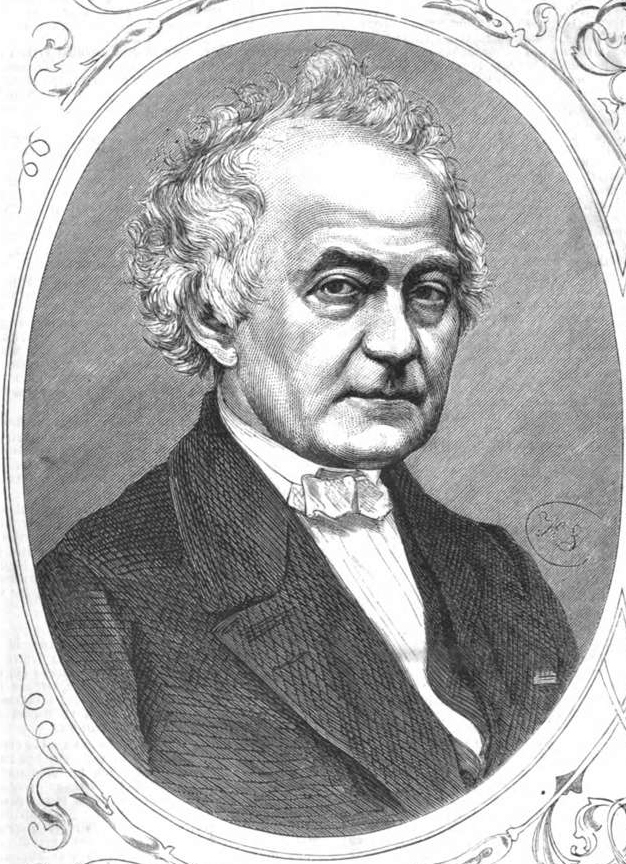
Heinrich Leberecht Fleischer 1871

- Gotthelf Traugott Esaias Häntzschel (1779–1848), German businessman and politician, member of parliament (Kingdom of Saxony)
- Heinrich Leberecht Fleischer (1801–1888), orientalist
- Rudolph Hering (1803–1888), Saxon Bergrat
- Johannes Theodor Müller (1873–1953), German-Australian sculptor
- Karl Schröder (1912–1996), cinematographer

=== Honorary citizens ===
- Martin Mutschmann, 1933 (revoked ?)
