= Brand (Saxon Switzerland) =

Coordinates: 50°57′22″N 14°07′36″E

Brand (Sächsische Schweiz)
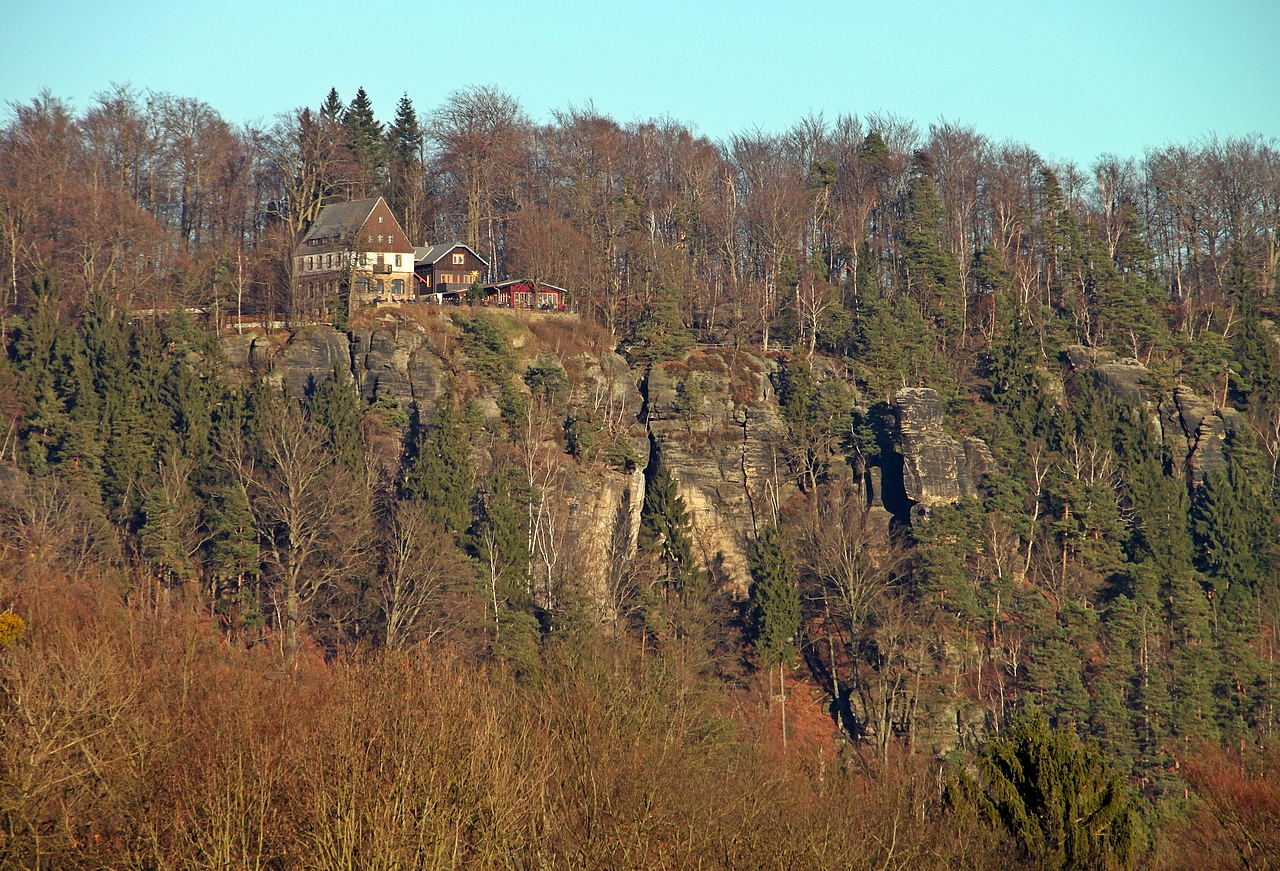
- Brand (317 m) as seen from Waltersdorf

Geography
- Location within Saxony
- Location: Saxony, Germany

Brand (Sächsische Schweiz) is a mountain in the Saxon Switzerland, southeastern Germany. It is located above the river Polenz and offers one of the most famous view points of the region. Its name (German for fire) refers to the wildfires that occurred in the surrounding forests.

The Brand became a tourist destination in the early 19th century. In 1856, a log cabin was built and in 1877 replaced by a stone house that served as an inn and was later expanded to offer lodging. The historical buildings now called Brand-Baude were modernized in 2007 and are now one of the tourist information centres of the Saxon Switzerland National Park, including a restaurant and hostel.

The Brand, with its views over the eastern, southern and western parts of the Saxon Switzerland and even the Eastern Ore Mountains, is part of the Malerweg (Artist's Way), a popular hiking trail that is named after the many painters who visited the region in the past centuries.
