= Anne's Church, Dresden =

Coordinates: 51°02′56″N 13°43′40″E

Anne's Church
- German: Annenkirche
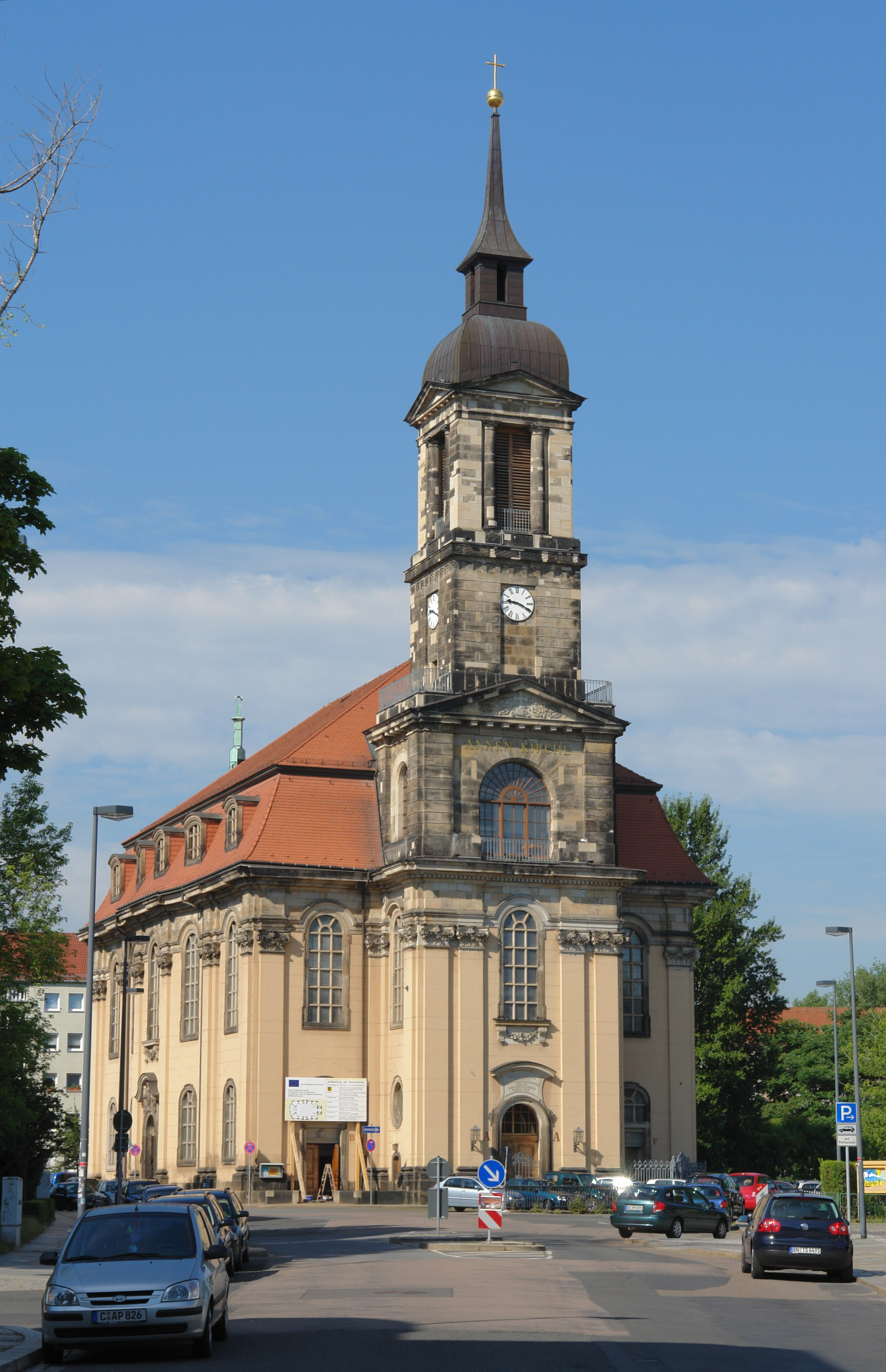
- Anne's Church
- Location: Dresden
- Country: Germany
- Denomination: Lutheran

History
- Status: Parish church
- Dedication: Anne of Denmark, Electress of Saxony

Architecture
- Years built: 1764–69

Anne's Church (German: Annenkirche) is named in honour of Anne of Denmark, Electress of Saxony. The original 1578 church was destroyed by Prussian troops in 1760 during the Seven Years' War. The new church was opened in 1769.
