= Kirnitzsch =

River in Germany

Kirnitzsch Křinice, Kirnischt
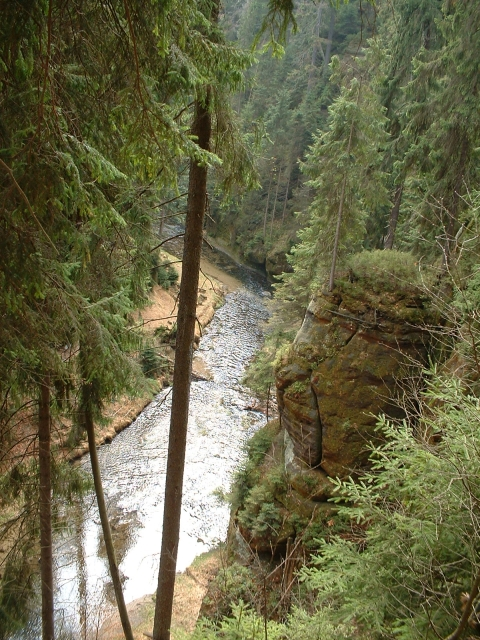

Location
- Countries: Czech Republic; Germany

Physical characteristics
- Source
  - location: in Šluknov Hook in the Czech Republic west of Studánka
  - coordinates: 49°47′15″N 12°35′02″E
  - elevation: 490 m n.m.
- Mouth
  - location: in Bad Schandau into the Elbe
  - coordinates: 50°55′00″N 14°09′36″E
  - elevation: 105 m above sea level (NN)
- Length: 45 km (28 mi)
- Basin size: 140 km^{2} (54 sq mi)
- Discharge
  - location: at Kirnitzsch valley (3.5 km (2.2 mi) above its mouth) gauge
  - average: 1.43 m^{3}/s (50 cu ft/s)
  - minimum: Record low: 0.267 m^{3}/s (9.4 cu ft/s) (in 2005); Average low: 0.622 m^{3}/s (22.0 cu ft/s)
  - maximum: Average high: 13.3 m^{3}/s (470 cu ft/s); Record high: 59.3 m^{3}/s (2,090 cu ft/s) (in 1995)

Basin features
- Progression: Elbe→ North Sea
- Landmarks: Small towns: Bad Schandau
- Population: 2266 (as at: 1999) in the Kirnitzsch valley
- Tributaries
  - left: Rotes Floß
  - right: Zeidlerbach, Weißbach, Heidelbach
- Waterbodies: Reservoirs: Obere Schleuse
- Navigable: no

The Kirnitzsch (German), in Bohemia also called the Kirnischt, Czech: Křinice, is a right tributary of the River Elbe, which passes through the Czech Republic and the German state of Saxony.

== Geography ==
The Kirnitzsch, also called the Kirnscht or Kirnsch in the local dialect, rises in the Lusatian Highlands in Bohemia west of the village of Studánka (German Schönborn) and flows westwards through the town of Krásná Lípa (Schönlinde). Behind the village of Kyjov (Khaa, part of Krásná Lípa) it wends its way along narrow ravines through the sandstone rocks of Bohemian Switzerland. The wild, romantic valley is also called the Khaatal (Kyjovske údoli) (Khaa valley).

On the site of the former village of Hinterdaubitz (Zadní Doubice), demolished after 1945, the border stream of Weißbach empties into the Kirnitzsch, which, from this point, forms the border between the Czech Republic and Saxony. Further downstream the Kirnitzsch is first impounded at the Obere Schleuse ("Upper Lock") so that boating can take place on the stream.

At the end of the Kirnitzsch Gorge (Kirnitzschklamm) used to stand the houses of the border village of Zadní Jetřichovice (Hinterdittersbach) and the settlement of Křinice (Kirnscht). These places, too, no longer exist. From here the Kirnitzsch flows through Saxon Switzerland, where it is impounded again at the Niedere Schleuse ("Lower Lock"). Shortly thereafter the Kirnitzsch enters the narrow Kirnitzsch Valley (Kirnitzschtal). It flows through the valley for about 45 kilometres (28 mi) to the Lichtenhain Waterfall. After another 8 kilometres (5 mi) it discharges into the Elbe at Bad Schandau. Over its last few kilometres it is followed by the Kirnitzschtal tramway that runs parallel to the Kirnitzsch.

== See also ==
- List of rivers of the Czech Republic
- List of rivers of Saxony

== Sources ==
- Wieland Büttner: Die Buschmühle im Kirnitzschtal. in: Petra Binder (Hg.): Vom Berg zum Tal - Wasser, die zur Elbe fließen. Landkalenderbuch für die Sächsische Schweiz und das Osterzgebirge 2009. Schütze-Engler-Weber-Verlag, Dresden 2008, S. 94–94, ISBN 978-3-936203-11-0.
- Andreas Laube: Die Errichtung der Verkehrswege und die Beförderung von Reisenden im Kirnitzschtal von Schandau nach dem Großen Wasserfall. in: Petra Binder (Hg.): Auf Straßen, Schienen und Wegen. Landkalenderbuch 2011 für die Sächsische Schweiz und das Osterzgebirge. Schütze-Engler-Weber-Verlag, Dresden 2010, S. 130–138, ISBN 978-3-936203-14-1
- Manfred Schober: Flößerei auf der Kirnitzsch. In: Petra Binder (Hg.): Vom Berg zum Tal - Wasser, die zur Elbe fließen. Landkalenderbuch für die Sächsische Schweiz und das Osterzgebirge 2009. Schütze-Engler-Weber-Verlag, Dresden 2008, S. 23–28, ISBN 978-3-936203-11-0.
