= Hohnstein =

- Town
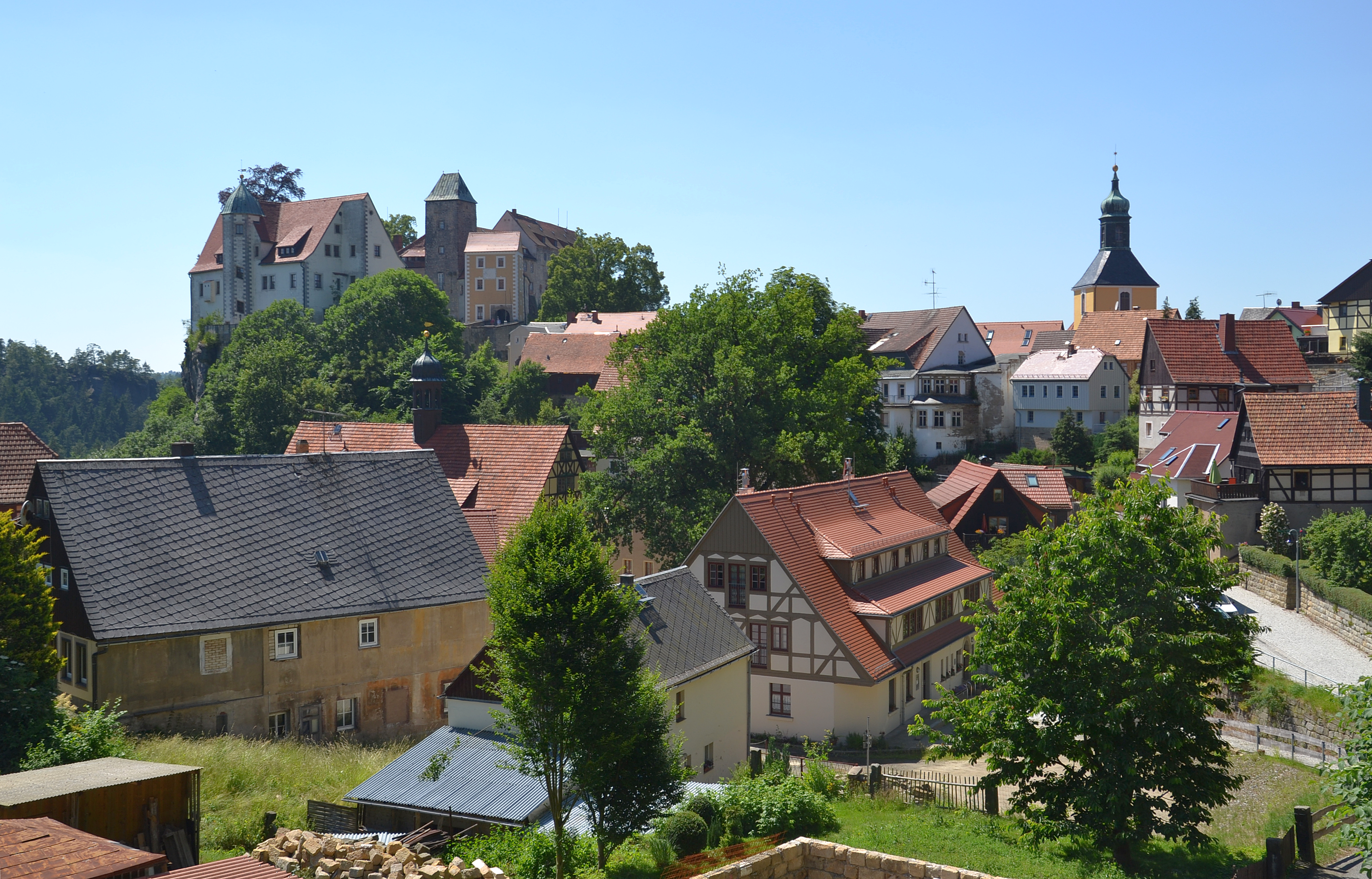
- General view of the town

- Coat of arms

- Location of Hohnstein within Sächsische Schweiz-Osterzgebirge district
- Interactive map of Hohnstein
- Location within Germany Location within Saxony
- Coordinates: 50°59′N 14°07′E
- Country: Germany
- State: Saxony
- District: Sächsische Schweiz-Osterzgebirge

Government
  - Mayor (2022–29): Daniel Brade

Area
  - Total: 64.64 km^{2} (24.96 sq mi)
- Elevation: 330 m (1,080 ft)

Population (2025-12-31)
  - Total: 3,076
  - Density: 47.59/km^{2} (123.2/sq mi)
- Time zone: UTC+01:00 (CET)
  - Summer (DST): UTC+02:00 (CEST)
- Postal codes: 01848
- Dialling codes: 035975
- Vehicle registration: PIR
- Website: www.hohnstein.de

Hohnstein (German pronunciation: [ˈhoːnˌʃtaɪn]) is a town located in the Sächsische Schweiz-Osterzgebirge district of Saxony, in eastern Germany. As of 2020, its population numbered a total of 3,262.

== Geography ==
It is situated in Saxon Switzerland, 12 km east of Pirna, and 28 km southeast of Dresden (centre). It is dominated by its castle, standing on a sandstone rock.

The municipal territory includes the villages (Ortsteile) of Cunnersdorf, Ehrenberg, Goßdorf, Lohsdorf, Rathewalde, Ulbersdorf and Waitzdorf.

== History ==
In 1900, the town had a population of 1,321.

During the German invasion of Poland at the start of World War II, in September 1939, the Oflag IV-A prisoner-of-war camp for Polish officers was established at the local castle, and from 1940 it also held French and Belgian officers and orderlies. In 1941, the Oflag IV-A was dissolved, and the Stalag IV-A POW camp was relocated to Hohnstein from Elsterhorst. It held Polish, French, British, Belgian, Serbian, Dutch, Soviet, Italian, American, Slovak, Czech and Bulgarian POWs, and was liberated by the Soviets in April 1945.

== Gallery ==
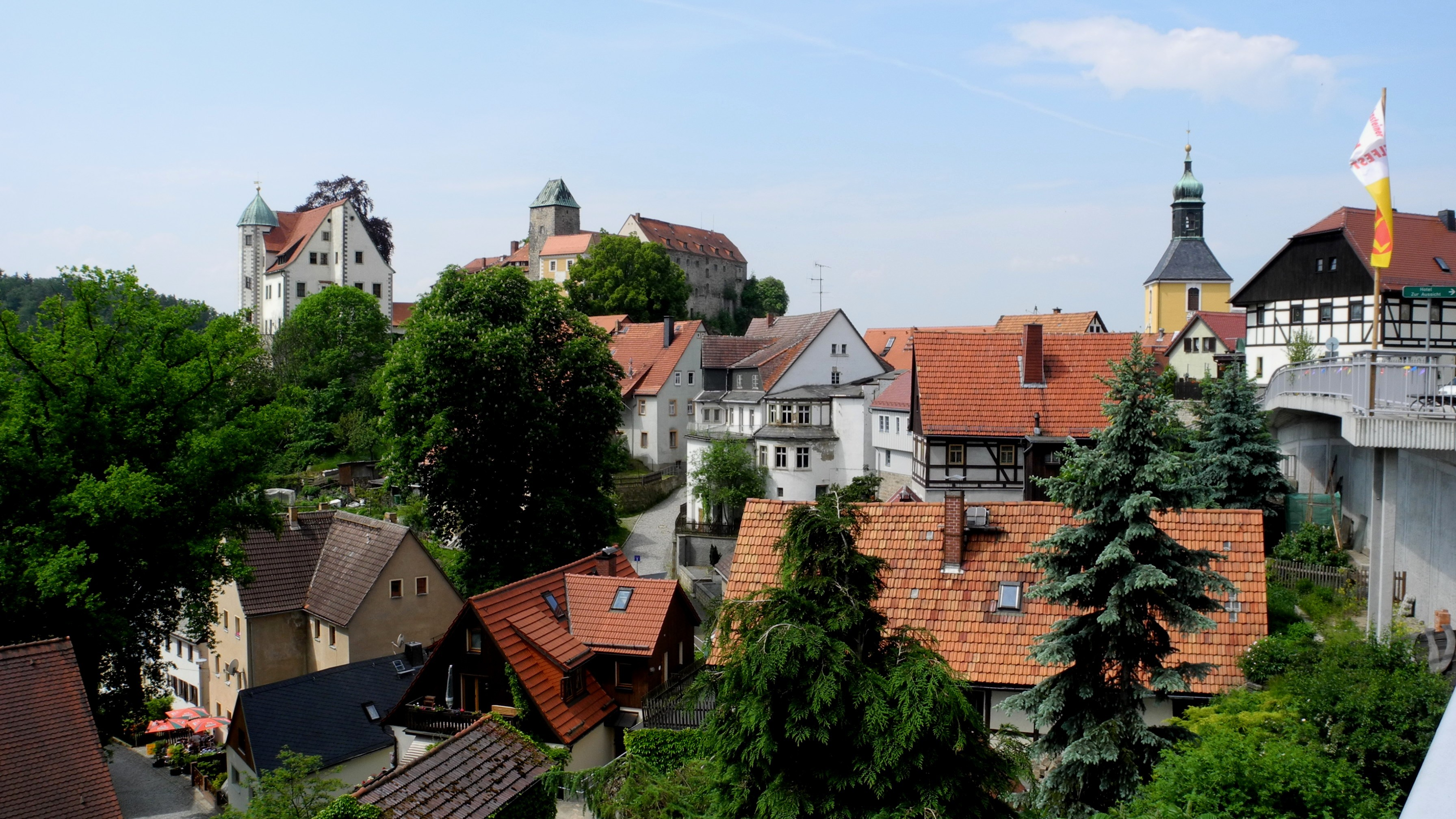
View of the town and the castle.

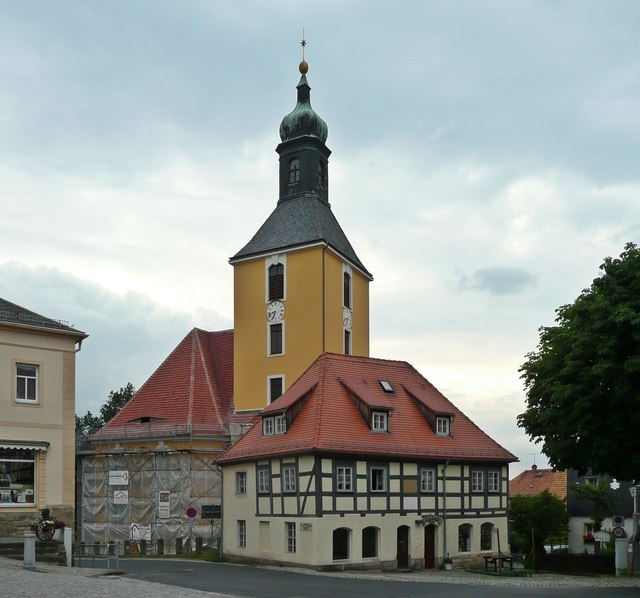
Town's church

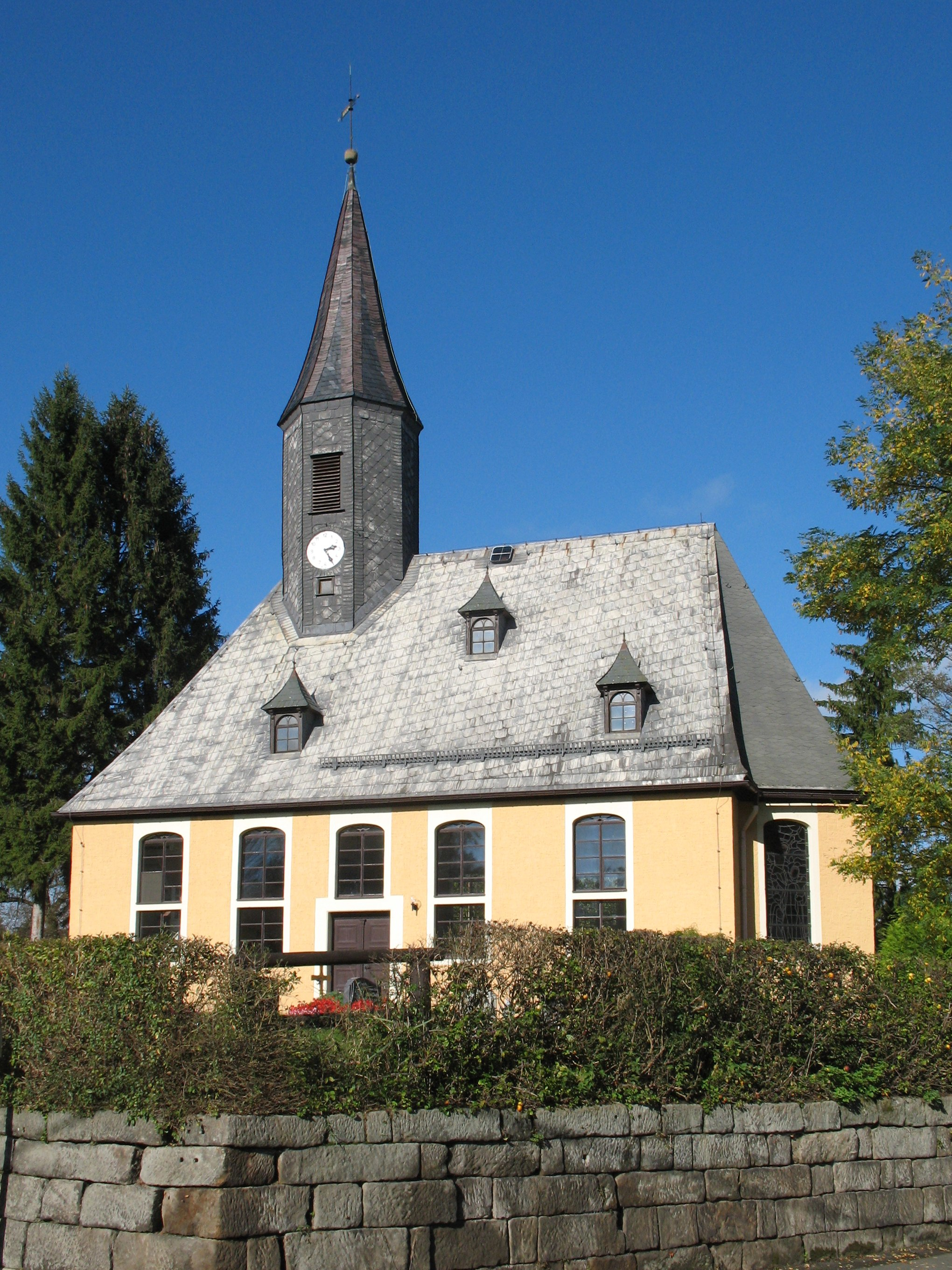
Church in Rathewalde

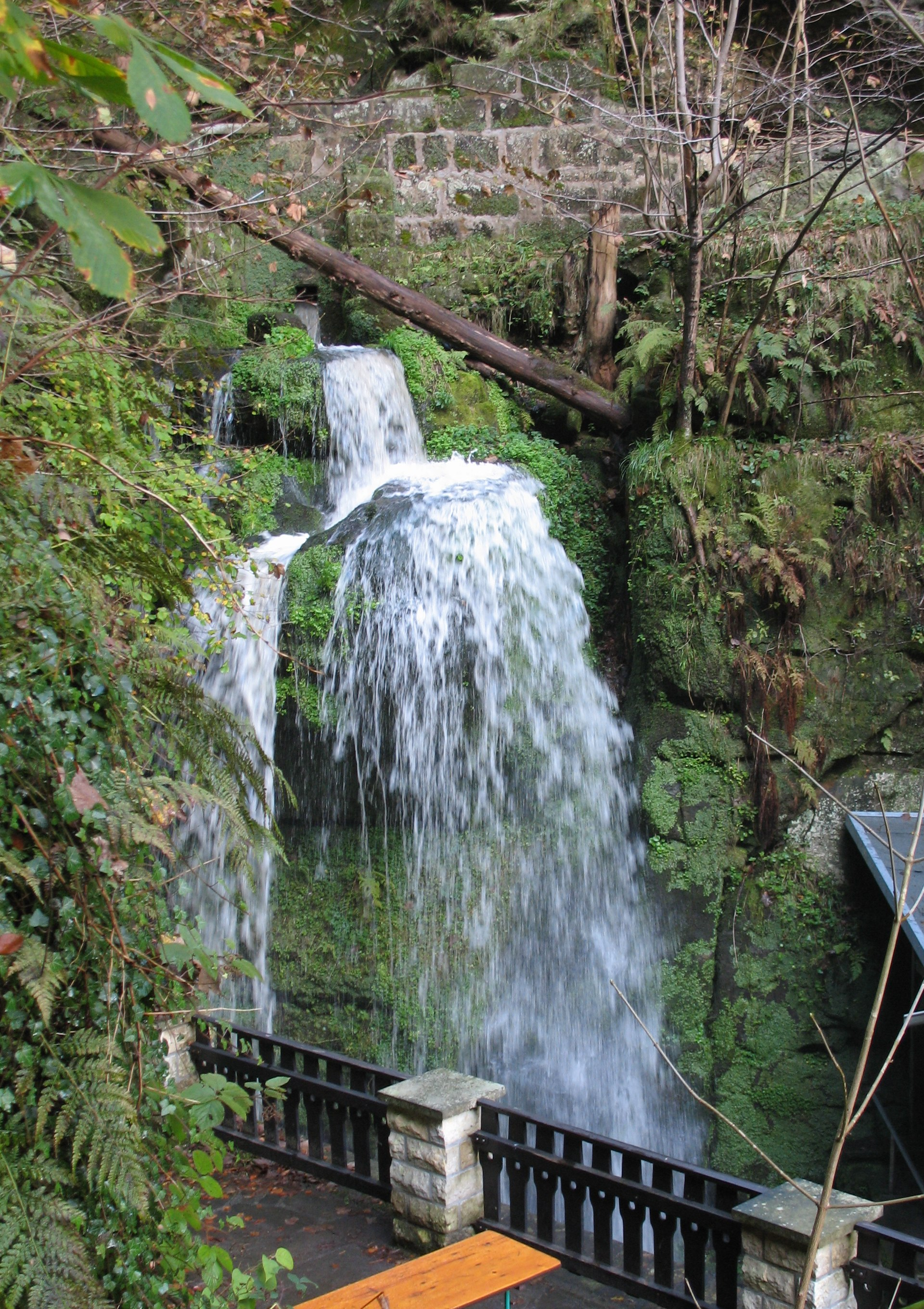
The Amsel Falls near Rathewalde

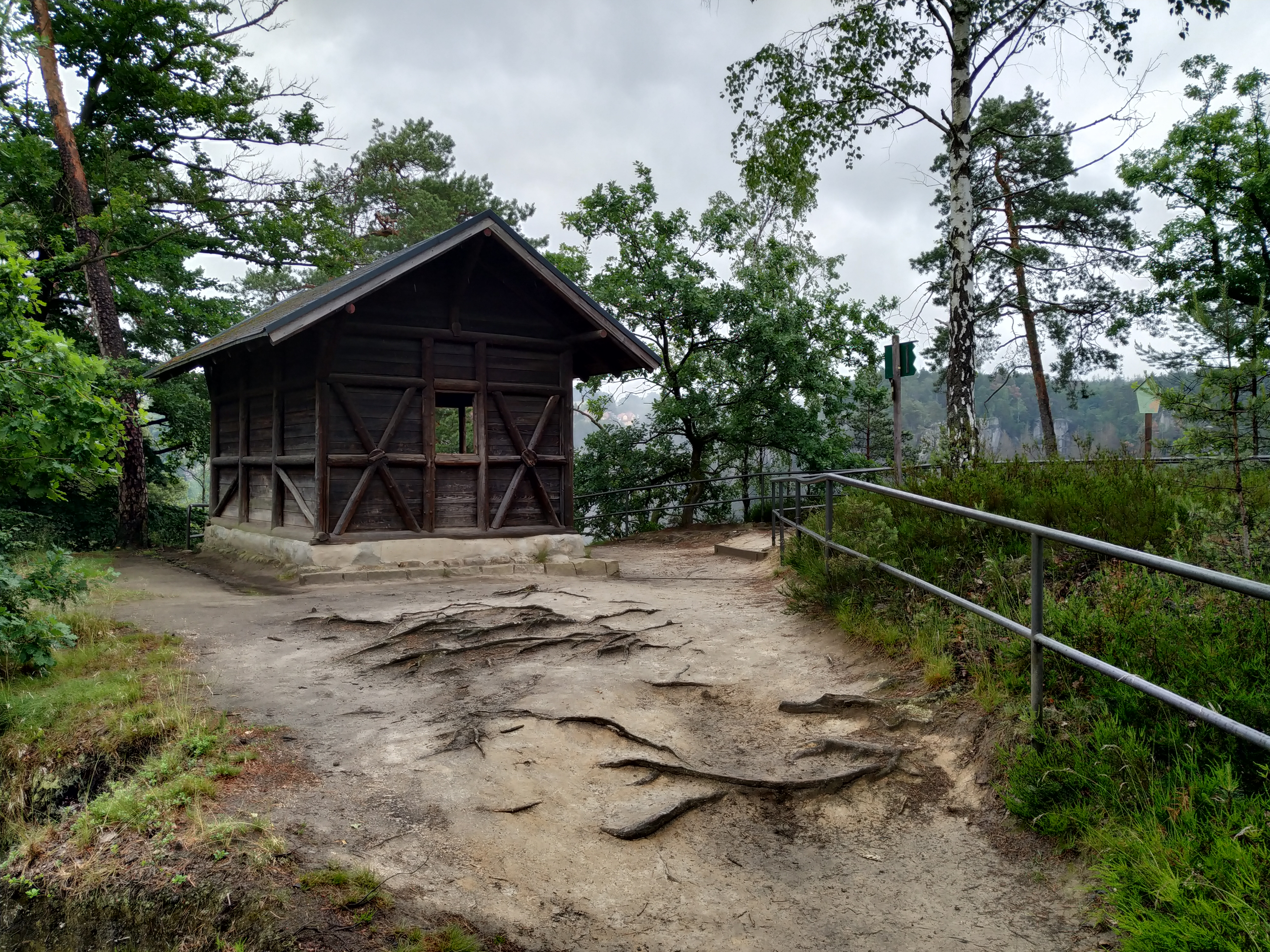
Shelter on the Hockstein in the Saxon Switzerland National Park

== See also ==
- Hohnstein Castle (Saxon Switzerland)
- Schwarzbach Railway
- Goßdorf-Kohlmühle railway station
- Ulbersdorf railway station
