= Ulbersdorf =

- Ortsteil of Hohnstein
- Interactive map of Ulbersdorf
- Location within Germany Location within Saxony
- Coordinates: 50°57′40″N 14°12′40″E
- Country: Germany
- State: Saxony
- District: Sächsische Schweiz-Osterzgebirge
- Town: Hohnstein

Area
  - Total: 8.46 km^{2} (3.27 sq mi)
- Elevation: 282 m (925 ft)
- Time zone: UTC+01:00 (CET)
  - Summer (DST): UTC+02:00 (CEST)
- Postal codes: 01848
- Dialling codes: 035975
- Vehicle registration: PIR

Ulbersdorf is a village in Saxon Switzerland in the district of Sächsische Schweiz-Osterzgebirge in southeastern Saxony, Germany. It was mentioned first in 1432 as Olbersdorff and is part of the town of Hohnstein since 1994.

== Geography ==
Ulbersdorf has the form of a Reihendorf (row village) and is located in the eastern part of the municipality on a plateau and its neighbouring side valley of the Sebnitz. The village is situated about 10 km southeast of the town centre of Hohnstein and about 5 km of the centre of the neighbouring town Sebnitz.

Surrounding villages are Krumhermsdorf (N), Schönbach (NE), Hainersdorf (E), Lichtenhain (SE), Mittelndorf (S), Altendorf (SW), Goßdorf and Lohsdorf (W).

Ulbersdorf railway station lies on the Bautzen–Bad Schandau railway.

== History ==
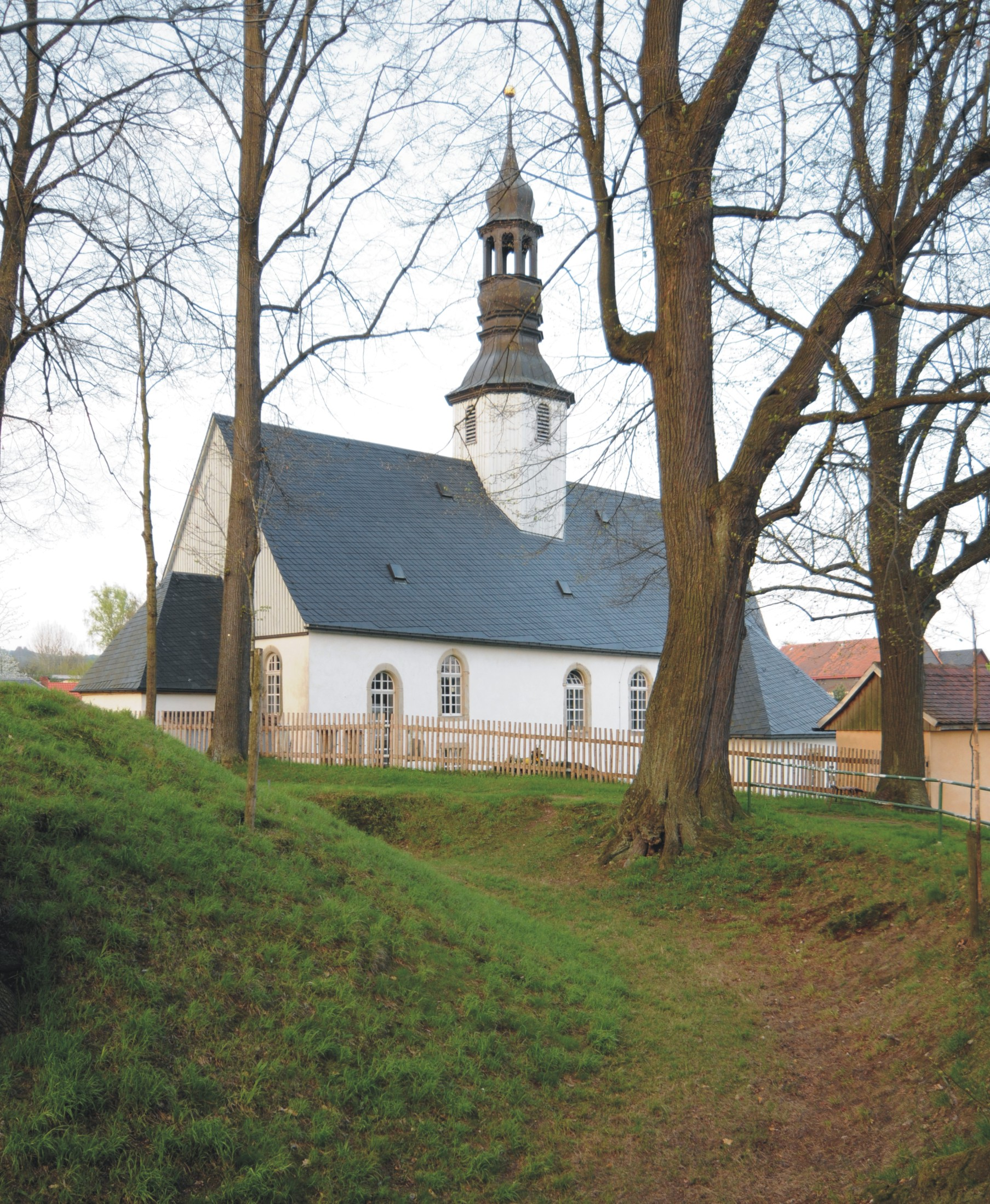
Ulbersdorf church

Ulbersdorf has been founded as a Waldhufendorf during the second phase of the German eastward expansion. It was first mentioned in 1432, in 1433 the church from the 12th/13th century was first mentioned, too. A 1433 mentioned vorwerk became a manor in the 16th century and even a second manor was built. For most of the time both manors belonged to the same families.

Wolf Adolf August von Lüttichau (1786–1863) was born in Ulbersdorf. He became later intendant of the Saxon State Theatre in Dresden. He and his wife Ida von Lüttichau (1798–1856) used Ulbersdorf manor as a second residence.

In 1877 the Bautzen–Bad Schandau railway line was built between the Upper Lusatian town Bautzen and Schandau at the river Elbe. Ulbersdorf railway station was located outside the village.

A World War I memorial was built in 1923. Additions were made to it after World War II.

In 1947 a land reform happened in Ulbersdorf like in most municipalities within the Soviet occupation zone.

On 1 January 1994 the municipalities Ehrenberg, Goßdorf, Lohsdorf, Rathewalde and Ulbersdorf were incorporated into the town of Hohnstein.

== Literature ==
- Ulbersdorf, Krs. Sebnitz, in: Zwischen Sebnitz, Hinterhermsdorf und den Zschirnsteinen (= Werte der deutschen Heimat. Band 2). Akademie Verlag, Berlin 1959, pp 37–39.
