= Lichtenhain =

Lichtenhain may refer to:

- Lichtenhain (Sebnitz), a village in the town of Sebnitz, Saxony
- Lichtenhain/Bergbahn, a former municipality in the district Saalfeld-Rudolstadt, now part of Oberweißbach, Thuringia

== See also ==
- Lichtenhain Waterfall, a water fall near Lichtenhain (Sebnitz)
