= Hohnstein Castle (Saxon Switzerland) =

Castle

- Burg Hohnstein
- Hohnstein
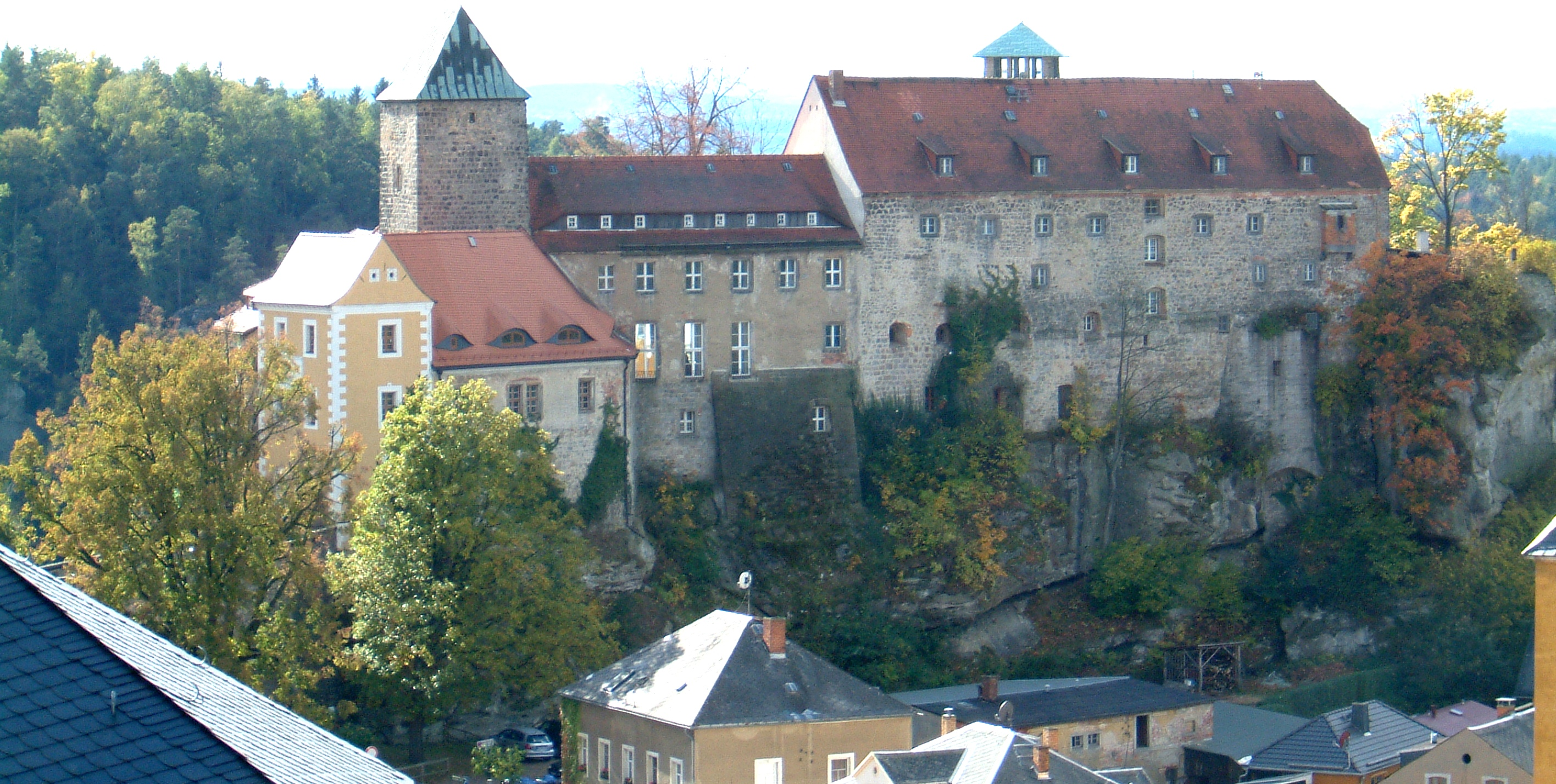
- Burg Hohnstein

Site information
- Type: hill castle, rock castle
- Code: DE-SN
- Condition: preserved or largely preserved

Location
- Coordinates: 50°58′47″N 14°06′34″E

Site history
- Built: around 1200

Garrison information
- Occupants: Nobility

Hohnstein Castle (German: Burg Hohnstein) is a medieval castle in the village of the same name, Hohnstein in Saxon Switzerland in the Free State of Sachsen in eastern Germany.

== Location ==
The castle is located on a hard sandstone slab, 140 metres above the Polenz valley and is the major landmark of the small town.

== History ==
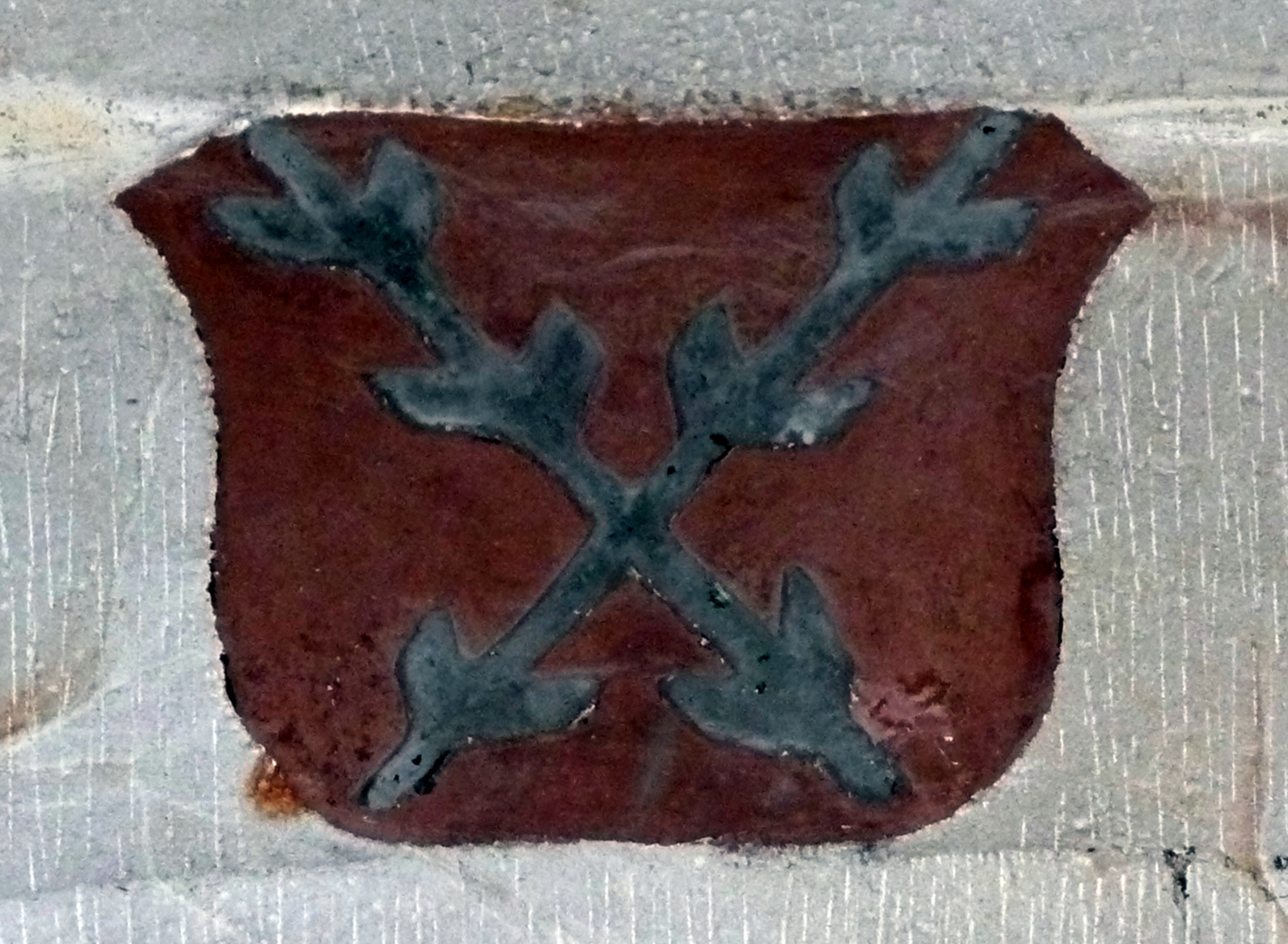
Coat of arms of the Berka of Dubá and Lipa over the entrancweay to the second courtyard

Hohnstein Castle was probably built around 1200 or earlier as a Bohemian border fortress for the Margravate of Meissen to defend it against Saxony. In 1353 the castle went into the possession of the Bohemian nobleman, Hynek Berka of Dubá, whose coat of arms with crossed oak branches decorates the entranceway to the second courtyard. In 1443 the Berkas of Dubá lost the estate through exchanges and purchase, only mentioned for the first time under their name, to the Electorate of Saxony under Frederick the Humble, although it remained a Bohemian fief until 1806. The Wettins used it as a base for hunting and for salmon spearing (Lachsstechen).

In the succeeding centuries the castle acted alternately as a seat of administration (electoral Amt), a court and a prison. The original wooden structures were gradually replaced during the 17th and 18th centuries by the present stone buildings and even successfully withstood a Swedish siege in 1639.

After the dissolution of the Amt in 1861 the castle served as a men's correctional institute (Männerkorrektionsanstalt) and from 1919 as a juvenile prison.

In 1925 the mighty castle became a youth hostel (Jugendburg) and was one of the largest and most attractive youth hostels in Germany (with about 1,000 bedspaces). The Hohnsteiner Kasper puppet theatre is named after the town and castle and put on its first performance in 1928 in the castle. In the years 1933/34 a Nazi concentration camp was established here for so-called protective custody prisoners (Schutzhäftlinge), in practice 5,600 political prisoners. During the German invasion of Poland at the start of World War II, in September 1939, the Oflag IV-A prisoner-of-war camp for Polish officers was established in the castle, and from 1940 it also held French and Belgian officers and orderlies. In 1941, the Oflag IV-A was dissolved, and the Stalag IV-A POW camp was relocated to the castle from Elsterhorst. It held Polish, French, British, Belgian, Serbian, Dutch, Soviet, Italian, American, Slovak, Czech and Bulgarian POWs, and was liberated by the Soviets in April 1945. After the war it was a refuge for displaced persons. From 1949 it was extended to become the largest youth hostel in the GDR; at the end of the SED rule an internment camp for 890 political opponents was planned. In 1953 the National Science Museum for Geology, Botany, Zoology and Ecology of the countryside was established here. In 1997 the castle was turned into a Friends of Nature house and youth guest house, to which the museum belongs today.

== Site ==
Access to the castle is only possible from the market square (Marktplatz) in Hohnstein. Of the once numerous castles east of the Elbe in Saxon Switzerland, Hohnstein is the only one that has survived intact.

== Sources ==
- A. Bergmann: Hohnstein. in: Alfred Meiche: Burgen und vorgeschichtliche Wohnstätten der sächsischen Schweiz. Dresden 1907, p. 236-259
- Matthias Donath: Schlösser in der Sächsischen Schweiz und im Osterzgebirge. edition Sächsische Zeitung, Meißen 2006
- Winfried Pätzold: Burg Hohnstein. Reihe "Der historische Ort" No. 51, Berlin 1999
- Manfred Schober: Die ehemalige St.-Anna-Kapelle auf der Burg Hohnstein. in: Mitteilungsheft des Arbeitskreises Sächsische Schweiz im Landesverband Sächsischer Heimatschutz, Band 3, Pirna 2006, p. 17-23
- Gebiet Königstein, Sächsische Schweiz. Edition no. 1 Akademie-Verlag Berlin, Berlin 1957 (Werte der deutschen Heimat. Vol. 1).
