= Mittelndorf =

- Ortsteil of Sebnitz
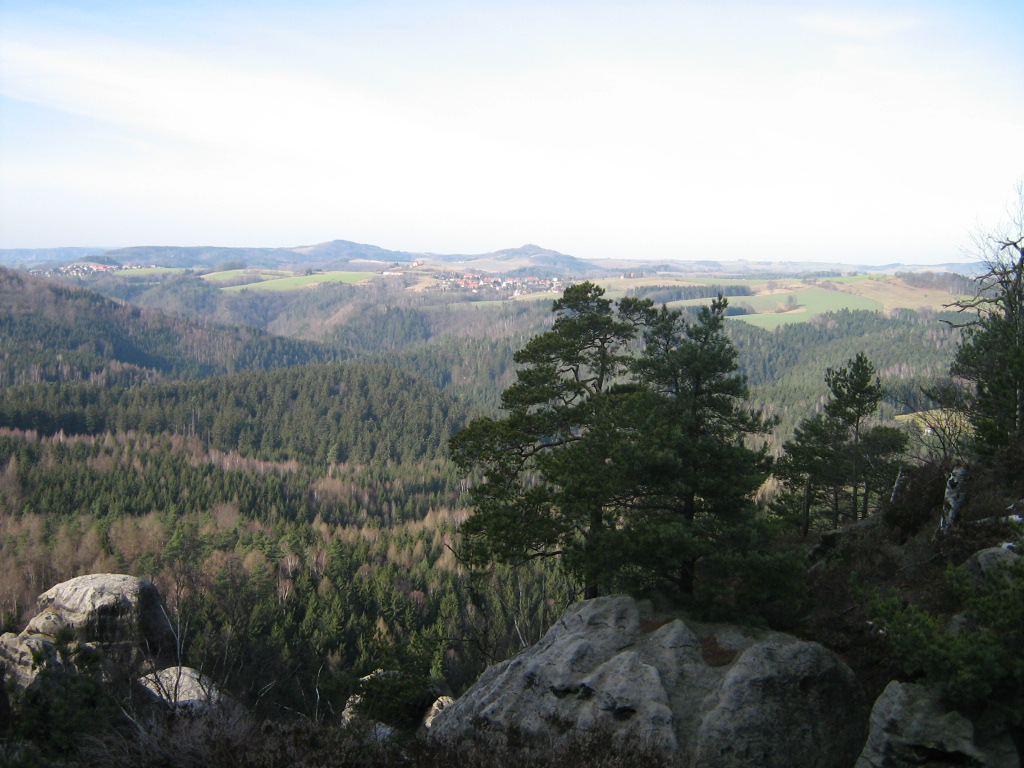
- Panoramic view from the Affensteine
- Interactive map of Mittelndorf
- Location within Germany Location within Saxony
- Coordinates: 50°56′14.4″N 14°12′16.8″E
- Country: Germany
- State: Saxony
- District: Sächsische Schweiz-Osterzgebirge
- Municipality: Sebnitz

Area
  - Total: 5.36 km^{2} (2.07 sq mi)
- Elevation: 320 m (1,050 ft)

Population (2007)
  - Total: 500
  - Density: 93/km^{2} (240/sq mi)
- Demonym: Mittelndorfer
- Time zone: UTC+01:00 (CET)
  - Summer (DST): UTC+02:00 (CEST)
- Postal codes: 15366
- Dialling codes: 035971 - 035022
- Vehicle registration: PIR
- Website: Municipal site

Mittelndorf is a village in Saxony, Germany, situated in the district of Sächsische Schweiz-Osterzgebirge. It was one of the villages that composed the municipality of Kirnitzschtal. Since 1 October 2012, it is part of the town Sebnitz.

== History ==
The oldest structure of the village is the mill (Mittelndorfer Mühle), built in 1518.

== Geography ==
Mittelndorf is located in the mountain range of Saxon Switzerland, not too far from the river Kirnitzsch. It lies on the S154 road, which links Bad Schandau and Sebnitz, between the villages of Altendorf and Lichtenhain. It is 8 kilometres (5.0 mi) from Sebnitz and Bad Schandau, 25 kilometres (16 mi) from Pirna, 27 kilometres (17 mi) from Děčín (in the Czech Republic) and circa 50 kilometres (31 mi) from Dresden.

== Climate ==
Climate data for Mittelndorf (1991–2020 normals)
Month	Jan	Feb	Mar	Apr	May	Jun	Jul	Aug	Sep	Oct	Nov	Dec	Year
Mean daily maximum °C (°F)	1.8 (35.2)	3.4 (38.1)	7.7 (45.9)	13.8 (56.8)	18.3 (64.9)	21.5 (70.7)	23.8 (74.8)	23.6 (74.5)	18.4 (65.1)	12.5 (54.5)	6.4 (43.5)	2.6 (36.7)	12.8 (55.0)
Daily mean °C (°F)	−0.5 (31.1)	0.5 (32.9)	3.8 (38.8)	8.9 (48.0)	13.2 (55.8)	16.4 (61.5)	18.5 (65.3)	18.2 (64.8)	13.7 (56.7)	8.9 (48.0)	4.1 (39.4)	0.5 (32.9)	8.9 (48.0)
Mean daily minimum °C (°F)	−2.8 (27.0)	−2.2 (28.0)	0.3 (32.5)	4.0 (39.2)	8.0 (46.4)	11.3 (52.3)	13.2 (55.8)	13.0 (55.4)	9.5 (49.1)	5.8 (42.4)	1.9 (35.4)	−1.5 (29.3)	5.0 (41.0)
Average precipitation mm (inches)	62.5 (2.46)	44.8 (1.76)	54.4 (2.14)	38.2 (1.50)	66.3 (2.61)	86.7 (3.41)	94.6 (3.72)	92.9 (3.66)	60.9 (2.40)	60.7 (2.39)	58.5 (2.30)	61.4 (2.42)	791.5 (31.16)
Average precipitation days (≥ 1.0 mm)	17.8	15.2	16.4	12.0	14.2	14.5	14.8	13.4	12.9	14.7	15.4	17.3	179.8
Average snowy days (≥ 1.0 cm)	14.8	13.0	7.2	0.9	0	0	0	0	0	0.1	3.5	11.0	50.5
Average relative humidity (%)	84.0	79.7	75.5	67.8	69.6	70.5	70.0	71.0	76.8	81.3	85.7	85.8	76.5
Mean monthly sunshine hours	46.3	72.6	124.0	187.4	214.5	209.0	221.6	218.2	157.6	101.1	47.0	39.6	1,644.1
Source: World Meteorological Organisation

== Transport ==
Mittelndorf has got a rail stop on the Bautzen–Bad Schandau railway, situated in the forest close to the village. This stop has a rare peculiarity for a train station situated on a normal national rail line: it has not a road to reach it but a simple forest trail. A similar thing in Europe could be found, for example, in the stations of Kloster Marienthal (Engers-Au line, Germany); Pertosa, in southern Italy; or Corrour, in Scotland.

The village is also served by the suburban tramway line "Kirnitzschtalbahn" Bad Schandau–Lichtenhainer Wasserfall, with the stops of Mittelndorfer Mühle (at the mill) and Forsthaus, not too far from Mittelndorf.

== See also ==
- Mittelndorf railway station
