= Rainer Opitz =

German businessman, numismatist, and author (1954–2019)

- Born: 1954; Sebnitz
- Died: February 7, 2019 (aged 64–65)
- Alma mater: Humboldt University of Berlin
- Occupation: Businessperson, numismatist
- Rank: lieutenant colonel

Dr. Rainer Opitz (April 30, 1954 – February 7, 2019) — was a German businessman, numismatist, and author of numismatic catalogue "Reformatio in Nummis".

== Life and career ==
Rainer Opitz was born in Sebnitz, Germany. In 1981 he enrolled at Humboldt University in Berlin where he studied philosophy. After graduation from the university in 1985, from 1987 to 1990 Opitz pursued doctoral degree in the historic relationship between religion and the military.

After reunification of Germany Opitz took a job at commercial company in Bielefeld, where he worked until his resignation in 2001. He then founded his own company Promota GmbH, whose business success played a critical role in helping to assemble one of the largest collections of coins and medals dedicated to the history of the Reformation.
