= Kirnitzschtal =

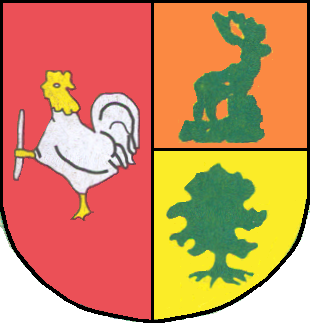
- Coat of arms
- Interactive map of Kirnitzschtal
- Location within Germany Location within Saxony
- Coordinates: 50°56′36″N 14°14′48″E
- Country: Germany
- State: Saxony
- District: Sächsische Schweiz-Osterzgebirge
- Disbanded: 1 October 2012

Area
  - Total: 44.17 km^{2} (17.05 sq mi)
- Elevation: 365 m (1,198 ft)

Population (2011-12-31)
  - Total: 2,083
  - Density: 47.16/km^{2} (122.1/sq mi)
- Time zone: UTC+01:00 (CET)
  - Summer (DST): UTC+02:00 (CEST)
- Postal codes: 01855
- Dialling codes: 035971 / 035022
- Vehicle registration: PIR
- Website: Official website

Kirnitzschtal is a former municipality in the Sächsische Schweiz-Osterzgebirge district, in Saxony, Germany. Since 1 October 2012, it is part of the town Sebnitz. It had its administrative seat in Lichtenhain.

The municipality was divided into the following 5 Ortsteile:

- Altendorf
- Mittelndorf
- Lichtenhain
- Ottendorf
- Saupsdorf

== Photogallery ==
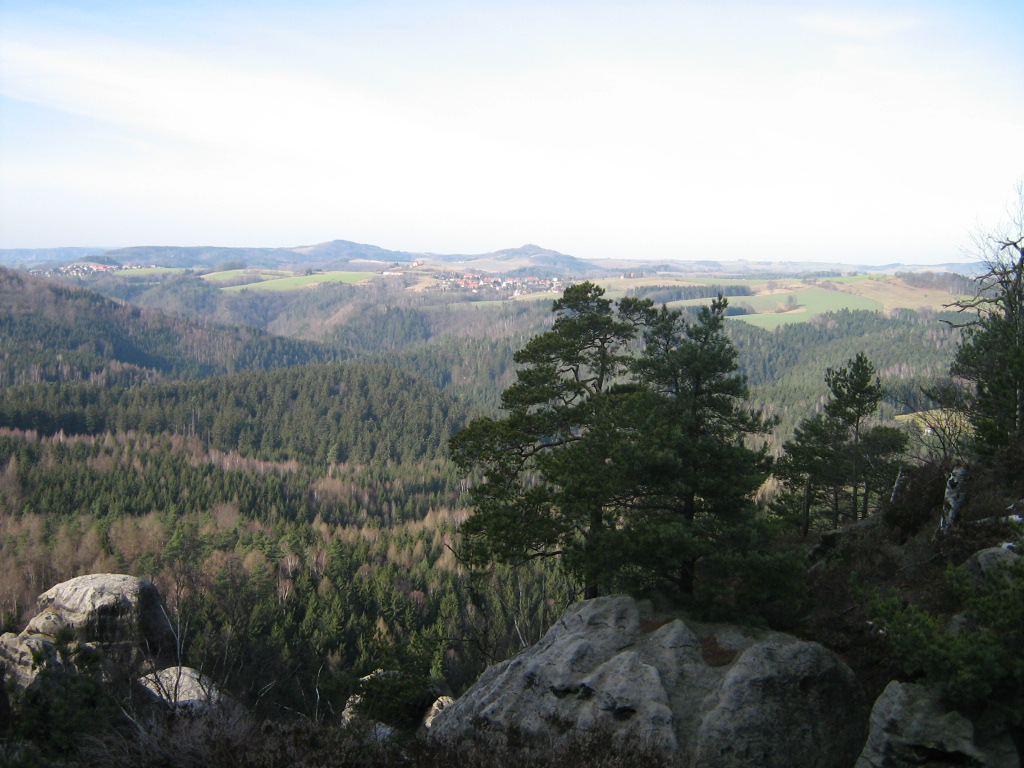
View of the Kirnitzschtal area from the Affensteine rocks

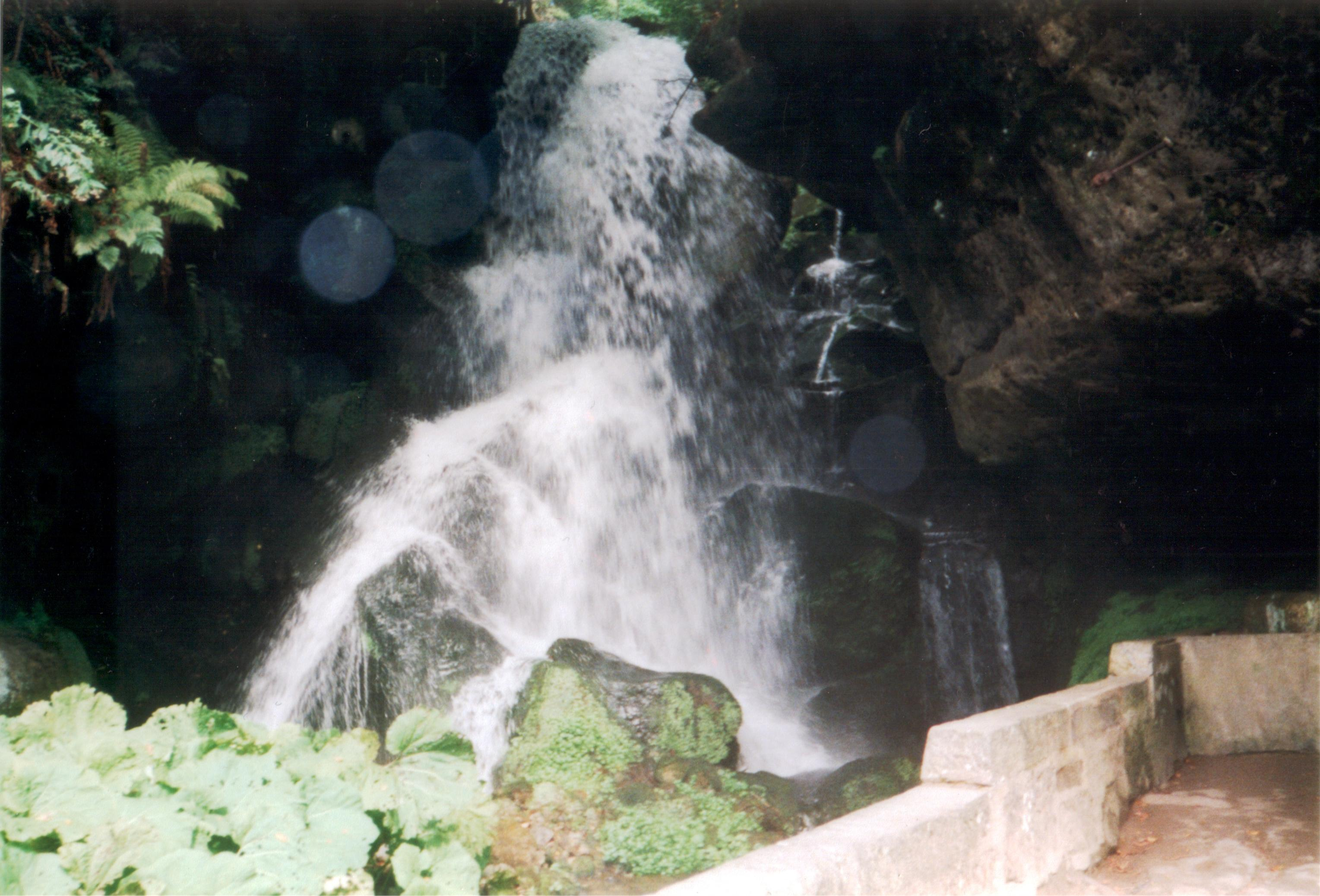
Lichtenhain Waterfall

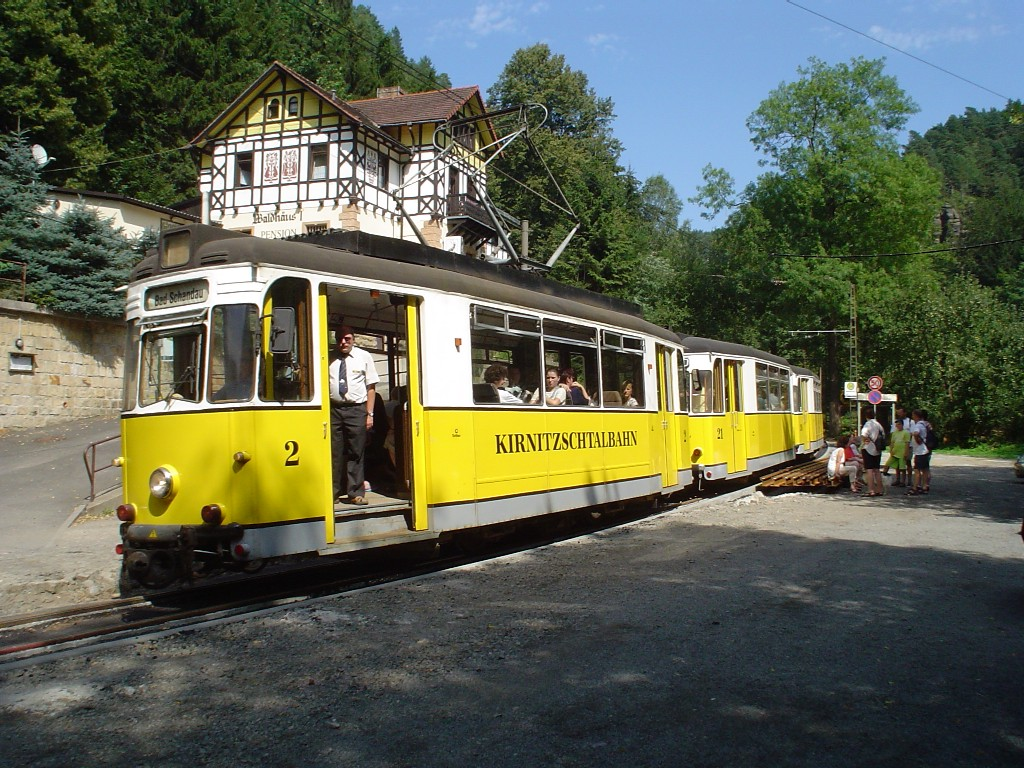
Kirnitzschtal Tramway at the Forsthaus halt near Mittelndorf

== See also ==
- Kirnitzschtal Tramway
- Lichtenhain Waterfall
