= Mittelndorf station =

Railway station in Saxony, Germany

Mittelndorf
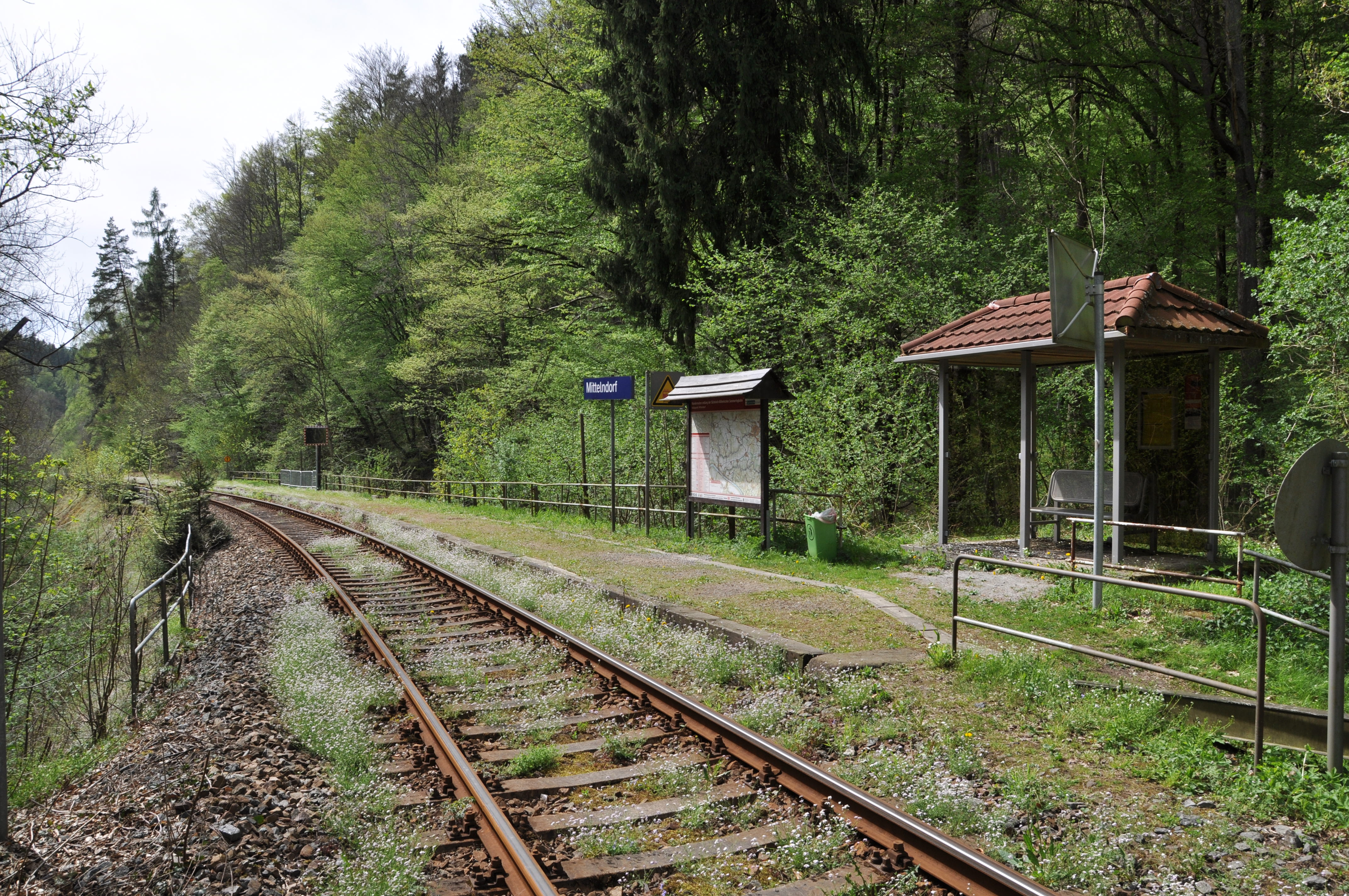
- Mittelndorf railway station

General information
- Location: Mittelndorf, Saxony, Germany
- Coordinates: 50°56′46″N 14°11′29″E
- Line: Bautzen–Bad Schandau railway
- Platforms: 1
- Tracks: 1

History
- Opened: 15 January 1904

Services
Preceding station	DB Regio Südost	Following station
Goßdorf-Kohlmühle towards Rumburk	U 28	Ulbersdorf towards Děčín main
Location
- Location within Saxony

Mittelndorf (German: Bahnhof Mittelndorf) is a railway station in the village of Mittelndorf, Saxony, Germany. The station lies on the Bautzen–Bad Schandau railway. The station is served by one train service, operated by DB Regio in cooperation with České dráhy: the National Park Railway. This service connects Děčín and Rumburk via Bad Schandau and Sebnitz.

== Overview ==
The station counts a single platform and is situated in the forest close to the village. Mittelndorf station has a rare peculiarity for a train station situated on a normal national rail line: it has not a road to reach it but a simple forest trail. A similar thing in Europe could be found, for example, in the stations of Kloster Marienthal (Engers-Au line, Germany); Pertosa, in southern Italy; or Corrour, in Scotland.
