= Angel Church, Hinterhermsdorf =

Coordinates: 50°55′28″N 14°21′39″E

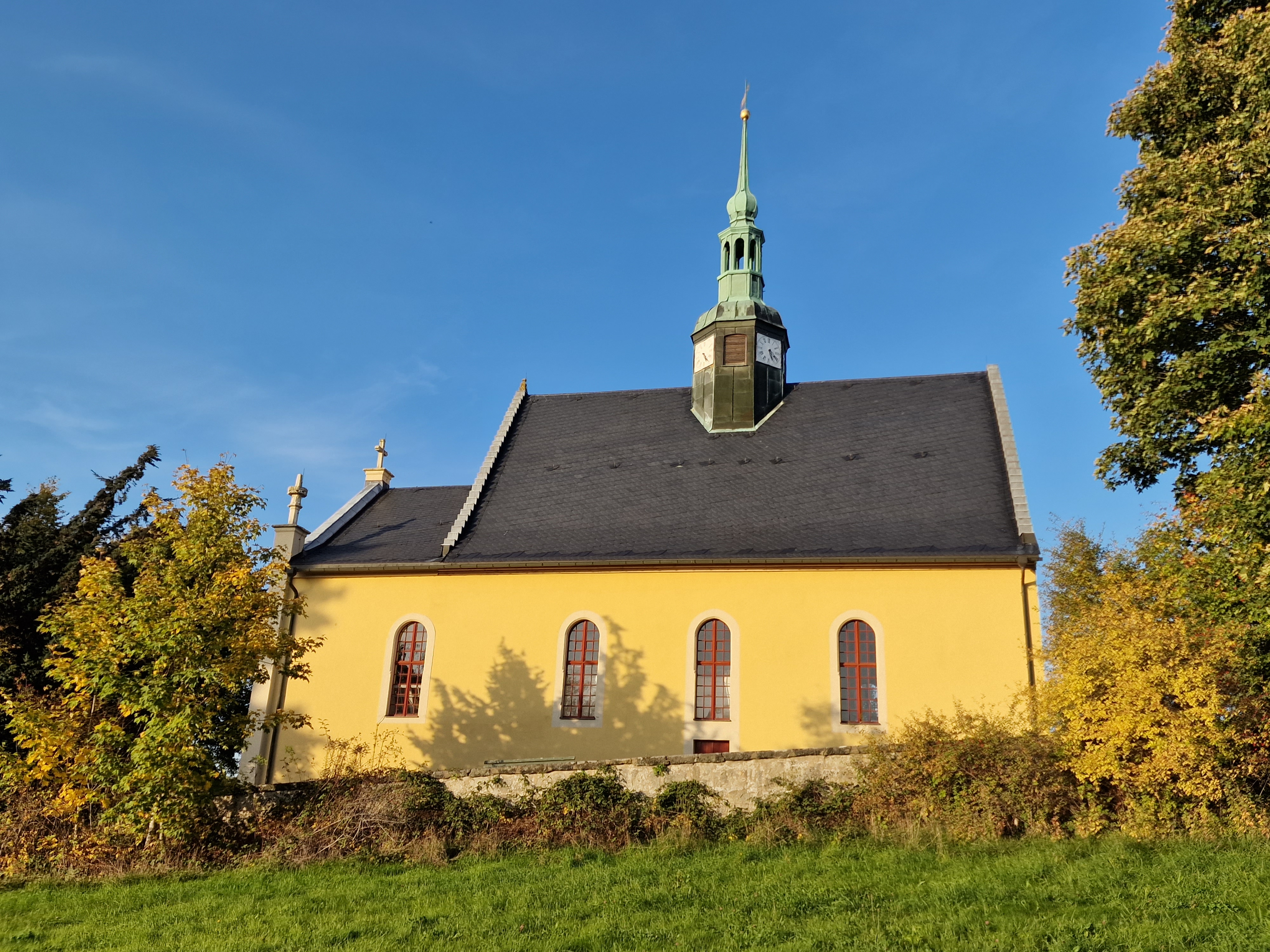
View of All Angels

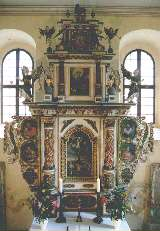
The Baroque altar

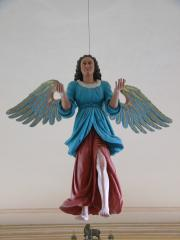
The baptismal angel

The Angel Church (German: Engelkirche) is an Evangelical-Lutheran church in Hinterhermsdorf which overlooks this Saxon village. Its name, unusual for a Protestant church, comes from the Baroque baptismal angel that decorates the interior.

== Description ==
Angel Church is an aisleless church with a straight apse (Schluss) and arched windows. It supports a gabled roof with a flèche that is decorated by a lantern. The interior has a Baroque three-winged altar (probably by a Bohemian master craftsman) dated 1681 to 1692 and by a Baroque baptismal angel, which gives the church its name. The 1846 organ was built by Samuel Heinrich Herold.

== History ==
The Angel Church was built after 1688 on a rise above Hinterhermsdorf. The architect was Hans Hamann from Tharandt. In 1846 there were numerous modifications that were largely reverted during alterations in 1939. At the end of the 1970s restoration work began that was finished in 1988.
