= Oflag IV-A =

World War II German prisoner-of-war camp

- Hohnstein, Saxony
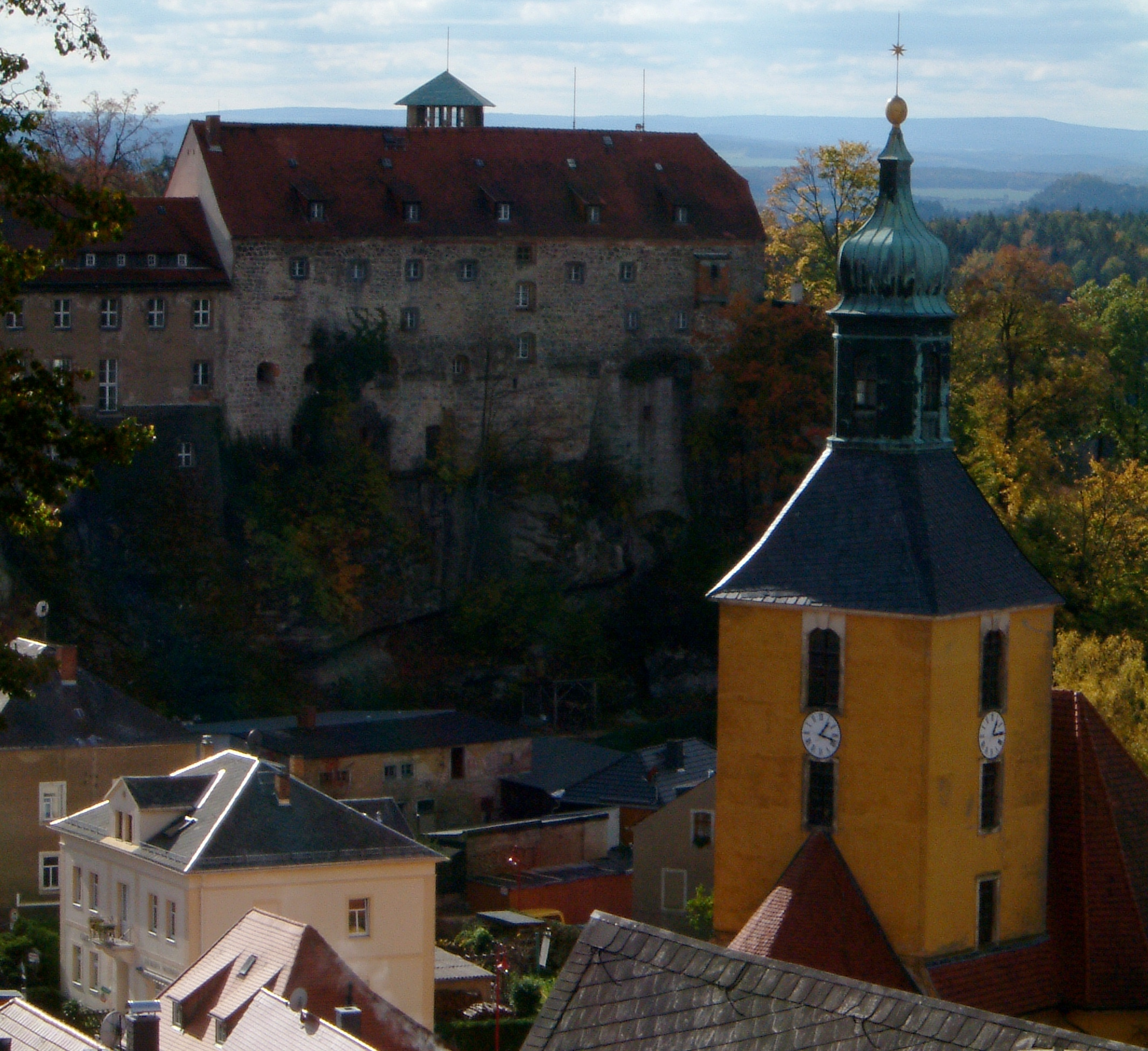
- Burg Hohnstein, with the village of Hohnstein in the foreground

Site information
- Type: Prisoner-of-war camp
- Controlled by: Nazi Germany

Location
- Hohnstein, Germany (pre-war borders, 1937)
- Location within Germany
- Coordinates: 50.97966°N 14.10923°E

Site history
- In use: 1939-1940

Garrison information
- Occupants: Polish and French officers

Oflag IV-A was a World War II German POW camp for officers located in the 15th-century Burg Hohnstein, in Hohnstein, Saxony.

== Camp history ==
The castle was first used as a camp in 1933–34, named KZ Hohnstein. As a Schutzhaftlager ("protective custody camp"), it held political prisoners, mostly members of the Communist Party, who were forced to work in a nearby quarry.

The camp was reopened on 1 October 1939 to house Polish generals and their staffs captured during the German September 1939 offensive. On 15 May 1940 most of them were transferred to Oflag IV-B Koenigstein.

By September 1940 the prisoners at the camp were mainly French, with 100 officers up the rank of colonel, and 28 generals. There were also seven Dutch and 27 Polish generals, with orderlies. By the end of October 1940 all these prisoners had been transferred to other camps, and the castle was then used to accommodate evacuee children from Hamburg and Berlin.

German records indicate the camp was in existence until April 1945.

Post-war it housed refugees and displaced persons until 1948.

== Prominent inmates ==
- General Juliusz Rómmel
- General Tadeusz Kutrzeba
- General Walerian Czuma
- General Edmund Knoll-Kownacki
- General Franciszek Kleeberg
- General Emil Krukowicz-Przedrzymirski (7 July - 29 October 1940)

== See also ==
- Oflag
- List of prisoner-of-war camps in Germany
- Kemna concentration camp
