= La Voce della Patria =

1943–44 Italian-language newspaper

- October 24, 1943 issue of La Voce della Patria
- Publisher: Guido Tonella
- Founded: October 3, 1943
- Ceased publication: September 18, 1944
- Political alignment: Fascist
- Language: Italian
- City: Berlin, Germany
- Circulation: 40,000–50,000
- OCLC number: 472931087

La Voce della Patria (lit. 'The Voice of the Fatherland' in Italian) was an Italian-language weekly newspaper published in Berlin from 1943 to 1944. It was an organ of the Republican Fascists Abroad and Overseas, published by the Italian Social Republic (RSI) Berlin embassy for distributed in camps of Italian Military Internees (IMI) in Germany following the September 3, 1943 armistice between the Kingdom of Italy and the Allied powers.

The journalist Guido Tonella, who had been the correspondent of La Stampa, was the publisher of La Voce della Patria. The editorial office of La Voce della Patria was located at Victoriastrasse 10. It was printed by Deutscher Verlag.

The first issue of La Voce della Patria was published on October 3, 1943. 13 issues of the newspaper were published in 1943, whilst 37 issues were published in 1944. Issues of the newspaper were 46 cm.

The publication was the sole communication channel from the outside world to the IMI. La Voce della Patria sought to mobilize support for RSI among Italian internees, and argued that the German actions towards Italian soldiers were justified. It argued that Pietro Badoglio had betrayed Italy, and that Italian soldiers should remain loyal with their German allies. Particularly in the period of October–December 1943, the newspaper carried plenty of appeals for enlisting to support Germany either through joining the RSI armed forces or by joining labour units. The discourse of the publication invoked both moral arguments in favour of fascism as well as indications that enlisting could result in improved food rations or material conditions.

Some 40,000-50,000 copies of the issues of La Voce della Patria were distributed in the camps. Per testimonies of former camp detainees, the newspaper was frequently used as toilet paper.

The last issue of La Voce della Patria was published on September 18, 1944. In October 1944 La Voce della Patria was replaced by the biweekly Il Camerata ('The Comrade').
