= Ottendorf (Sebnitz) =

Village in Sebnitz, Saxony, Germany

Coordinates: 50.9444°N 14.2833°E

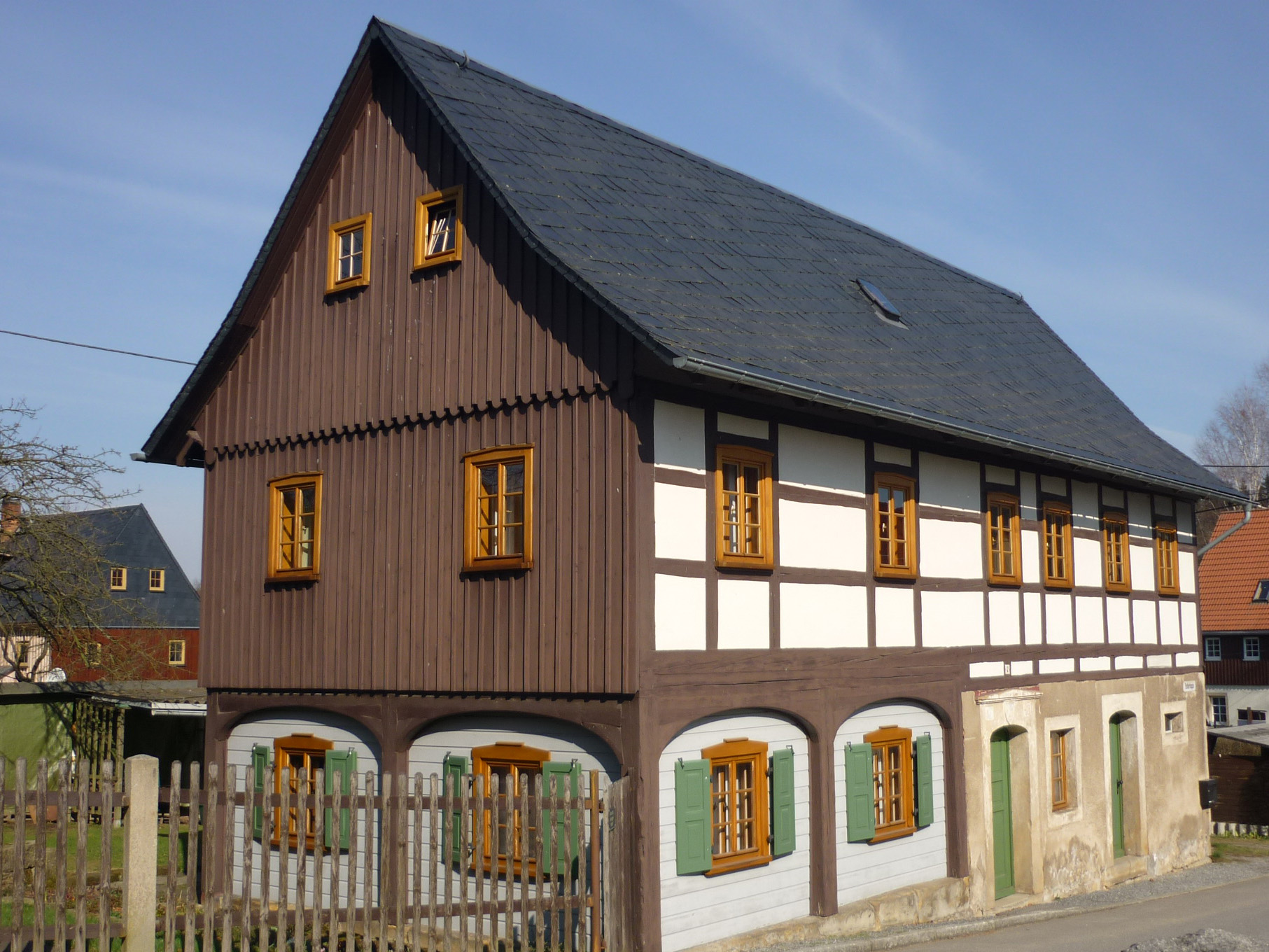
Umgebindehaus in Ottendorf (Kirnitzschtal), Endlerkuppe Nr. 7

Ottendorf (German pronunciation: [ˈɔtn̩dɔʁf]) is a village in Saxony, Germany, situated in the district of Sächsische Schweiz-Osterzgebirge. It was one of the villages that composed the municipality of Kirnitzschtal. Since 1 October 2012, it has been part of the municipality of Sebnitz.
