= Giuseppe Tontodonati =

Italian poet

- Born: February 2, 1917; Scafa, Italy
- Died: January 6, 1989 (aged 71); Bologna, Italy
- Occupation: Poet

Giuseppe Tontodonati (February 2, 1917 — January 6, 1989) was an Italian poet.

== Life ==
Giuseppe Tontodonati was born in Abruzzo, a region in central Italy in the town of Scafa (at that time part of San Valentino AC municipality) in the Pescara province in 1917. When he was a child, in 1925, he moved with his family to Pescara. In this large city he came into contact with local artists, being influenced by painting and poetry, choosing at the end poetry as his means of expression. (ref youth poems edit in Poesie Inedite on 1993)

From 1940 he was a soldier during World War II. On September 8, 1943, Italy signed the Armistice. Giuseppe Tontodonati at that time was in the city of Volos (Greece) and like many other Italian soldiers, was captured by the German Army and deported to Germany not as prisoners of war but as Italian Military Internees at first to the Stammlager IV/B Mühlberg-Elbe registered with number IV/B 244512, and then moved to the Lager IV/D in Turgau and then to Pieteritz / Wittenberg as soldier/worker IMI by the local Bayerische Stickstoff-Werke, until mid-1945. Several poems written by Tontodonati in these concentration camps, are a direct testimony of his terrible experience. He returned, skeletal in appearance, to Pescara in the autumn of 1945.

In 1959 he and his family moved to Bologna, where he lived until his death on January 6, 1989. Once in Bologna although he continued to write poems in Italian, he also began to write poems using Abruzzo dialect (see his first work, "Storie Paesane" written in 1958 with an introduction by the poet Antonio Rinaldi). Giuseppe Tontodonati participated very actively in the cultural life of Bologna coming into contact with the main local artists and intellectuals. He also founded and directed as President, the Centro Internazionale delle Arti – CIDA a cultural center of Arts active in Bologna from 1973 till 1985.

Although he is also highly appreciated as a poet in Italian, Giuseppe Tontodonati is mainly considered one of the most important Italian dialect poets of the 20th century. He also wrote texts for several folk songs set with the music of Giuseppe di Pasquale. Due to his strong commitment on celebrating the beauty of Abruzzo, the Regional Cultural Authority of the Abruzzo Region has included him among the top list of the top regional cultural testimonials. The Abruzzo Region Cultural Department twice, 1993 and in 2011, published collections of Tontodonati poems to commemorate his past activity. The last one, Da Lu Piccule Resurgemende a Porta Pije – L'Abruzzo dai moti carbonari all'Unità d'Italia fino a brigantaggio post-unitario (2011) has been included into the official activities of the 150th year of Italian nationhood celebration by the Abruzzo Region.

== Works ==
- "Storie paesane", 1968 – prefazione di Antonio Rinaldi – disegni di Renzo Magnanini – printed by Azzoguidi (Bologna)
- "Dommusè – Ballata Abruzzese", 1974 – prefazione di Giuseppe Rosato – printed by Itinerari Lanciano
- "Le Scafe", 1976 – printed by Stile (Bologna)
- "Canzoni abruzzesi", con musiche del M° Giuseppe Di Pasquale (Padre Donato), 1979, introduced by Ottaviano Giannageli and illustrated by Vito Giovannelli – printed by Solfanelli
- Inno a San Bernardino da Siena (1980) e "Lauda a San Giovanni da Capestrano" Saint John Capistran (1986) – text Giuseppe Tontodonati – music by Giuseppe Di Pasqual
- "Storie Paesane", 2° ed. 1979 – prefazione di Italo Ghignone – printed by La Regione (Pescara)
- "Terra Lundane", 1980 – prefazione di Italo Ghignone, printed by La Regione (Pescara)
- "Rapsodia (Il Guerriero di Capestrano)", silloge in lingua, 1982 – pref. di Italo Ghignone, printed by La Regione (Pescara) – this is the only book having poems in italian language and not in dialect.
- "Sa' Mmalindine",1983 – prefazione di Umberto Russo, printed by La Regione (Pescara)
- "Canzoniere d'Abruzzo – sonetti ed altre rime", 1986 - prefazione di Vittoriano Esposito, printed by La Regione (Pescara)

== Posthumous publications of unpublished material ==
- Musicassetta (songs) "10 Canti della Valpescara" (ten songs from Pescara walley) Musiche del M° Giuseppe di Pasquale versi di Giuseppe Tontodonati – Registrazione del Coro Valpescara diretto dal M° Giuseppe Di Pasquale 1992 –
- "Poesie inedite di Giuseppe Tontodonati", a cura di Vittoriano Esposito, edito dalla Regione Abruzzo, L’Aquila 1993

== Posthumous publications on topics linked to Canzoniere and Poesie Inedite ==
- "Vocabolarietto dell’uso Abruzzese – coinè dialettale Pescarese" – (Abruzzo Dialect – Italian Dictionary) a cura e con introduzione di Marcello M. de Giovanni – Ediz. Comune di Scafa – copertina di Pietro Cascella (2004)
- "Sam Biétre Céle" (Celestino V e l’Abruzzo) a cura di Umberto Russo e Marcello M. de Giovanni. Poems about the Pope Celestino V – Ediz. Assoc. Culturale “La Panarda” di Rosciano (PE) (2007)
- "Da Lu Piccule Resurgemende a Porta Pije – L'Abruzzo dai moti carbonari all'Unità d'Italia fino a brigantaggio post-unitario", con introduzione di Enzo Fimiani e commento di Giuseppe Parisio – edito dal Consiglio Regionale della Regione Abruzzo, 2011
- "Recurde Pescarise" all the poems written by Tontodonati about the city of Pescara. Illustrated by Mimmo Sarchiapone and introduced by Daniela D'Alimonte, Nicola Mattoscio and Raffaello Tontodonati. Published by Fondazione PescarAbruzzo, printed by Ediz. Menabò (Ortona) (2019)

== Publications about Giuseppe Tontodonati ==
- " Rivista La Regione" November 1989 – all the magazine dedicated to Giuseppe Tontodonati. Articles by Vittoriano Esposito, Pietro Civitareale, Francesco Desiderio, Ottaviano Giannangeli, Giuseppe Rosato, Antonio Saia, Italo Ghignone, Otello (Mario) Martinelli, Sergio Masciarelli, Gilda Tontodonati, Pietro Boccabella
- "Terra Lundane – rileggendo il Canzoniere di Giuseppe Tontodonati" by Martina D'Ambrosio (2018) a review of al the Tontodonati works proposed by the University o Teramo-UNITE in the occasion of the centenary of Tontodonati birth. Introduction by Francesco Avolio, Giovanni Agresti, Antonio Saia and Raffaello Tontodonati – printed by Carsa (Pescara)
