= Saupsdorf =

Village in Saxony, Germany

Coordinates: 50.9406°N 14.3311°E

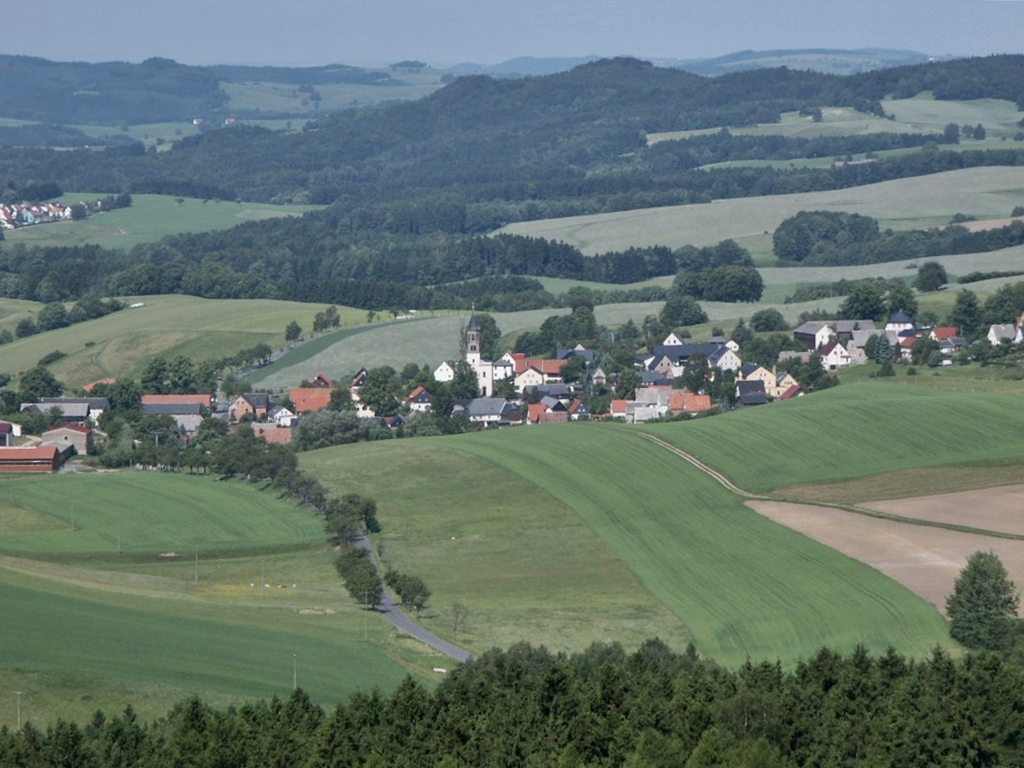
Panorama of Saupsdorf, a small village in the Saxon Switzerland

Saupsdorf is a village in Saxony, Germany, situated in the district of Sächsische Schweiz-Osterzgebirge. It was one of the villages that composed the municipality of Kirnitzschtal. Since 1 October 2012, it has been part of the municipality of Sebnitz.
