= Ulbersdorf station =

Railway stop in Hohnstein, Germany

Ulbersdorf
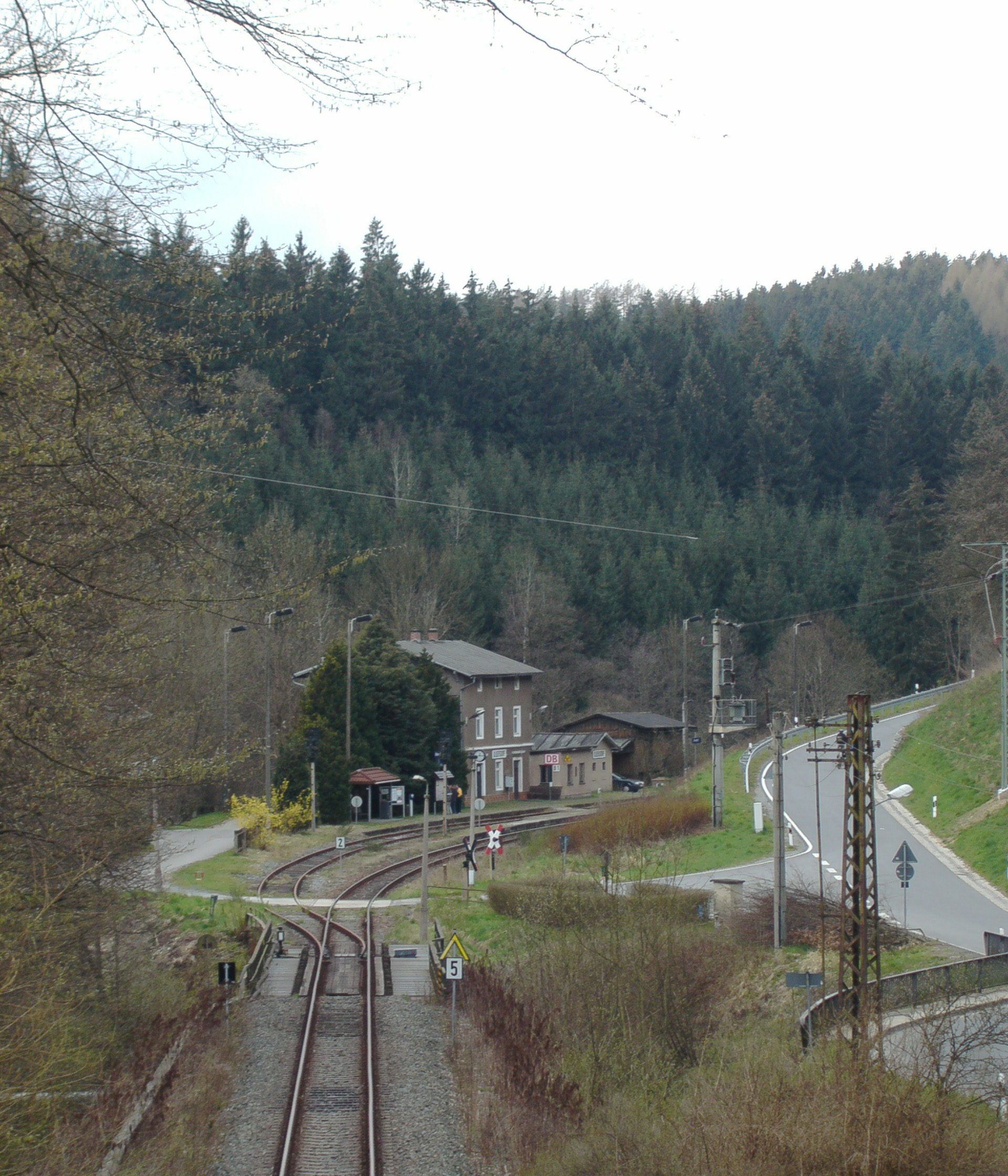
- Ulbersdorf railway station

General information
- Location: Ulbersdorf, Saxony, Germany
- Coordinates: 50°57′20″N 14°13′10″E
- Line: Bautzen–Bad Schandau railway
- Platforms: 2
- Tracks: 2

Services
Preceding station	DB Regio Südost	Following station
Mittelndorf towards Děčín main	U 28	Amtshainersdorf towards Rumburk
Location
- Location within Saxony

Ulbersdorf (German: Bahnhof Ulbersdorf) is a railway station in the village of Ulbersdorf, Saxony, Germany. The station lies on the Bautzen–Bad Schandau railway. The station is served by one train service, operated by DB Regio in cooperation with České dráhy: the National Park Railway. This service connects Děčín and Rumburk via Bad Schandau and Sebnitz.
