= Altendorf (Sebnitz) =

Village in Saxony, Germany

Coordinates: 50.935527°N 14.181891°E

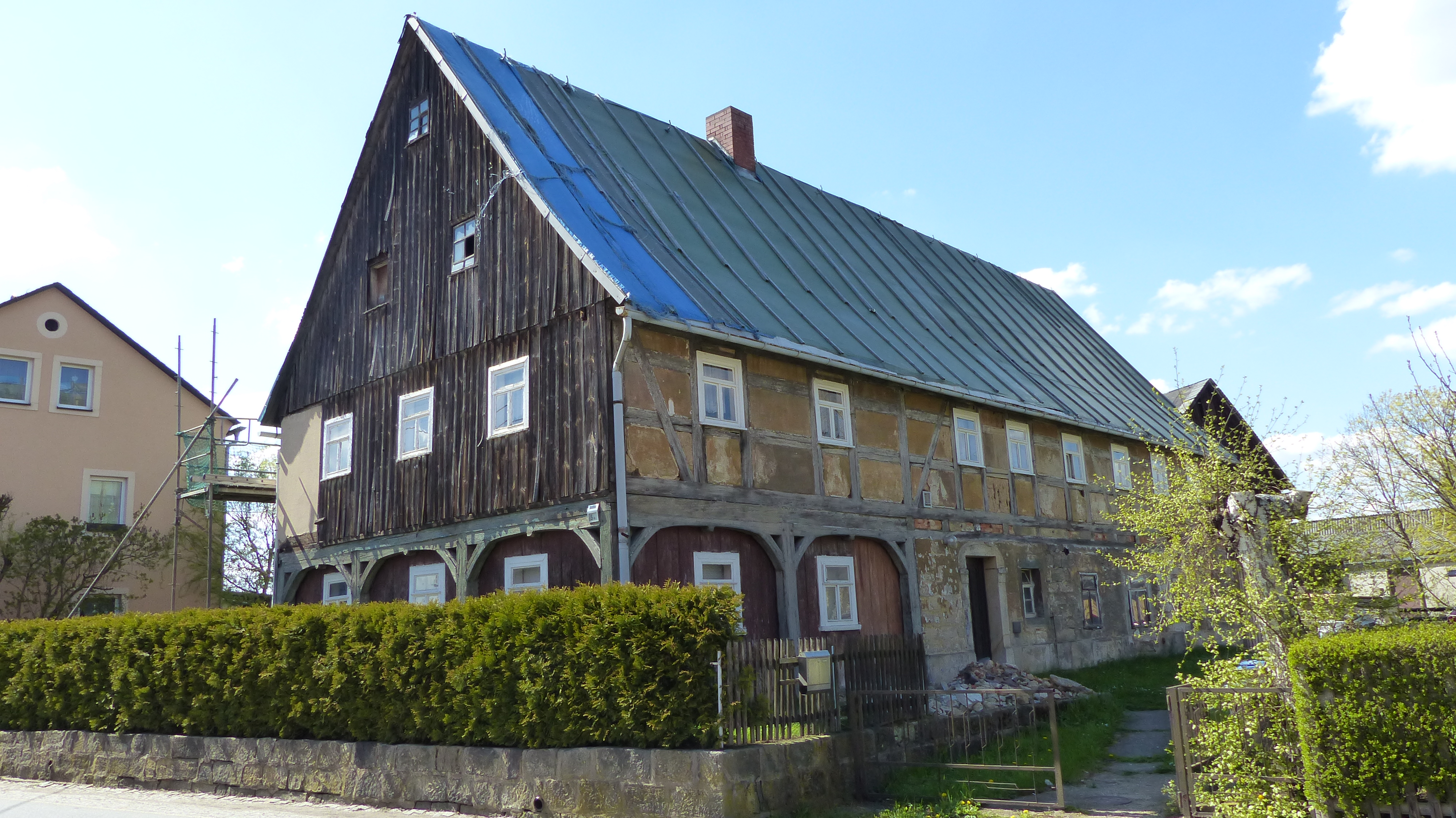
Listed building, Sebnitzer Straße 5a, Altendorf (Sebnitz)

Altendorf (German pronunciation: [ˈaltn̩ˌdɔʁf], lit. 'old village') is a village in Saxony, Germany, situated in the district of Sächsische Schweiz-Osterzgebirge. It lies on the S154 road that links Bad Schandau and Sebnitz. It was one of the villages that composed the municipality of Kirnitzschtal, but, since 1 October 2012, it has been part of the municipality of Sebnitz.
