= Lichtenhain Waterfall =

Coordinates: 50°55′45″N 14°14′36″E

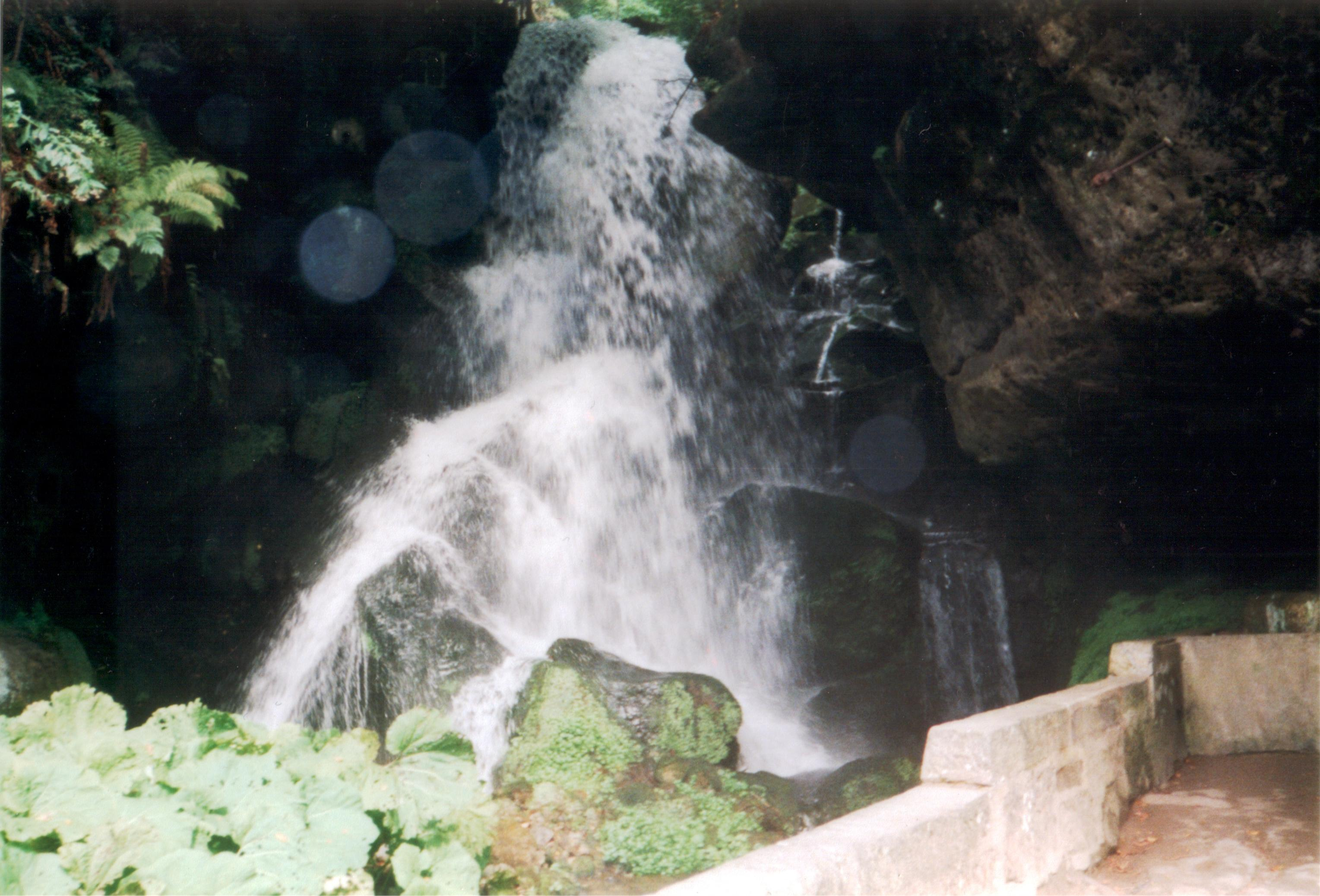
The Lichtenhain Waterfall

The Lichtenhain Waterfall is a waterfall formed by the Lichtenhainer village brook in the Kirnitzsch Valley in the Saxon Switzerland area of Germany. The village of Lichtenhain lies to the north of the waterfall, and is 2.5 kilometres (1.6 mi) away on foot, but some 20 kilometres (12 mi) away by road.

William Lebrecht Götzinger, chronicler of Saxon Switzerland, mentioned the waterfall in his 1812 work Schandau and its environments.

The original waterfall was deemed insufficiently impressive for tourists, so the brook was dammed by an artificial weir. Since the Kirnitzschtalbahn, a tramway linking the waterfall with Bad Schandau, was opened in 1898, hundreds of thousands of tourists have visited the waterfall.

== See also ==
- Sebnitz
- Mittelndorf
- Bad Schandau Elevator
