= Stalag IV-A =

WWII prisoner-of-war camp

- Elsterhorst, Saxony
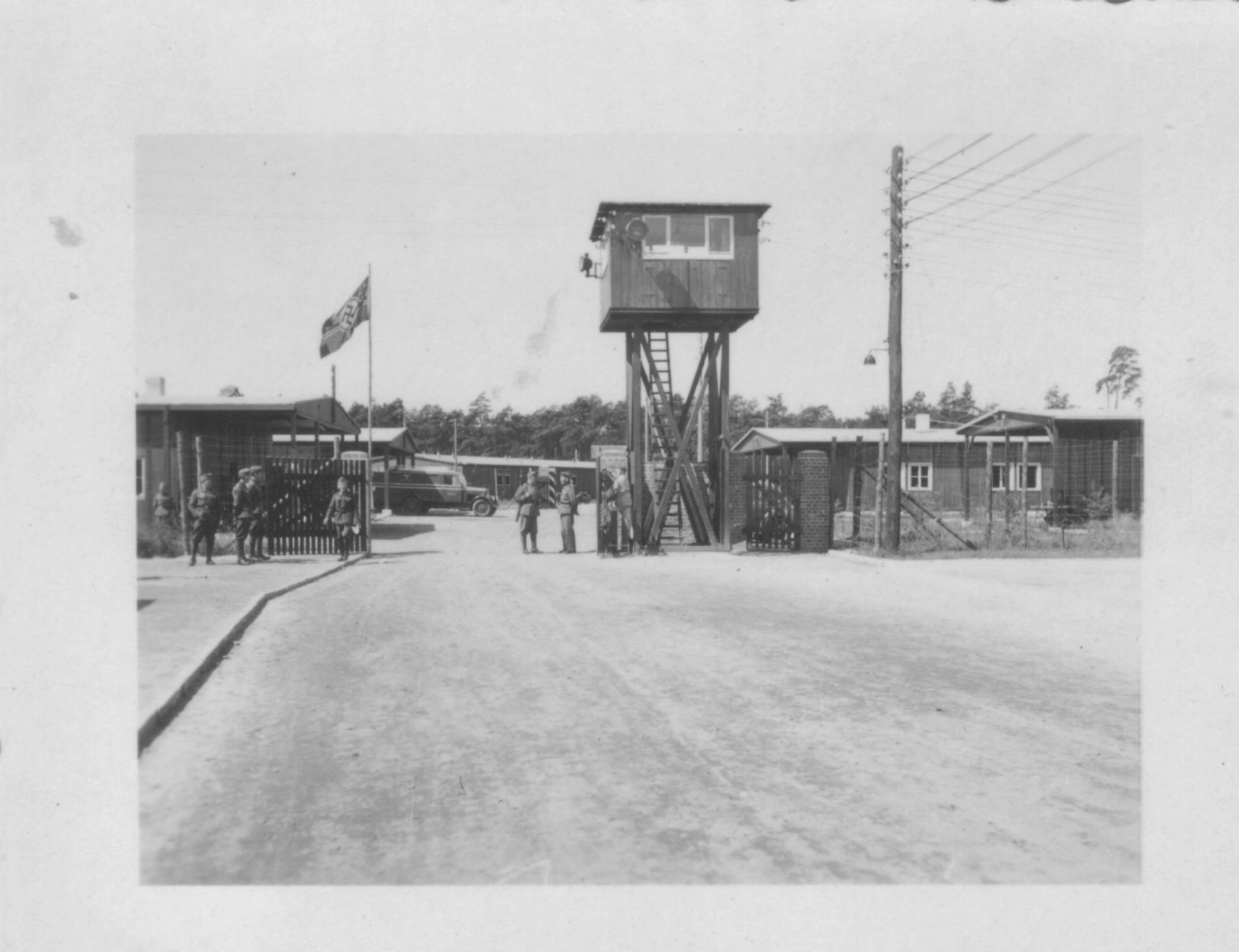
- Main entrance in 1940

Site information
- Type: Prisoner-of-war camp
- Controlled by: Nazi Germany

Location
- Elsterhorst, Germany (pre-war borders, 1937)
- Location within Germany
- Coordinates: 51.4519°N 14.1996°E

Site history
- In use: 1938–1945
- Battles/wars: World War II

Garrison information
- Occupants: Polish, French, Belgian, British, Serbian, Soviet, Dutch, Italian, American, Slovak, Czech, Bulgarian and other Allied POWs

Stalag IV-A Elsterhorst was a World War II German Army prisoner-of-war camp located south of the village of Elsterhorst (now Nardt), near Hoyerswerda in Saxony, 44 kilometres (27 mi) north-east of Dresden (this should not however be confused with Stalag IV-A Hohnstein, which was located 20 miles ENE of Dresden). It held Polish, French, Belgian, British, Serbian, Soviet, Dutch, Italian, American, Slovak, Czech, Bulgarian and other Allied POWs.

== Camp history ==
The camp opened in 1938, and the first occupants were 350 prisoners from Czechoslovakia, who were accommodated in tents. In 1939, prisoners from the German invasion of Poland arrived and were put to work building 40 barrack huts. Originally Stalag IV, the camp was re-designated Stalag IV-A in October 1940. In June 1940, part of the camp was re-designated Oflag IV-D, as a camp for officers, predominantly French, but also Belgian, British, Canadian and Yugoslav. Another part of the camp was set aside as a hospital for prisoners as Reserve Lazarett 742. From 1941, the stalag received POWs from Russia, who were housed in a separate compound.

Most POWs were sent to forced labour subcamps throughout the region, and several hundred were in Dresden during the bombing of Dresden.

After the bombing of Dresden in February 1945, conditions for American and British prisoners worsened considerably. They were particularly affected by the withholding of their Red Cross parcels, leading to general malnourishment and consequently a number of deaths from pneumonia.

=== Liberation and after ===
As the Red Army advanced, the camp received more Belgian and French POWs from camps further east. In February 1945, officer prisoners were marched westwards. The camp was finally liberated by the Russians in April 1945.

While under Russian control, the camp was used to hold up to 70,000 captured German troops. In October 1945, the camp was returned to German administration and was used as a transit and quarantine camp for troops returning home. From 1946, the camp was used as a resettlement camp for refugees from territories now in Poland, until finally closed on 31 March 1948. In 1957, the site of the camp was redeveloped as Nardt airfield.

=== Deaths ===
Prisoners who died at the camp were interred at the cemetery in Nardt. The remains of French, British and Canadian POWs were exhumed and returned to their homelands in 1952. The Russians were re-interred at a memorial grove in Hoyerswerda in 1974.

== See also ==
- List of German World War II POW camps
- English blog about English/American POWs at Stalag IV-A
- French blog about French/Belgian POWs at Stalag IV-A
