= Italian Military Internees =

Italian soldiers captured in Nazi Germany

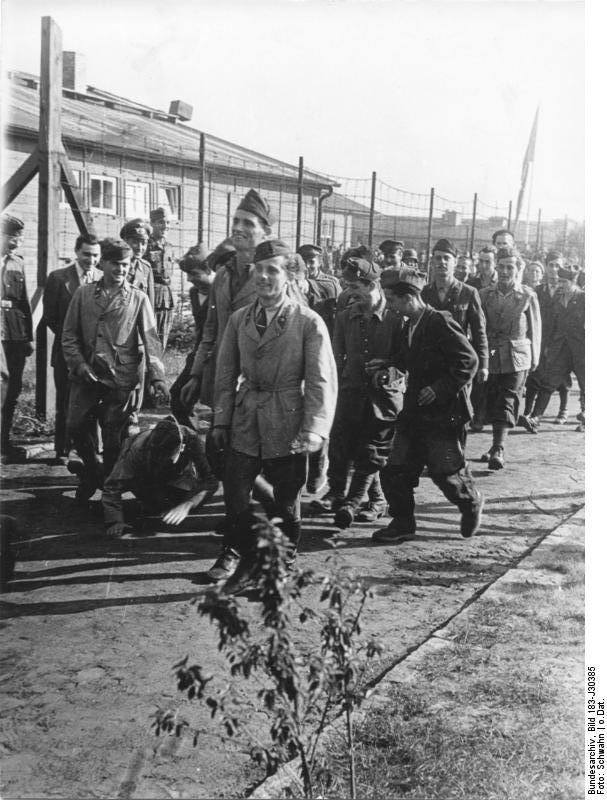
Prison camp for Italian military after the armistice of 8 September 1943, German propaganda photo

"Italian Military Internees" (German: Italienische Militärinternierte, Italian: Internati Militari Italiani, abbreviated as IMI) was the official name given by Germany to the Italian soldiers captured, rounded up and deported in the territories of Nazi Germany and German-occupied Europe in Operation Achse in the days immediately following the World War II armistice between Italy and Allied armed forces (8 September 1943).

After disarmament by the Germans, the Italian soldiers and officers were confronted with the choice to continue fighting as allies of the German army (either in the armed forces of the Italian Social Republic, the German puppet regime in northern Italy led by Mussolini, or in Italian "volunteer" units in the German armed forces) or, otherwise, be sent to detention camps in Germany. Those soldiers and officials who refused to recognize the "republic" led by Mussolini were taken as civilian prisoners too. Only 10 percent agreed to enroll. The others were considered prisoners of war. Later they were re-designated "military internees" by the Germans (so as to not recognize the rights granted prisoners of war by the Third Geneva Convention), and finally, in the autumn of 1944 until the end of the war, "civilian workers", so they could be subjected to hard labor without protection of the Red Cross.

The Nazis considered the Italians traitors, not prisoners of war. The former Italian soldiers were sent into forced labor in war industries (35.6%), heavy industry (7.1%), mining (28.5%), construction (5.9%) and agriculture (14.3%). The working conditions were very poor. The Italians were inadequately fed or clothed for the winter in Germany, Poland, etc. Many became sick and died.

There were cases of harassment and beatings of Italians who refused to fight on the side of Germany. Some Italians were sent not to POW camps, but to Nazi concentration camps, including Flossenbürg, Gross-Rosen, Mittelbau-Dora, and their subcamps.

Italians were also victims of mass executions and massacres by the Germans.

The death rate of the military internees at 6-7% was second only to that of Soviet prisoners of war, albeit much lower.

== Numbers of prisoners and casualties ==
The Germans disarmed and captured 1,007,000 Italian soldiers, out of a total of approximately 2,000,000 actually in the army. Of these, 196,000 fled during the deportation. Of the remaining approximately 810,000 (of which 58,000 were caught in France, 321,000 in Italy and 430,000 in the Balkans), more than 13,000 lost their lives during the transportation from the Greek islands to the mainland and 94,000, including almost all the Blackshirts of the MVSN, decided immediately to accept the offer to fight alongside the Germans. This left a total of approximately 710,000. Italian soldiers deported into German prison camps with the status of IMI. By the spring of 1944, some 103,000 had declared themselves ready to serve in Germany or the Italian Social Republic, as combatants or as auxiliary workers. In total, therefore, between 600,000 and 650,000 soldiers refused to continue the war alongside the Germans.

The estimates of losses among the IMI vary between 37,000 and 50,000.
The most common estimate is 45,000 victims. The causes of death were:

- the harshness and danger of forced labor (10,000 dead)
- disease and malnutrition, especially in the last months of the war (23,000)
- executions inside the camps (4,600)
- the allied bombings of facilities where they worked (2,700)
- others perished on the Eastern Front (5,000-7,000)
- attempted to escape to allied lines in Italy or the Western Front or neutral Switzerland and were either shot or died on to journey to freedom (Unknown Number)

At the end of the war, several thousand former IMI ended up in the hands of French, Soviets or Yugoslavs, and instead of being released, were kept in captivity for some time after the end of the war while others were liberated by American, British and Canadian soldiers.

Some of the Italians died in the weeks or months after their liberation and return to Italy, after exhausting labor in German labor camps like those in Kamienna Góra.

== Places of internment ==
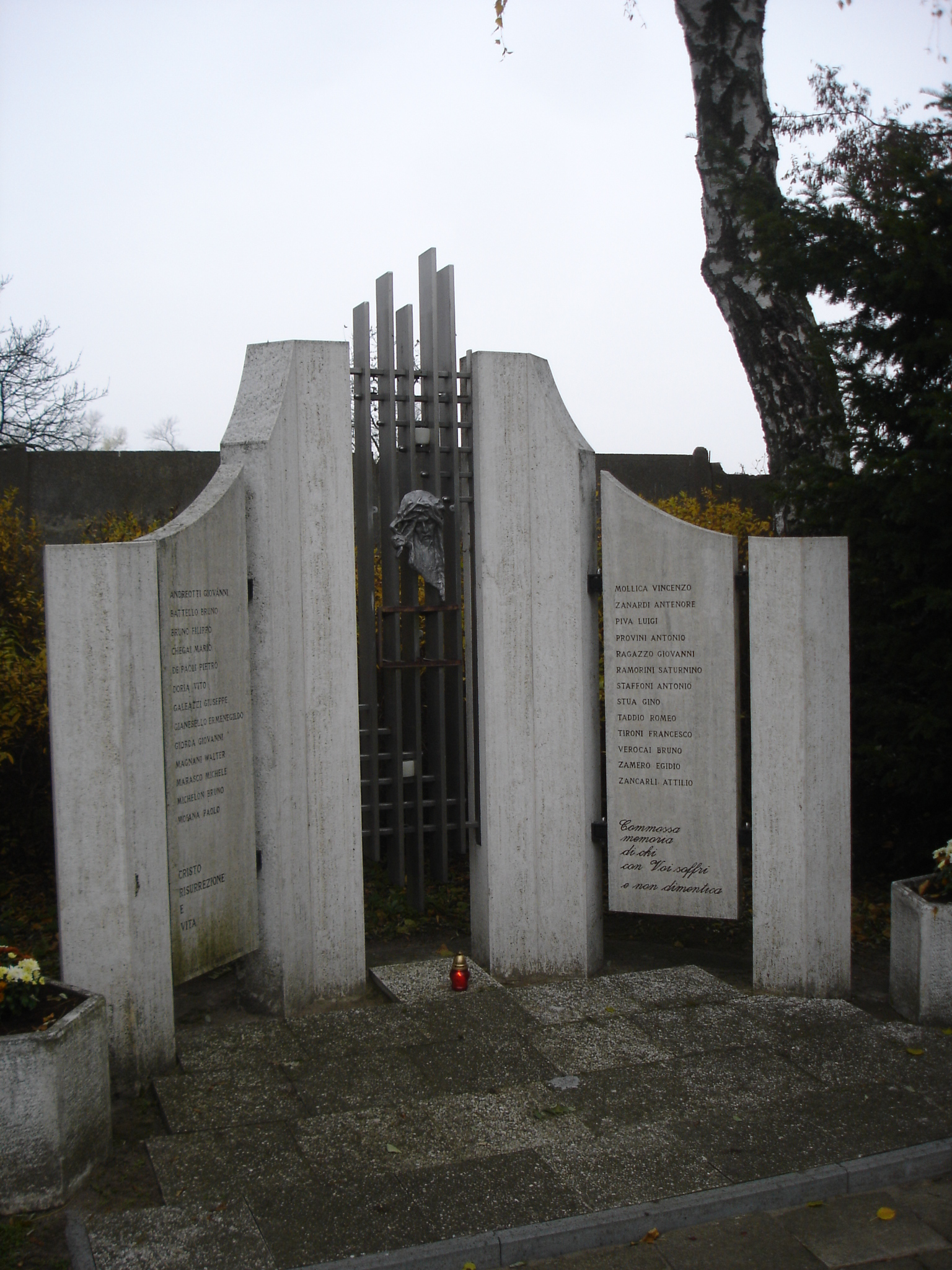
Memorial to Italian POWs who died in the Stalag II-D camp, Stargard, Poland

Prisoner-of-war camps in which sizeable numbers of Italians were held:

- Stalag I-A with 11,323 Italian POWs as of 1 October 1943
- Stalag I-B with 12,697 Italian POWs as of 1 October 1943
- Stalag I-F with 19,957 Italian POWs as of 1 October 1943
- Stalag II-B with 12,904 Italian POWs as of 1 October 1942
- Stalag II-D with 6,409 Italian POWs as of October 1943
- Stalag III-A with some 16,000 Italian POWs
- Stalag III-B (Fürstenberg/Oder) with some 13,500 Italian POWs brought by October 1943
- Stalag III-C with 1,449 Italian POWs as of 1 October 1944
- Stalag III-D with 31,738 Italian POWs registered by January 1944
- Stalag VI-C with over 11,000 Italian POWs as of 1 October 1943
- Stalag VI-D (Dortmund) with 4,473 Italian POWs as of 1 October 1944
- Stalag VIII-A with 9,415 Italian POWs as of 1 June 1944
- Stalag VIII-C with 5,251 Italian POWs as of 1 December 1943
- Stalag IX-C with 9,225 Italian POWs as of 1 December 1943
- Stalag XI-B with 13,561 Italian POWs by October 1943
- Stalag XIII-B (Weiden) with 4,787 Italian POWs as of 1 April 1944
- Stalag XIII-D with 10,139 Italian POWs as of 1 April 1944
- Stalag XX-B with 6,081 Italian POWs as of 1 July 1944
- Stalag 307 with 7,765 Italian POWs as of January 1944
- Stalag 319 (Chełm) with 2,163 Italian POWs as of January 1944
- Stalag 327 (Przemyśl) with 3,555 Italian POWs as of 1 January 1944
- Stalag 328 (Lwów) with 2,441 Italian POWs as of January 1944
- Stalag 333 (Beniaminów) with 2,720 Italian POWs as of 1 January 1944
- Stalag 344 with 1,063 Italian POWs as of 3 January 1944
- Stalag 352 (Minsk) with 3,500 Italian POWs between December 1943 and June 1944
- Oflag 73 (Beniaminów) with 2,934 Italian POWs as of 1 February 1944
- Oflag 83 (Wietzendorf) with some 6,000 Italian POWs in the spring of 1945

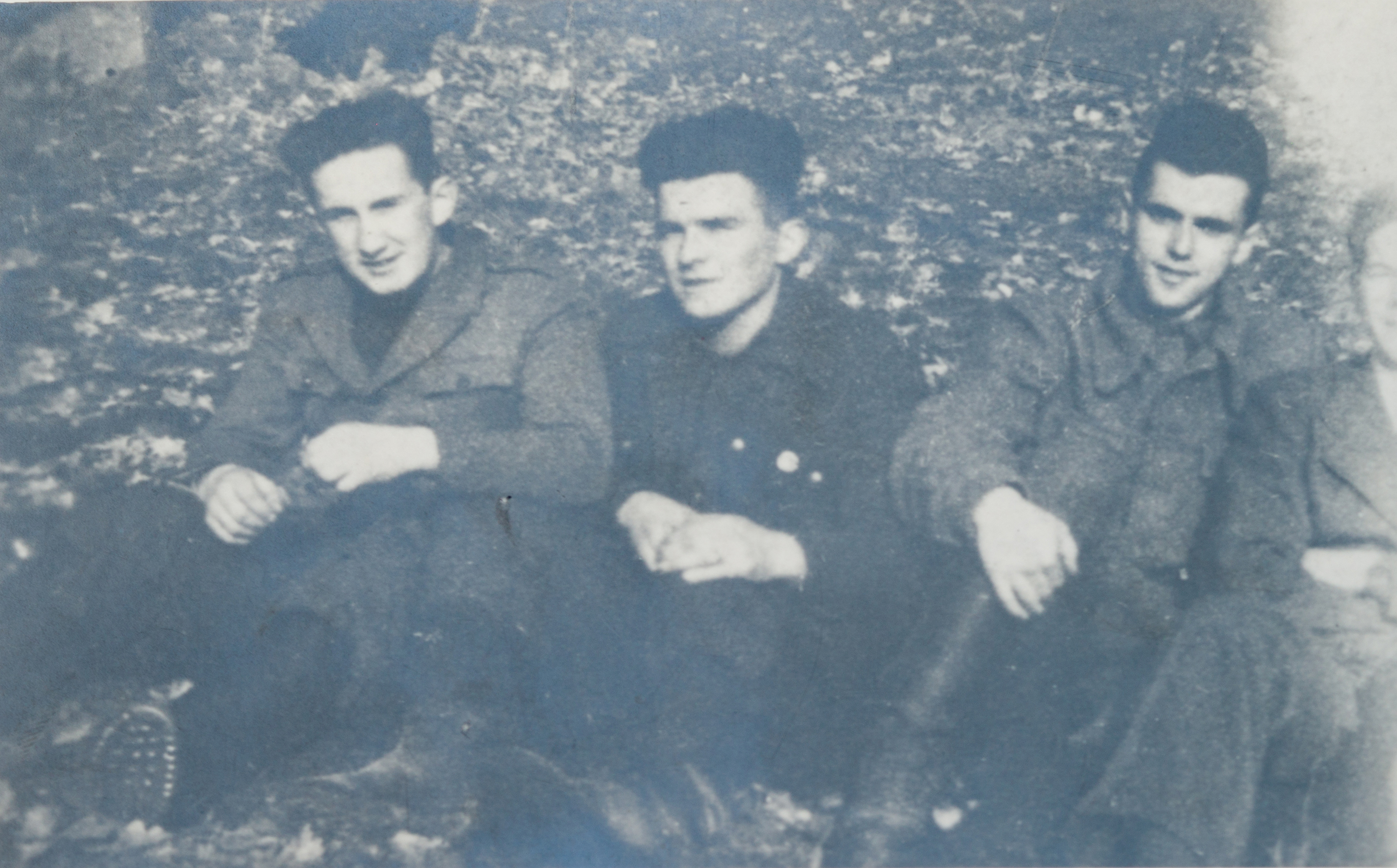
Italian prisoners in Stalag XVIII-A in Wolfsberg

Other places of internment were Stalag II-A, Stalag IV-A, Stalag IV-B, Stalag IV-C, Stalag IV-D, Stalag IV-F, Stalag IV-G, Stalag V-A, Stalag V-B (Villingen), Stalag V-C (Offenburg), Stalag VI-A, Stalag VI-F (Bocholt), Stalag VI-G (Bonn–Duisdorf), Stalag VI-J (Krefeld-Fichtenhain), Stalag VII-A, Stalag VII-B (Memmingen), Stalag VIII-B, Stalag IX-A (Ziegenhain), Stalag IX-B, Stalag X-A (Schleswig), Stalag X-B, Stalag X-C, Stalag XII-A (Limburg an der Lahn), Stalag XII-D (Trier), Stalag XII-F (Forbach), Stalag XIII-A (Sulzbach-Rosenberg), Stalag XIII-C, Stalag XVII-A (Kaisersteinbruch), Stalag XVII-B (Gneixendorf), Stalag XVIII-A, Stalag XVIII-C (Markt Pongau), Stalag XX-A, Stalag XXI-D, Stalag 122 (Compiègne), Stalag 365 (Novara), Stalag 366 (Siedlce), Stalag 367 (Częstochowa), Stalag 373 (Prostki), Stalag 384, Stalag 398 (near Pupping), Oflag IV-B, Oflag VIII-F, Oflag X-B, Oflag XVIII-A (Lienz), Oflag XXI-C/Z (Gronówko), Oflag 64/Z (Skoki).

== Atrocities against Italian POWs ==
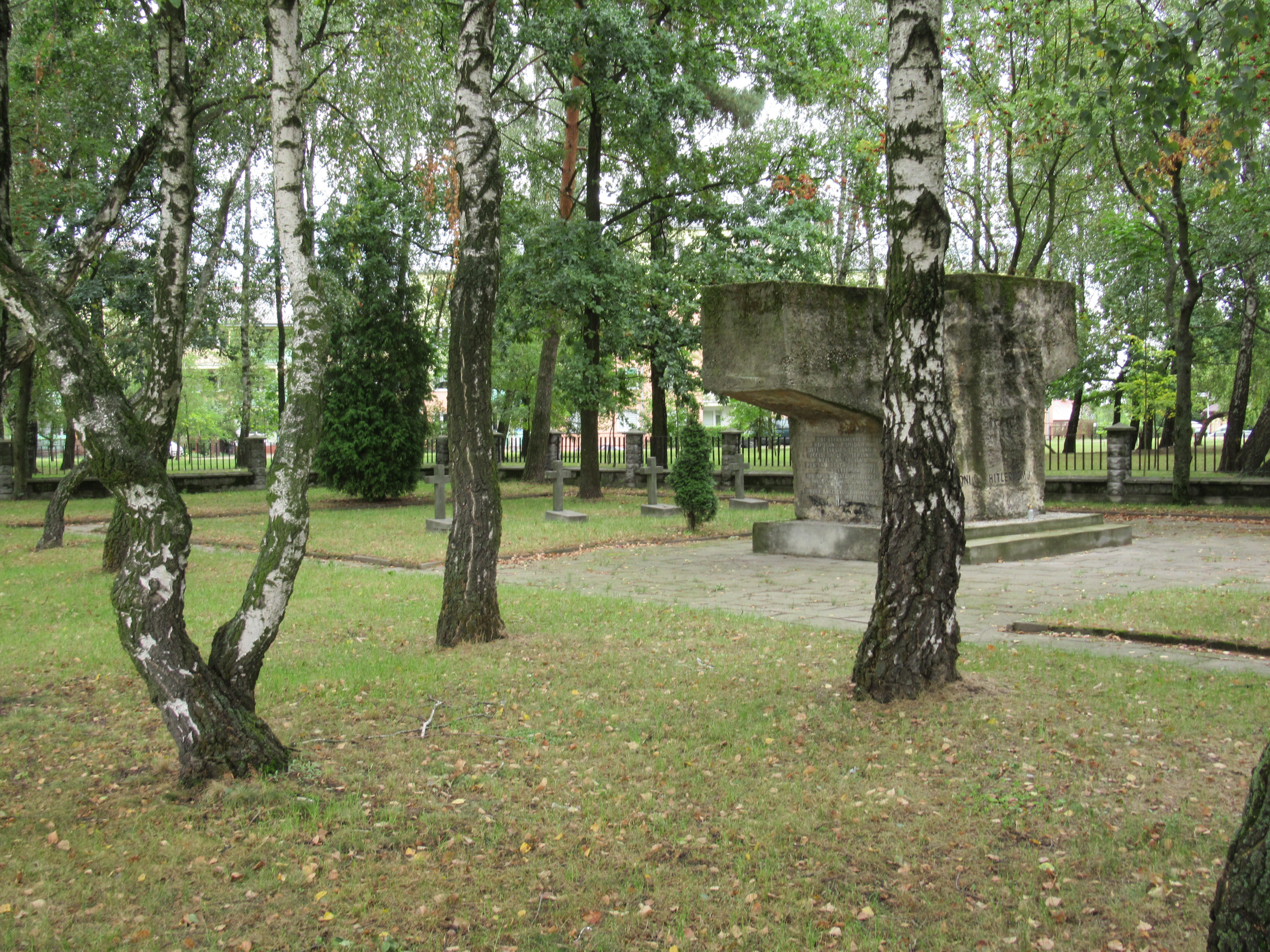
Cemetery of 406 Italian prisoners killed by the Germans in 1943–1944, Biała Podlaska, Poland

In addition to the mass deaths caused by starvation and epidemics, the Germans also carried out mass executions of Italian prisoners in several locations, including the Stalag 319 camp in Chełm with several hundred victims and the Stalag 327 camp in Przemyśl, both in German-occupied Poland.

There were cases of Italian prisoners being shot for taking food smuggled in by Polish civilians or even for eating grass, as in the Stalag 366/Z camp in Biała Podlaska in German-occupied Poland.

German troops also committed massacres of Italian prisoners either shortly before or during their retreat westward from occupied Poland, as in Międzyrzec Podlaski, where 60 Italian prisoners of a local forced labour subcamp of the Stalag 366 camp were massacred on 23 July 1944, and Kuźnica Żelichowska where six Italian generals (Giuseppe Andreoli, Emanuele Balbo Bertone, Ugo Ferrero, Carlo Spatocco, Alberto Trionfi, Alessandro Vaccaneo) were massacred on 28 January 1945 during a German-perpetrated death march.

In 2023, previously unknown graves of 60 Italian prisoners of war who had been buried by the Germans in cramped crates without lids were discovered at a POW cemetery in Łambinowice, Poland.

== Ships sunk carrying Italian POWs ==
- Gaetano Donizetti, 23 September 1943, Rhodes, 1,796 killed, sunk by HMS Eclipse
- Ardena, 27 September 1943, Argostoli, 779 killed, sunk by a mine
- Mario Roselli, 11 October 1943, Corfu, 1,302 killed, sunk by RAF air attack
- Maria Amalia, 13 October 1943, Kefalonia, 544 killed, sunk by a mine or by a Royal Navy submarine (either HMS Unruly or HMS Trooper)
- Sinfra, 20 October 1943, Crete, 2,098 killed, sunk by RAF and USAAF air attacks
- Aghios Antonios - Kal 89, 19 November 1943, Karpathos, 110 killed, sunk by ORP Sokół
- Leda, 2 February 1944, Amorgos, 780 killed, sunk by RAF air attack
- Petrella, 8 February 1944, Souda, 2,670 killed, sunk by HMS Sportsman
- Oria, 12 February 1944, Cape Sounion, 4,074 killed, shipwrecked in a storm
- Sifnos, 4 March 1944, Milos, 70 killed, sunk by RAF air attack
- Tanais, 9 June 1944, Crete, 213 killed, sunk by HMS Vivid

Total of 13,939 killed

== Notable IMIs ==
- Vittorio Emanuele Giuntella
- Giovannino Guareschi
- Tonino Guerra
- Alex Moroder
- Alessandro Natta
- Luciano Salce
- Mario Rigoni Stern
- Gianrico Tedeschi
- Giuseppe Tontodonati

== See also ==
- Disarmed Enemy Forces
- Italian prisoners of war in the Soviet Union
- Italian Service Units
- La Voce della Patria

== Bibliography ==
- Marcinkiewicz, Stefan Michał (2024). "Stalag I B Kommando Prostken (I B/PR). Włoscy żołnierze w obozie jenieckim w Boguszach/Prostkach (1943-1945)". Przegląd Historyczno-Wojskowy (in Polish). Vol. 25, no. 3.
- Megargee, Geoffrey P.; Overmans, Rüdiger; Vogt, Wolfgang (2022). The United States Holocaust Memorial Museum Encyclopedia of Camps and Ghettos 1933–1945. Volume IV. Indiana University Press, United States Holocaust Memorial Museum. ISBN 978-0-253-06089-1.
- Sula, Dorota (2010). "Jeńcy włoscy na Dolnym Śląsku w czasie II wojny światowej" (PDF). Łambinowicki rocznik muzealny (in Polish). 33. Opole.
