= Lichtenhain (Sebnitz) =

Coordinates: 50.944579°N 14.239411°E

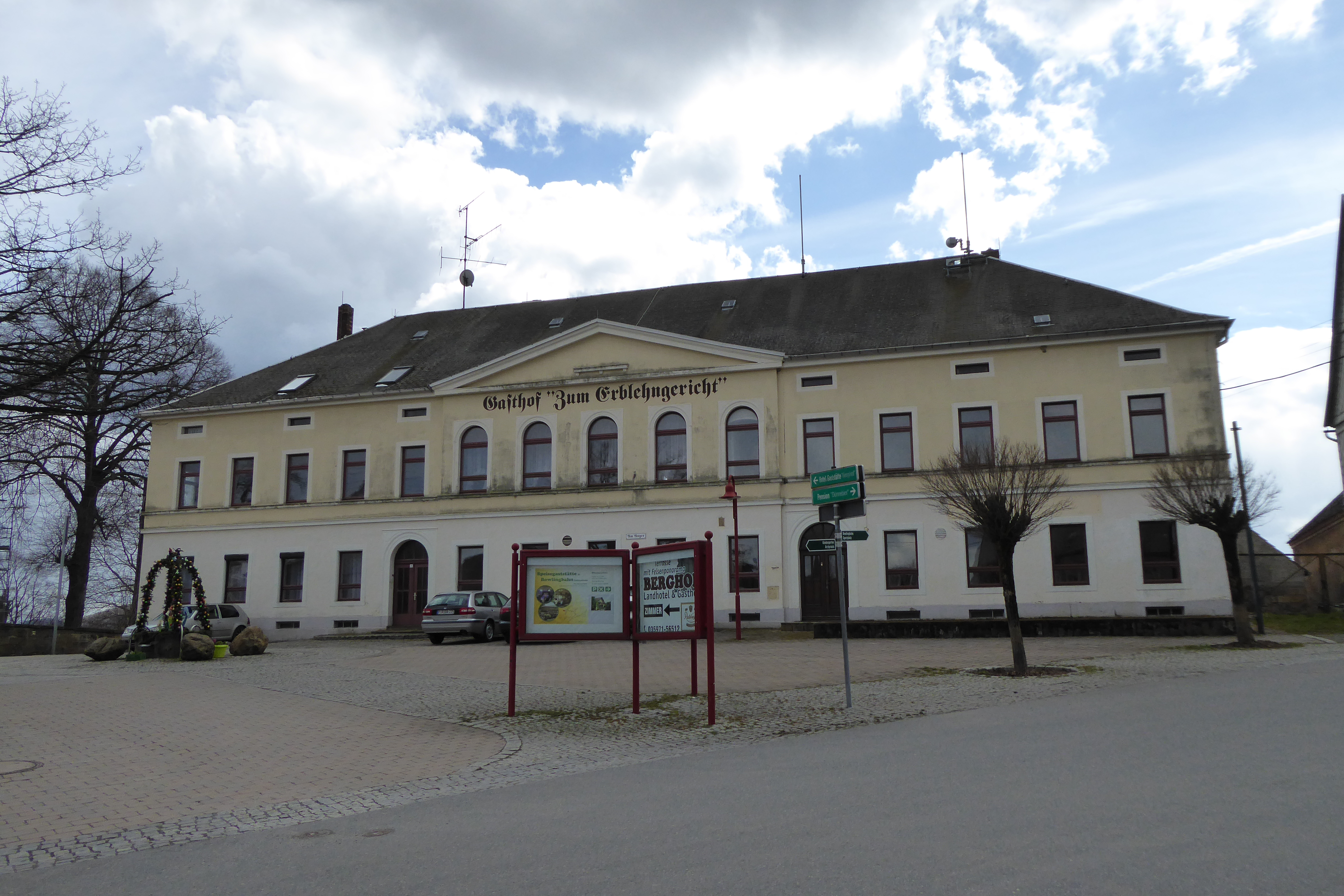
Lichtenhain

Lichtenhain is a village in Saxony, Germany, situated in the district of Sächsische Schweiz-Osterzgebirge. It lies on the S154 road that links Bad Schandau and Sebnitz. It was one of the villages that composed the municipality of Kirnitzschtal, but, since 1 October 2012, it has been part of the municipality of Sebnitz.

The tourist attraction of the Lichtenhain Waterfall lies to the south of the village. It is 2.5 kilometres (1.6 mi) away on foot, but some 20 kilometres (12 mi) away by road, and is best approached by the S165 road from Bad Schandau, or the Kirnitzschtal tramway that parallels it.
