= Sebnitz =

- Town
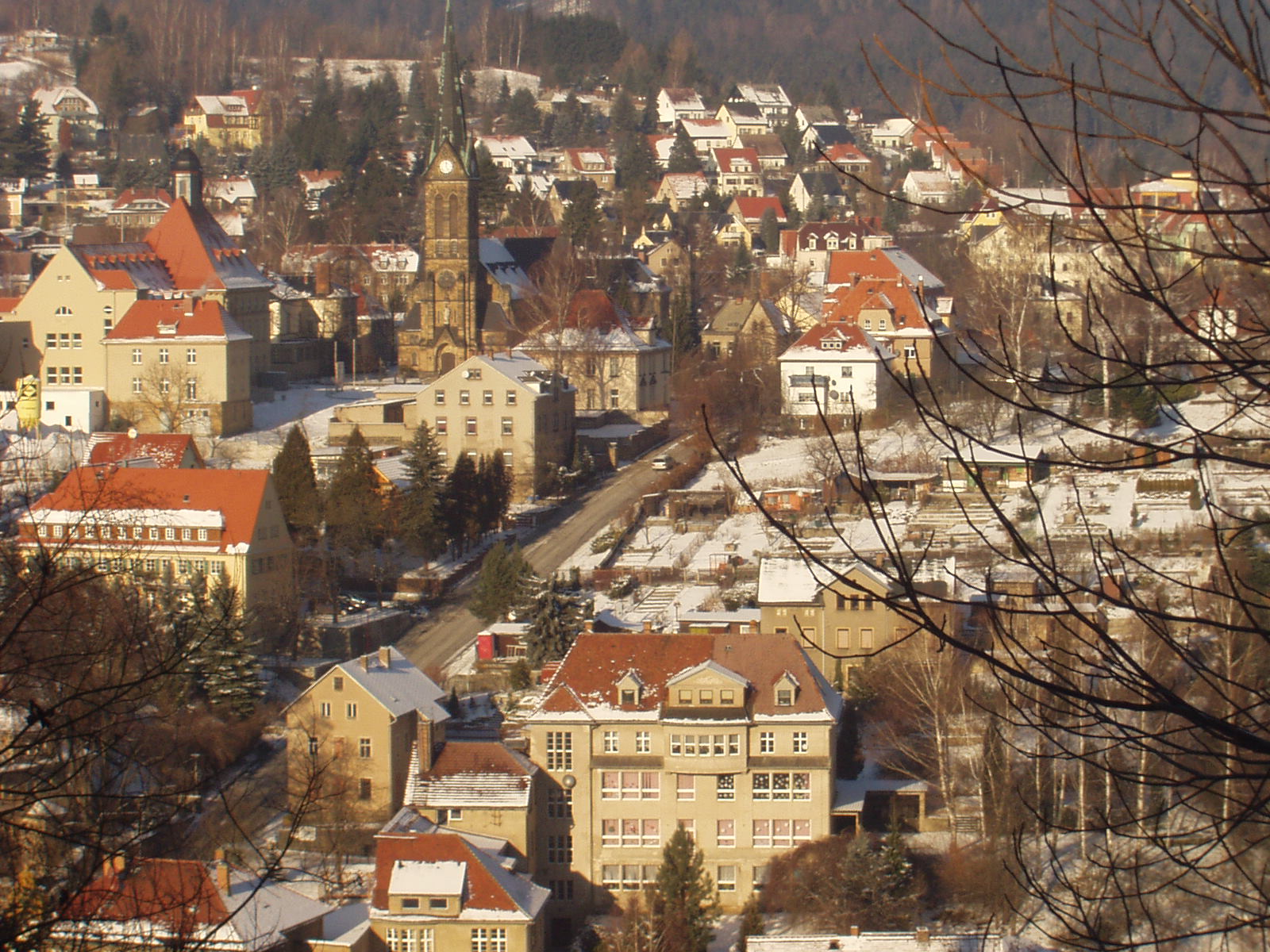
- Sebnitz during winter

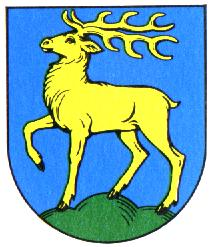
- Coat of arms

- Location of Sebnitz within Sächsische Schweiz-Osterzgebirge district
- Interactive map of Sebnitz
- Location within Germany Location within Saxony
- Coordinates: 50°58′N 14°17′E
- Country: Germany
- State: Saxony
- District: Sächsische Schweiz-Osterzgebirge
- Subdivisions: 5

Government
  - Mayor (2022–29): Ronald Kretzschmar

Area
  - Total: 88.23 km^{2} (34.07 sq mi)
- Elevation: 379 m (1,243 ft)

Population (2025-12-31)
  - Total: 9,356
  - Density: 106.0/km^{2} (274.6/sq mi)
- Time zone: UTC+01:00 (CET)
  - Summer (DST): UTC+02:00 (CEST)
- Postal codes: 01851–01855
- Dialling codes: 035971
- Vehicle registration: PIR, DW, FTL, SEB
- Website: www.sebnitz.de

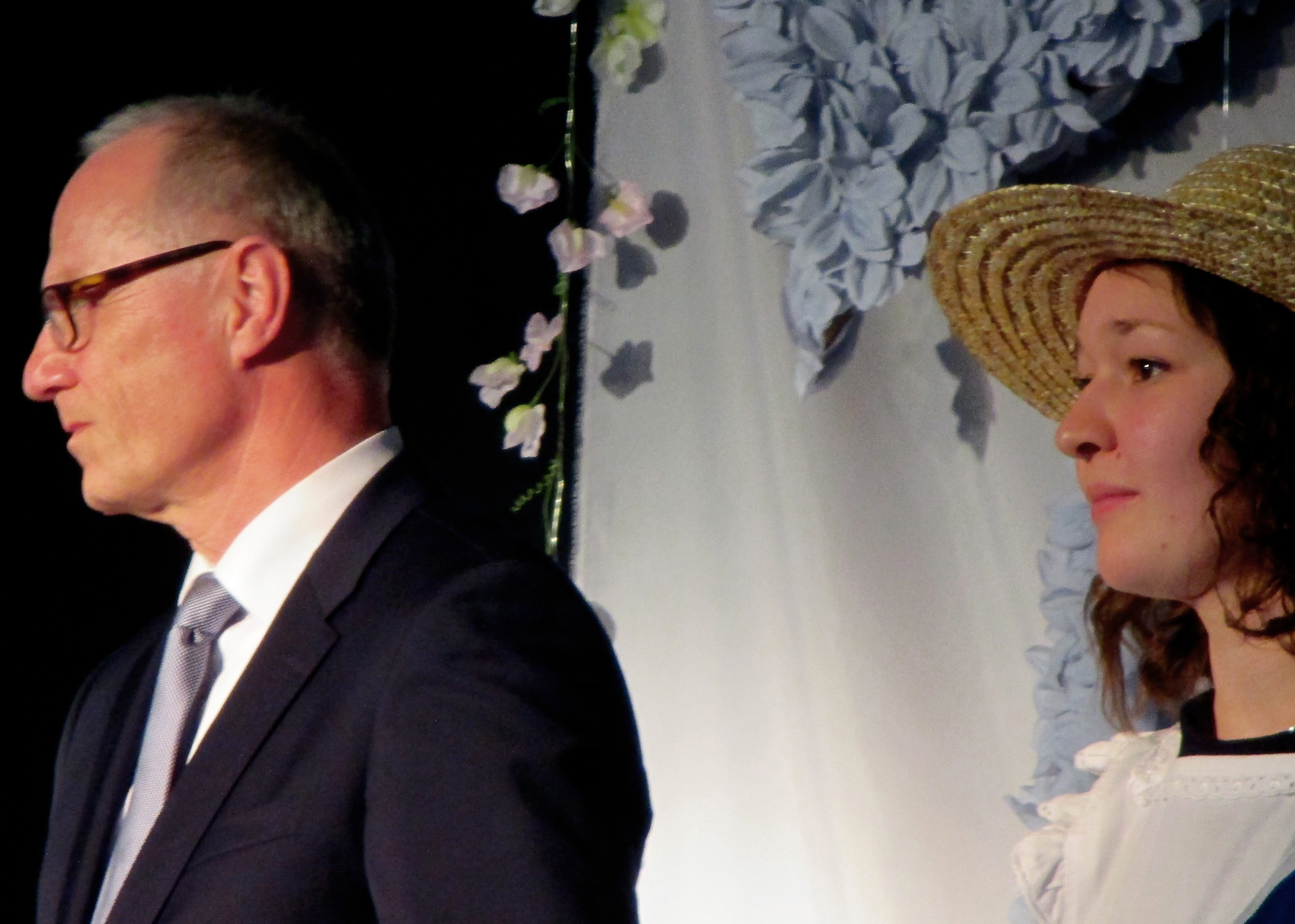
Senior mayor Mike Ruckh Sebnitz with Flower Girl

Sebnitz (German pronunciation: [ˈzeːbnɪts]; Upper Sorbian: Zebnica, pronounced [ˈzɛbnʲitsa]) is a town in the Sächsische Schweiz-Osterzgebirge district, in Saxony, Germany.

== Geography ==
The town of Sebnitz lies in the valley of the river Sebnitz and its side valleys between 251 and 460 m above sea level between the mountains of Saxon Switzerland and the Lusatian Highlands. Topographically the town itself lies in the West Lusatian Upland, but lies right on the border with the Upper Lusatian Highlands. Because the natural region of Saxon Switzerland is also very close by, the countryside around the town is very varied.

The municipality consists of the town Sebnitz itself, Schönbach (joined 1935), Hainersdorf (joined 1920), Hertigswalde (joined 1950), Hinterhermsdorf (joined 1998) and the former municipality of Kirnitzschtal (joined 2012), that itself consisted of the villages Altendorf, Mittelndorf, Lichtenhain, Ottendorf and Saupsdorf.

== History ==
Map of Sebnitz (around 1770)

Sebnitz was first mentioned in a document of 1223/1241 outlining the borders between the kingdom of Bohemia and the diocese of Meißen. In 1451 it was first mentioned as a town. A new town hall was built in 1714–1715, but was destroyed together with numerous other buildings, among them the school house, in a fire in 1854. Around 1900 Sebnitz became a centre of the manufacture of artificial flowers. From 1952 until 1994 the town was the administrative centre of the district Sebnitz.

In 1997, six-year-old German-Iraqi Joseph Kantelberg-Abdulla, who suffered from a heart condition, had a heart attack and drowned in the local public swimming pool. Three months later, his mother claimed that the boy had been tortured and drowned by no less than 50 neo-Nazis, wearing boots, tattoos, and all. While Der Spiegel did not buy the story, tabloid Bild took full advantage, dragging the town into the national spotlight for about a week until the mother was investigated by police for encouraging false accusations.

Sebnitz hosted the Festival "Tag der Sachsen" in 2003. In October 2015 around 3000 people protested against the migration policy of the German Chancellor Angela Merkel and built a symbolic 'living frontier' (lebende Grenze) against asylum seekers.

== Transport ==
Sebnitz railway station is located at Rumburk–Sebnitz railway, which connects here to Bautzen–Bad Schandau railway. Train services are operated by Städtebahn Sachsen (Pirna–Neustadt–Sebnitz) and DB Regio (in cooperation with České dráhy) (Rumburk–Dolní Poustevna–Sebnitz–Bad Schandau–Děčín hl.n.), mostly every two hours. The Kirnitzschtalbahn, a rural tramway, serves the Lichtenhain Waterfall from Bad Schandau. The nearest airport is Dresden Airport, which is located 64 km (40 mi) north west of Sebnitz.

== See also ==
- Angel Church, Hinterhermsdorf
