= Oberottendorf station =

Railway station in Neustadt in Sachsen, Germany

Oberottendorf

General information
- Location: Oberottendorf, Saxony, Germany
- Coordinates: 51°03′52″N 14°12′03″E
- Line: Bautzen–Bad Schandau railway
- Platforms: 1
- Tracks: 3

History
- Opened: 1877
- Closed: 11 December 2004
Location
- Location within Saxony

Oberottendorf (German: Bahnhof Oberottendorf) is a former railway station in the village of Oberottendorf, Saxony, Germany. The station lies on the Bautzen–Bad Schandau railway. It closed in December 2004 when direct passenger service between Neutstadt and Bautzen ended. The line itself was severed by the building of a road bypass north of Neustadt.
