= Krumhermsdorf station =

Railway station in Saxony, Germany

Krumhermsdorf
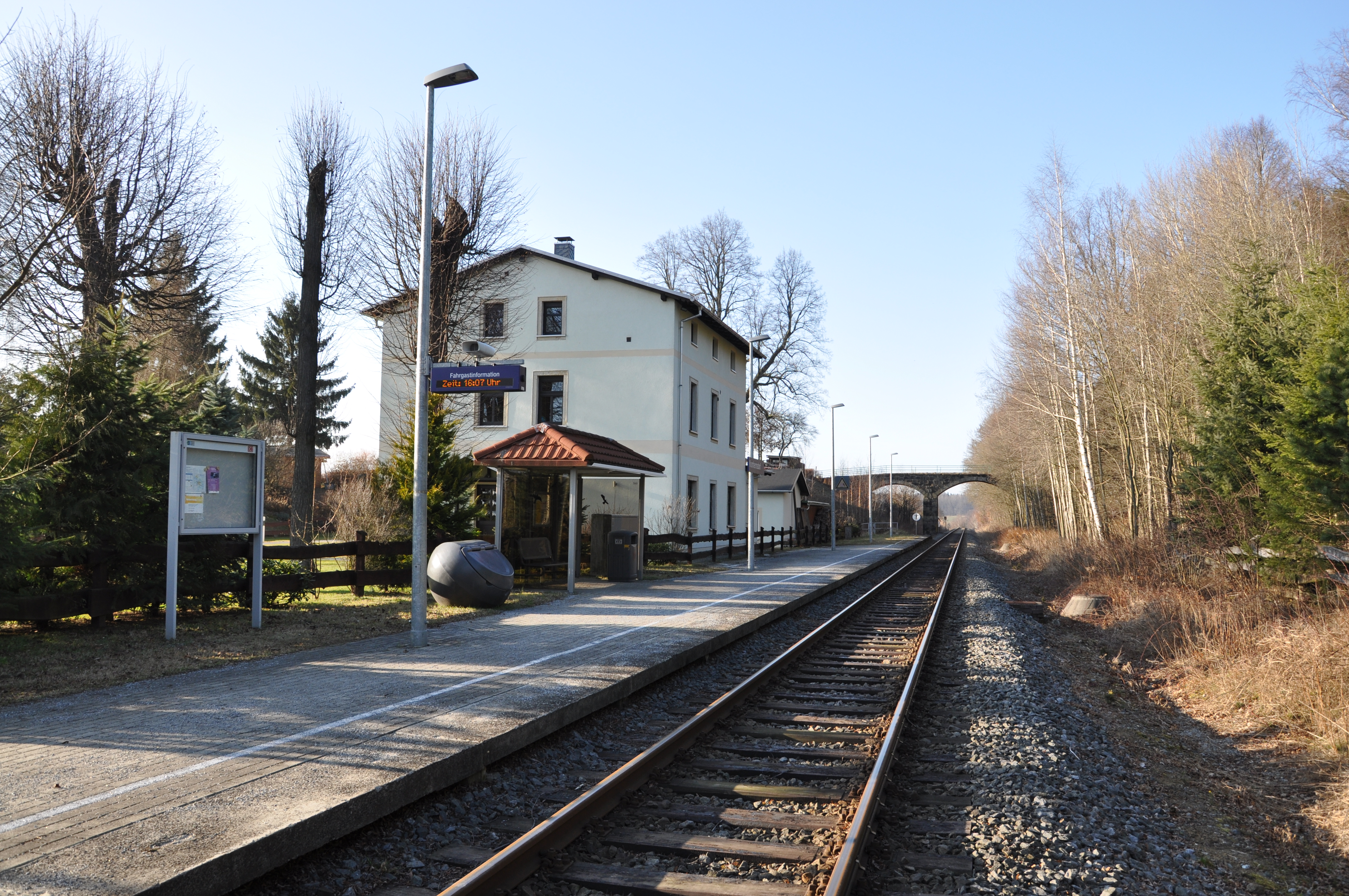
- Krumhermsdorf railway station

General information
- Location: Am Bahnhof 1, Krumhermsdorf, Saxony, Germany
- Coordinates: 50°59′35″N 14°12′25″E
- Line: Bautzen–Bad Schandau railway
- Platforms: 1
- Tracks: 1

History
- Opened: 1 July 1877; 149 years ago

Services
Preceding station	DB Regio Südost	Following station
Neustadt (Sachs) towards Pirna	RB 71	Sebnitz Terminus
Location
- Location within Saxony

Krumhermsdorf (German: Haltepunkt Krumhermsdorf) is a railway station in the village of Krumhermsdorf, a part of Neustadt in Sachsen, Saxony, Germany. The station lies on the Bautzen–Bad Schandau railway.

The station is served by DB Regio Südost. This service connects Pirna and Sebnitz via Neustadt in Sachsen.
