= Neukirch West station =

Railway station in Neukirch/Lausitz, Germany

Neukirch West
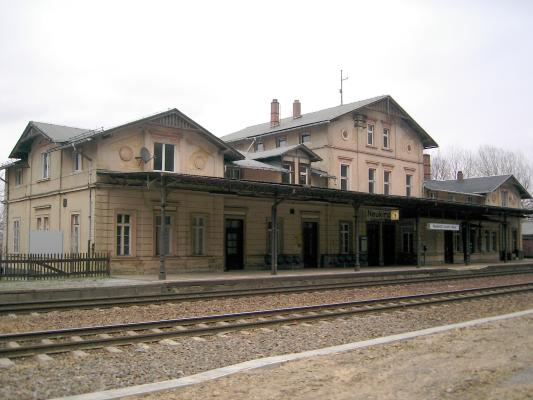
- Neukirch West railway station

General information
- Location: Bahnhofstraße 18, Neukirch/Lausitz, Saxony, Germany
- Coordinates: 51°05′04.0″N 14°16′15.4″E
- Lines: Bautzen–Bad Schandau railway Neukirch West–Bischofswerda railway
- Platforms: 2
- Tracks: 2

History
- Opened: 1877

Services
Preceding station	Trilex	Following station
Putzkau towards Dresden Hbf	RB 61	Neukirch Ost towards Zittau
Location
- Location within Saxony

Neukirch West (German: Bahnhof Neukirch West) is a railway station in the town of Neukirch/Lausitz, Saxony, Germany. The station lies on the Bautzen–Bad Schandau railway and Neukirch West–Bischofswerda railway.

The station is served by one train service, operated by Vogtlandbahn. There is a regular service from Dresden to Zittau via Bischofswerda, Wilthen and Ebersbach.
