= Neustadt (Sachs) station =

Railway station in Neustadt in Sachsen, Germany

Neustadt (Sachs)
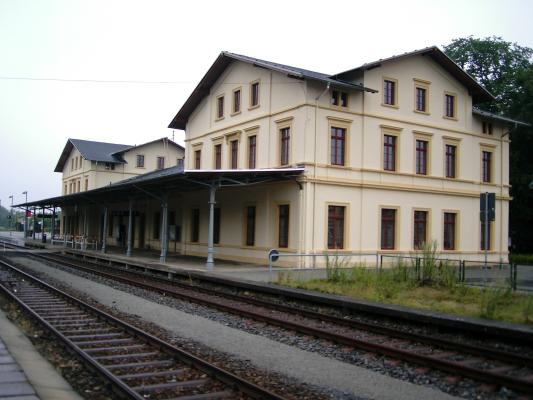
- Neustadt (Sachs) railway station

General information
- Location: Am Bahnhof 1, Neustadt in Sachsen, Saxony, Germany
- Coordinates: 51°01′16″N 14°12′50″E
- Lines: Bautzen–Bad Schandau railway Neustadt–Dürrröhrsdorf railway
- Platforms: 3
- Tracks: 5

History
- Opened: 1877; 149 years ago

Services
Preceding station	DB Regio Südost	Following station
Langenwolmsdorf towards Pirna	RB 71	Krumhermsdorf towards Sebnitz
Location
- Location within Saxony

Neustadt (Sachs) (German: Bahnhof Neustadt (Sachs)) is a railway station in the town of Neustadt in Sachsen, Saxony, Germany. The station lies on the Bautzen–Bad Schandau railway and Neustadt–Dürrröhrsdorf railway.

The station is served by DB Regio Südost. This service connects Pirna and Sebnitz via Neustadt.
