= Dolní Poustevna =

- Town
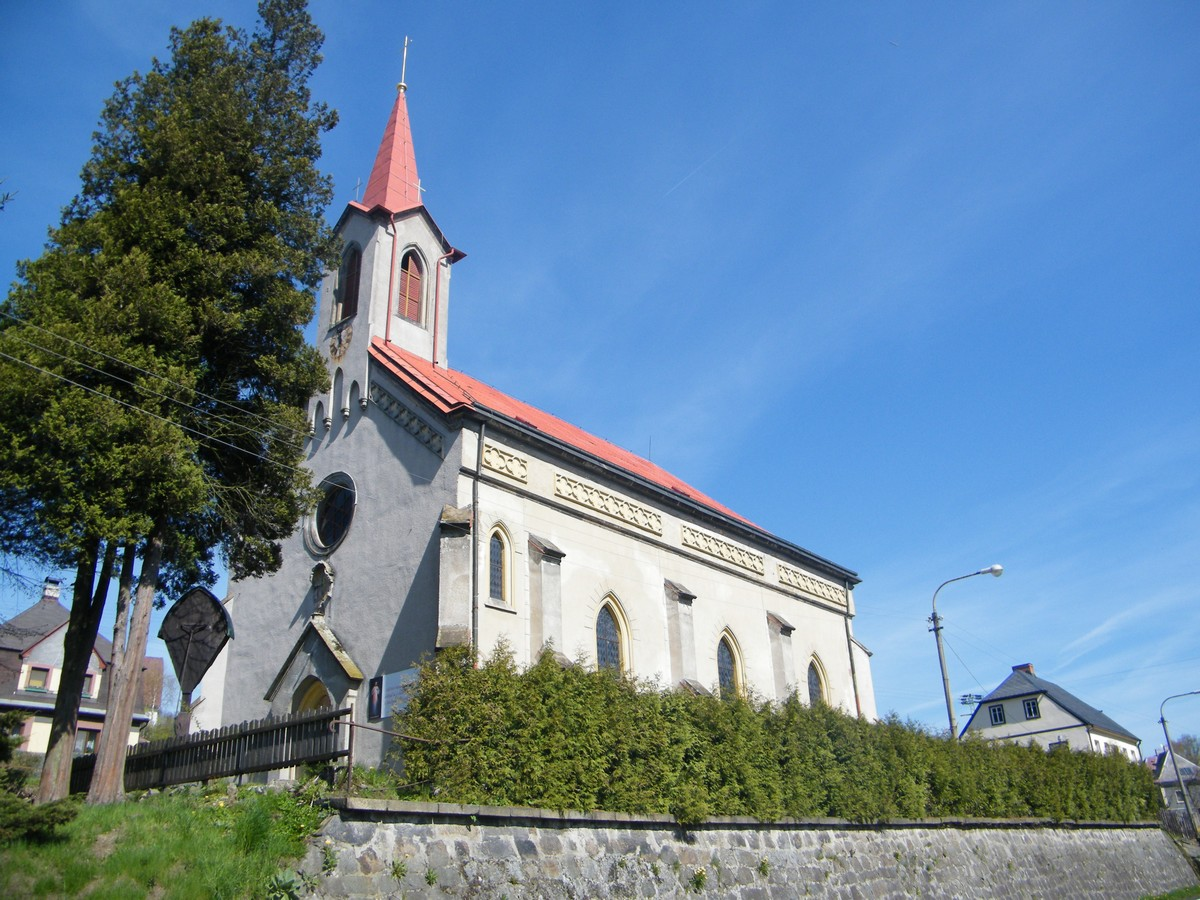
- Church of Saint Michael the Archangel

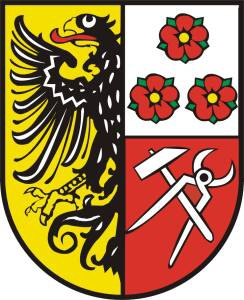
- Flag Coat of arms

- Location in the Czech Republic
- Coordinates: 50°58′57″N 14°17′13″E
- Country: Czech Republic
- Region: Ústí nad Labem
- District: Děčín
- First mentioned: 1241

Government
  - Mayor: Robert Holec

Area
  - Total: 11.05 km^{2} (4.27 sq mi)
- Elevation: 298 m (978 ft)

Population (2026-01-01)
  - Total: 1,673
  - Density: 151.4/km^{2} (392.1/sq mi)
- Time zone: UTC+1 (CET)
  - Summer (DST): UTC+2 (CEST)
- Postal code: 407 82
- Website: www.dolnipoustevna.cz

Dolní Poustevna (Czech pronunciation: [ˈdolɲiː ˈpoustɛvna]; German: Niedereinsiedel) is a town in Děčín District in the Ústí nad Labem Region of the Czech Republic. It has about 1,700 inhabitants. It is located in the Šluknov Hook area, on the border with Germany.

== Administrative division ==
Dolní Poustevna consists of five municipal parts (in brackets population according to the 2021 census):

- Dolní Poustevna (1,238)
- Horní Poustevna (236)
- Karlín (53)
- Marketa (44)
- Nová Víska (12)

== Etymology ==
Both the Czech name Poustevna and the initial German name Einsiedler mean 'hermitage'. The name of the locality was derived from a hermit who lived here in 1241. In the mid-15th century, two villages called Dolní ('lower') Poustevna and Horní ('upper') Poustevna began to be distinguished.

== Geography ==
Dolní Poustevna is located about 23 kilometres (14 mi) north of Děčín and 38 km (24 mi) northeast of Ústí nad Labem, on the border with Germany. It is located in the Šluknov Hook area and is adjacent to Sebnitz. It lies in the Lusatian Highlands. The highest point is a nameless hill at 510 m (1,673 ft) above sea level. The Sebnitz River (here called Vilémovský potok) flows along the southern municipal border, forming the Czech–German state border.

== History ==
The first written mention of the locality called Einsiedler (Poustevna) is in a deed of King Wenceslaus I from 1241. The village with the same name was founded in this locality around 1280. For most of its history, Dolní Poustevna belonged to the Tolštejn estate.

Paper was made in Dolní Poustevna from 1569 to 1906. It was evidently shipped to nearby cities, as musicologists have found instances of the paper (identifiable by watermark) in both Dresden and Prague.

== Demographics ==
Historical population

Year	Pop.	±%
1869	2,127	—
1880	2,518	+18.4%
1890	2,938	+16.7%
1900	3,608	+22.8%
1910	5,406	+49.8%

Year	Pop.	±%
1921	4,651	−14.0%
1930	4,809	+3.4%
1950	1,919	−60.1%
1961	1,839	−4.2%
1970	2,017	+9.7%

Year	Pop.	±%
1980	1,916	−5.0%
1991	1,746	−8.9%
2001	1,948	+11.6%
2011	1,824	−6.4%
2021	1,583	−13.2%

Source: Censuses

== Transport ==
Dolní Poustevna is located on the railway line Děčín–Rumburk via Bad Schandau and Sebnitz. There are two stops in the municipality: Dolní Poustevna and Horní Poustevna.

On the Czech–German border are the railway border crossing and the road border crossing Dolní Poustevna / Sebnitz.

== Sights ==
The most valuable building is the castle in Horní Poustevna. It was built in the Baroque style in 1736–1738. Today it is privately owned.

A notable landmark is the Church of Saint Michael the Archangel. It was built in the pseudo-Gothic style in 1854–1855.

== Twin towns – sister cities ==
Dolní Poustevna is twinned with:

- Sebnitz, Germany
