= Löbau (Sachs) station =

Railway station in Löbau, Germany

Löbau (Sachs)
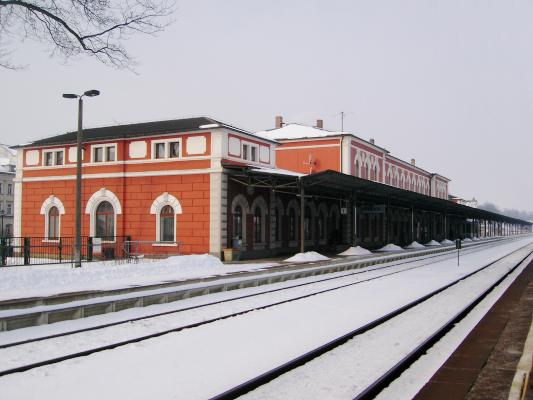
- Löbau (Sachs) station

General information
- Location: Löbau, Saxony, Germany
- Coordinates: 51°05′58″N 14°40′16″E
- Lines: Görlitz–Dresden railway Ebersbach–Löbau railway Großpostwitz–Löbau railway (closed); Löbau–Radibor railway (closed)
- Platforms: 3

History
- Opened: 23 December 1846

Services
Preceding station	Trilex	Following station
Bautzen towards Dresden Hbf	RE 1	Görlitz towards Zgorzelec
Breitendorf towards Dresden Hbf	RB 60	Zoblitz towards Görlitz
Location
- Location within Saxony

Löbau (Sachs) (German: Bahnhof Löbau (Sachs)) is a railway station in the town of Löbau, Saxony, Germany. The station lies on the Görlitz–Dresden railway and Ebersbach–Löbau railway, also on the former Großpostwitz–Löbau railway and Löbau–Radibor railway.

== Train services ==
The station is served by regional and local services, which are operated by Trilex.

== Bus services ==
- 22 Löbau – Zittau
- 27 Löbau – Zittau
- 42 Löbau – Bernstadt – Görlitz
- 50 Löbau – Oppach – Ebersbach – Neugersdorf
- 52 Löbau – Schönbach – Neusalza-Spremberg
- 53 Löbau-Dürrhennersdorf – Friedersdorf-Ebersbach
- 55 Löbau – Kottmarsdorf – Neugersdorf
- 56 Löbau – Obercunnersdorf – Neugersdorf
- 60 Löbau – Ottenhain – Herwigsdorf
- 62 Löbau – Lautitz – Weißenberg/Mauschwitz
- 64 Löbau – Kittlitz – Krappe – Weißenberg
- 67 Löbau Town Service
- 68 Löbau – Bischdorf – Rosenhain – Löbau
- 69 Löbau – Georgewitz – Bellwitz – Kittlitz
