= Observation Tower at Goetzinger's Height =

Coordinates: 51°00′40″N 14°12′28″E

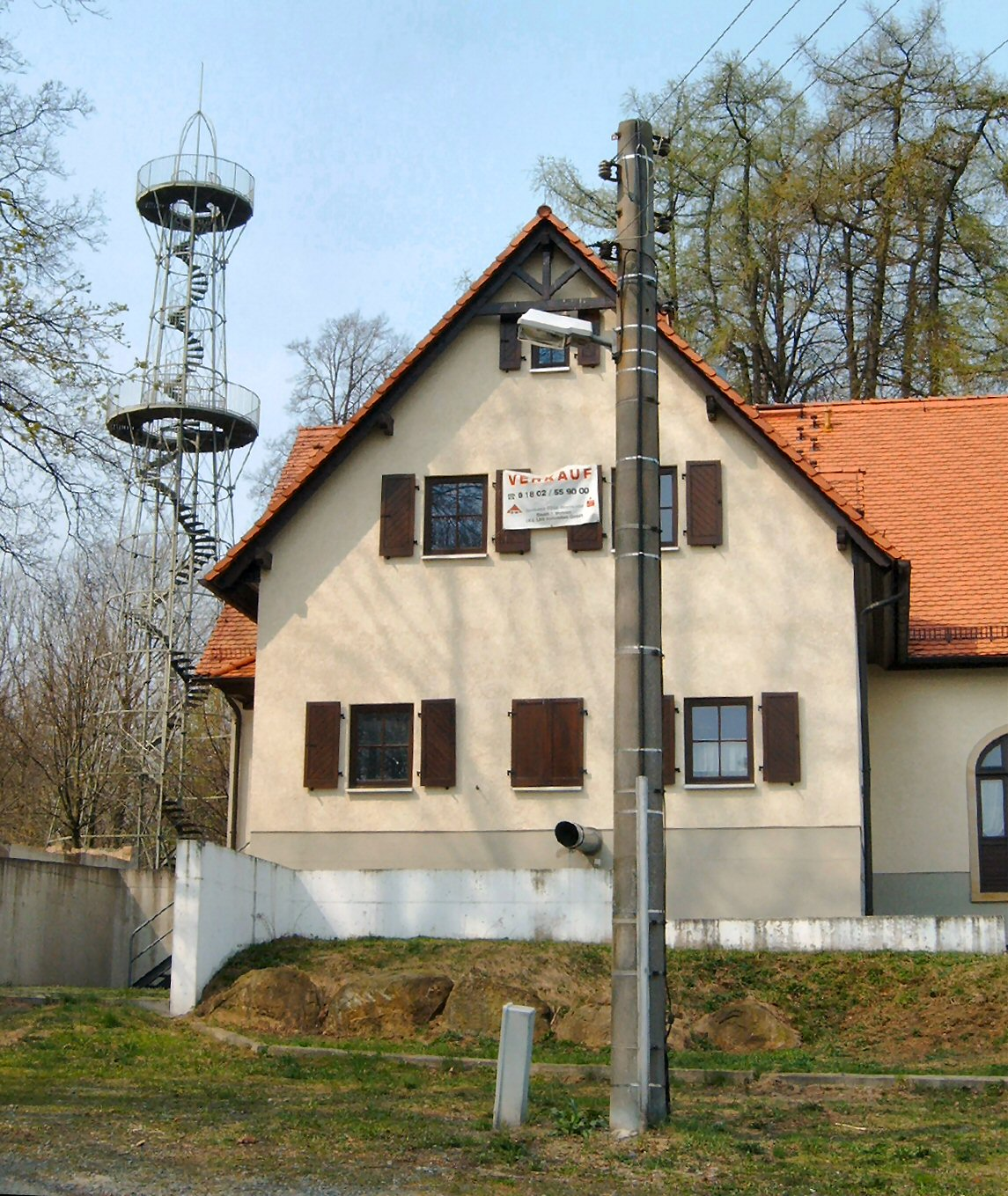
Observation Tower at Goetzinger's Height

The Observation Tower at Goetzinger's Height is a 25-metre-tall (82 ft) observation tower on Goetzinger's Height (Götzingerhöhe), a small mountain near Neustadt in Sachsen, Germany, named after Wilhelm Leberecht Götzinger.

The Observation Tower at Goetzinger's Height was built in 1883, together with an inn in its proximity. Therefore, it is older than Eiffel Tower and one of the oldest lattice towers in the world. In 1992 the observation tower, from which there is a nice view of the Elbe Sandstone Mountains, the Ore Mountains and the Lusatian Highlands, was renovated. The inn situated close to the tower was closed for a longer period and reopened on 1 April 2006.

== See also ==
- List of towers
