= Dolní Poustevna railway station =

Railway station in Dolní Poustevna, Czech Republic

Dolní Poustevna
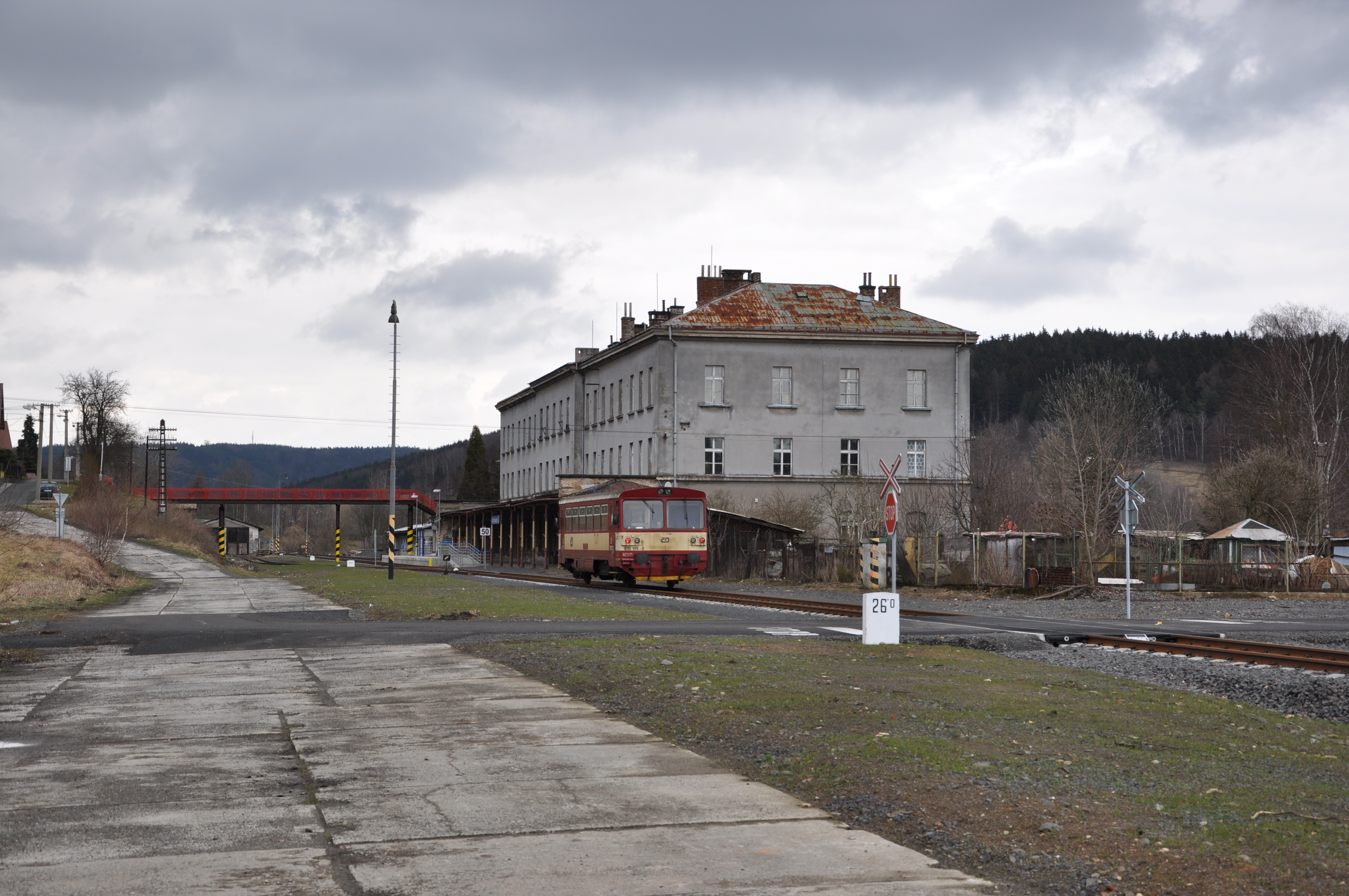
- Dolní Poustevna railway station

General information
- Location: Dolní Poustevna, Ústí nad Labem; Czech Republic
- Coordinates: 50°58′58″N 14°17′02″E
- Platforms: 1
- Tracks: 2

Other information
- Station code: 54565291

History
- Rebuilt: 2009; 17 years ago

Services
Preceding station	DB Regio Südost	Following station
Horní Poustevna towards Rumburk	U 28	Sebnitz towards Děčín main
Location

Dolní Poustevna (Czech: Dolní Poustevna, until 1945 German: Nieder Einsiedel) is a railway station in the town of Dolní Poustevna, Ústí nad Labem Region, Czech Republic. The station was modernised in 2009 with the removal of old tracks and building new platforms. The station used to be a border station with Germany, where it connects to the German network at Sebnitz. The cross-border connection was closed in 1945 and reopened in July 2014. The station is now served by České dráhy in cooperation with DB Regio: the National Park Railway. This service connects Děčín and Rumburk via Bad Schandau and Sebnitz. The original station building has been sold.

== Train services ==
The station is served by the following services:

- Osobní (local stopping service) Děčín hl.n. – Bad Schandau – Sebnitz – Dolní Poustevna – Mikulášovice – Rumburk
