= Bautzen–Bad Schandau railway line =

Railway line in Germany

Bautzen–Bad Schandau
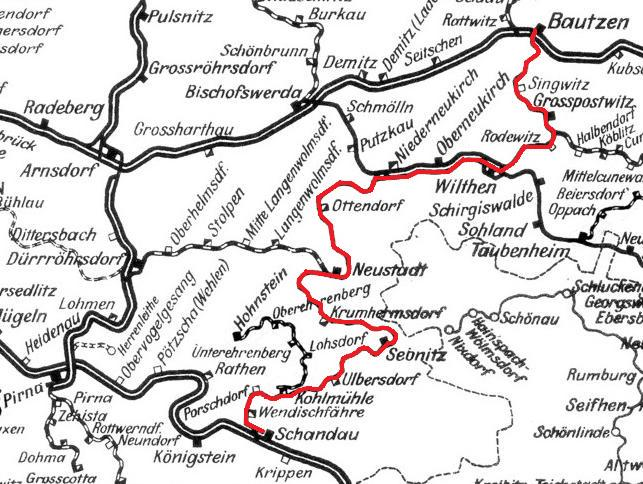

Overview
- Status: Operational
- Owner: DB Netz
- Locale: Germany (Saxony)
- Termini: Bautzen railway station; Bad Schandau railway station

Service
- System: Deutsche Bahn
- Operator(s): DB Regio Südost

History
- Opened: 1877

Technical
- Line length: 64 km (40 mi)
- Track gauge: 1,435 mm (4 ft 8 1/2 in) standard gauge
- Electrification: Not electrified

The Bautzen–Bad Schandau railway line is a 65-kilometre long railway line in the state of Saxony, Germany, which connects Bautzen to Bad Schandau via Neukirch/Lausitz, Neustadt in Sachsen and Sebnitz. The railway was opened fully in 1898. The part between Neustadt in Sachsen and Bad Schandau is also known as Sebnitztalbahn (Sebnitz valley railway). Today only the sections of Wilthen–Oberottendorf and Neustadt–Bad Schandau are still in operation.

== History ==
Construction of the line began in 1874 and by the inauguration in 1877 had cost 9.8 million Reichsmark, 1 million of which going to the construction of the bridge over the Elbe at Bad Schandau. The Neustadt-Bad Schandau section opened on 1 July 1877 and the Bautzen-Neustadt section opened on 1 September 1877. Trains travelling on the 65 km long railway needed approximately 2 hours and 40 minutes. In Wilthen und Neustadt at the time, direct connections existed to the trains from and to Ebersbach and Dürrröhrsdorf.

The railway celebrated its centenary on 1 July 1977. The central point was Sebnitz railway station, where an exhibition of trains was presented. Special trips were run on the heritage trains of the Deutsche Reichsbahn.

The freight section between Bautzen and Wilthen closed on 31 December 1994. Since 12 December 2004, the non-stop passenger trains between Bautzen and Neustadt have also stopped. The section Neukirch-Wilthen is still used by local trains connecting Dresden and Zittau.

== Services ==
The Bautzen–Bad Schandau railway is used by the following passenger services:

- RE 2 Dresden Hbf - Bischofswerda − Ebersbach (Sachs) − Zittau (between Neukirch West and Wilthen)
- RB 61 Dresden Hbf − Bischofswerda − Ebersbach (Sachs) − Zittau (between Neukirch West and Wilthen)
- RB 71 Pirna - Neustadt - Bad Schandau (between Neustadt and Bad Schandau).

=== Images ===
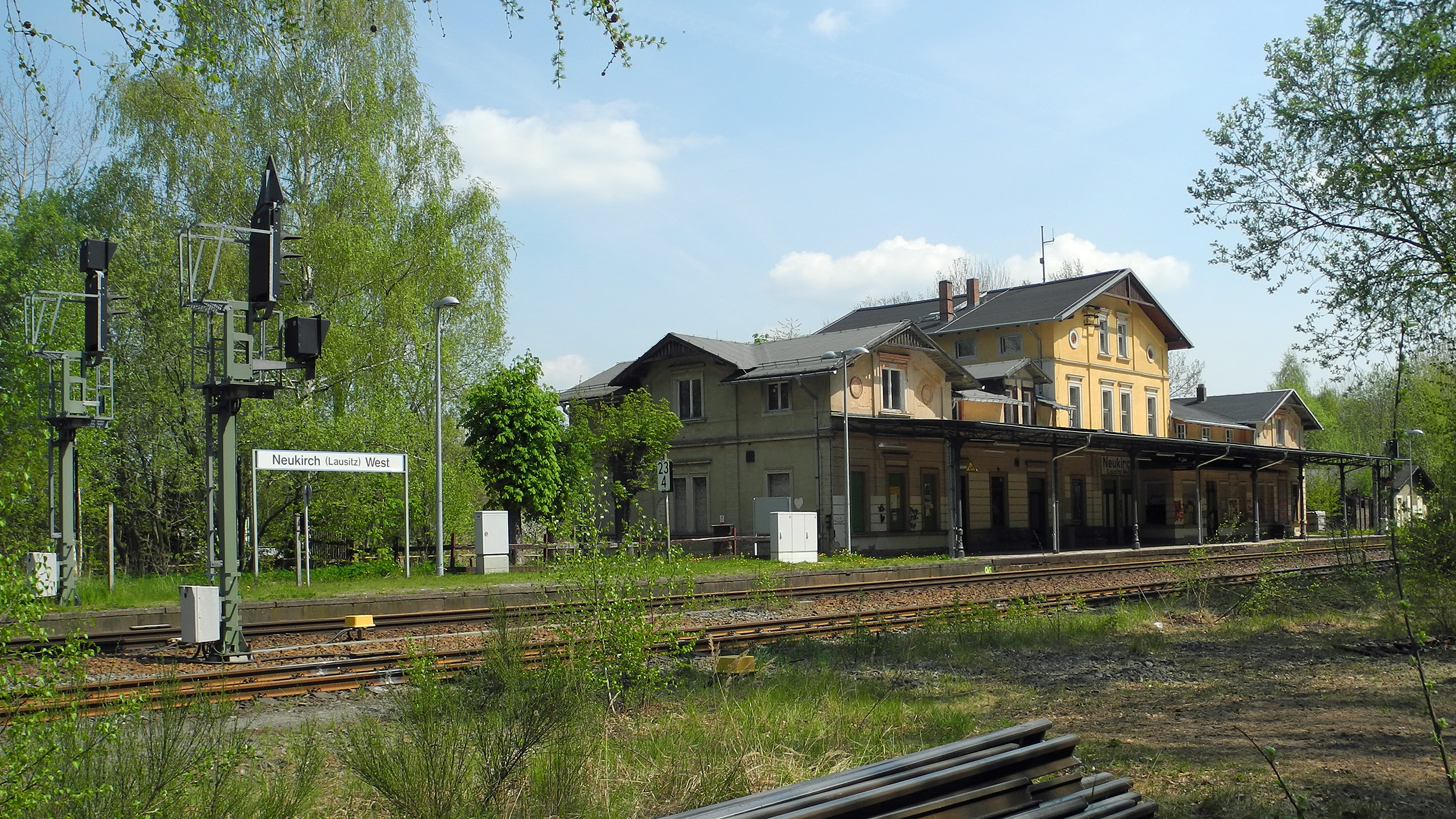
Station of Neukirch West, in German Neukirch (Lausitz) West

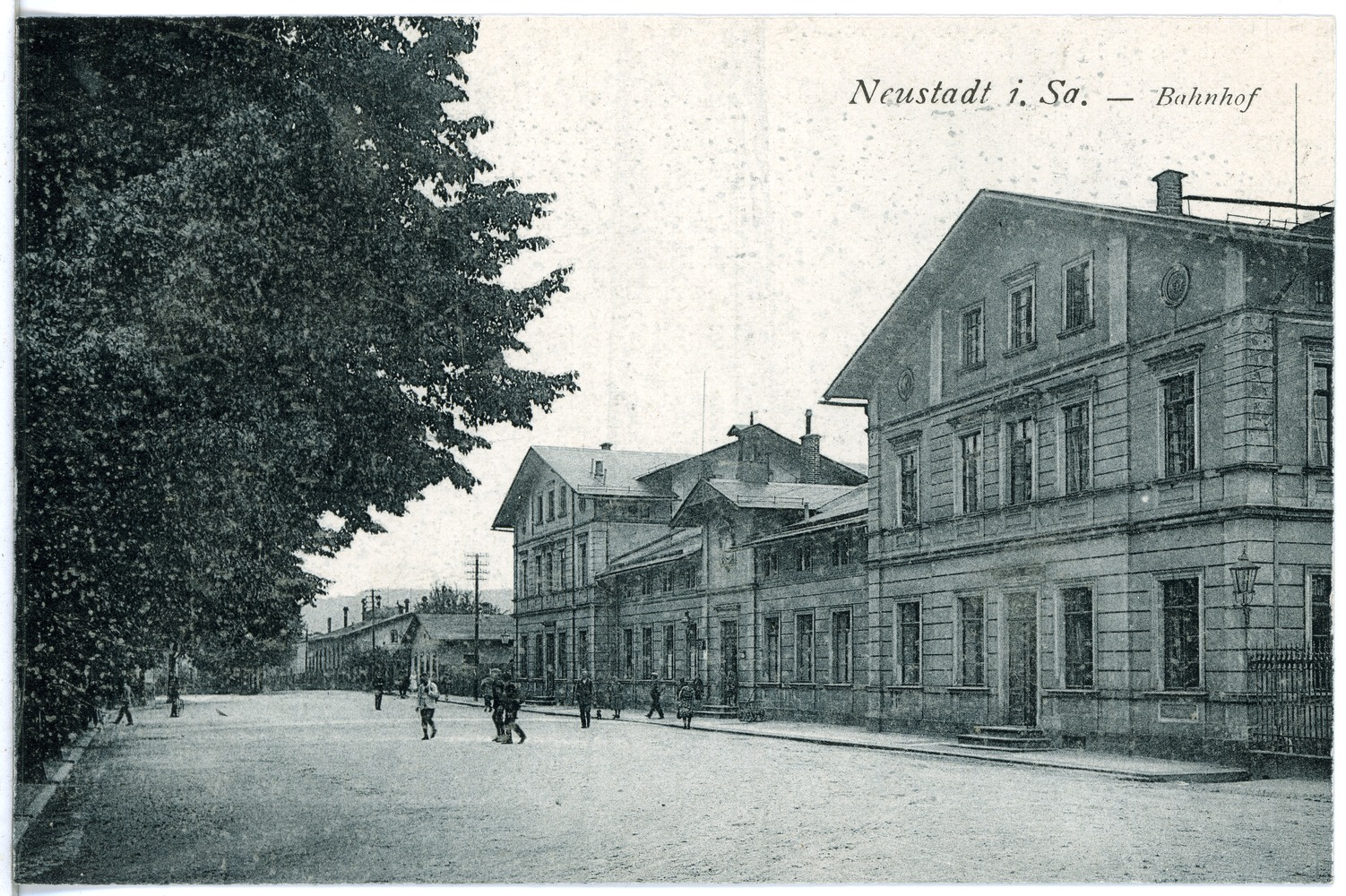
Neustadt (Sachs) station postcard, 1923

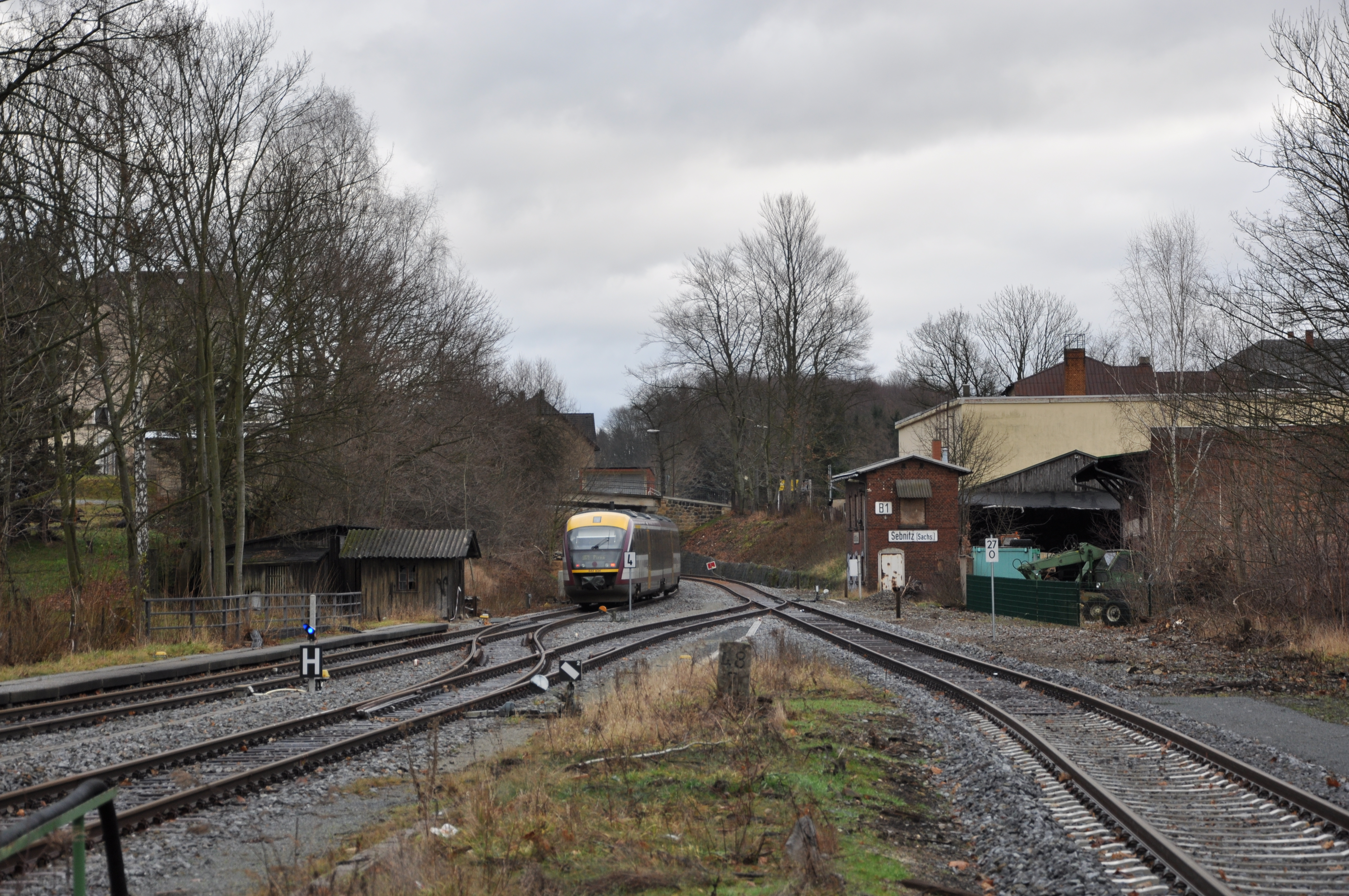
Train at Sebnitz, 2013

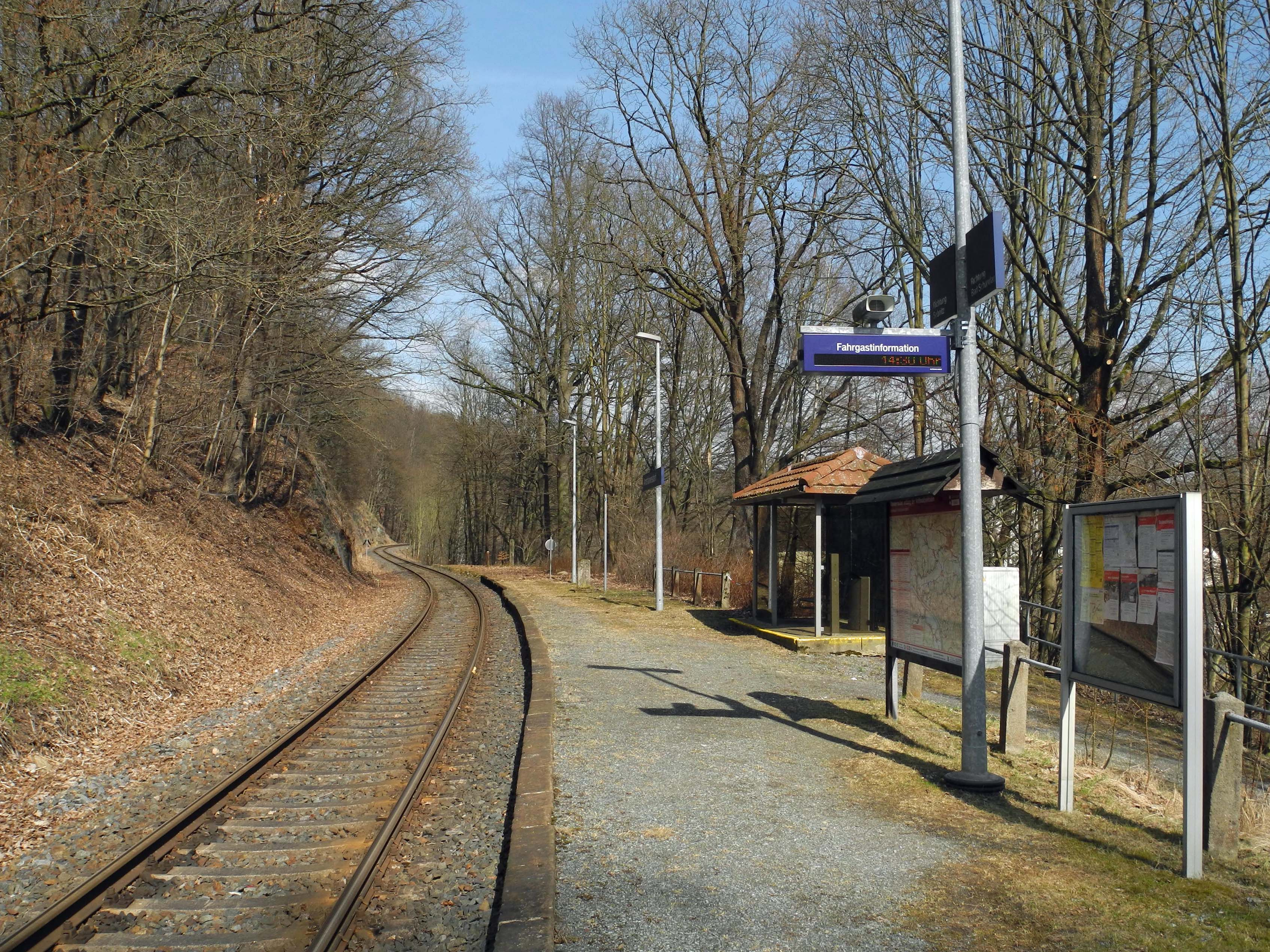
Amtshainersdorf, 2018

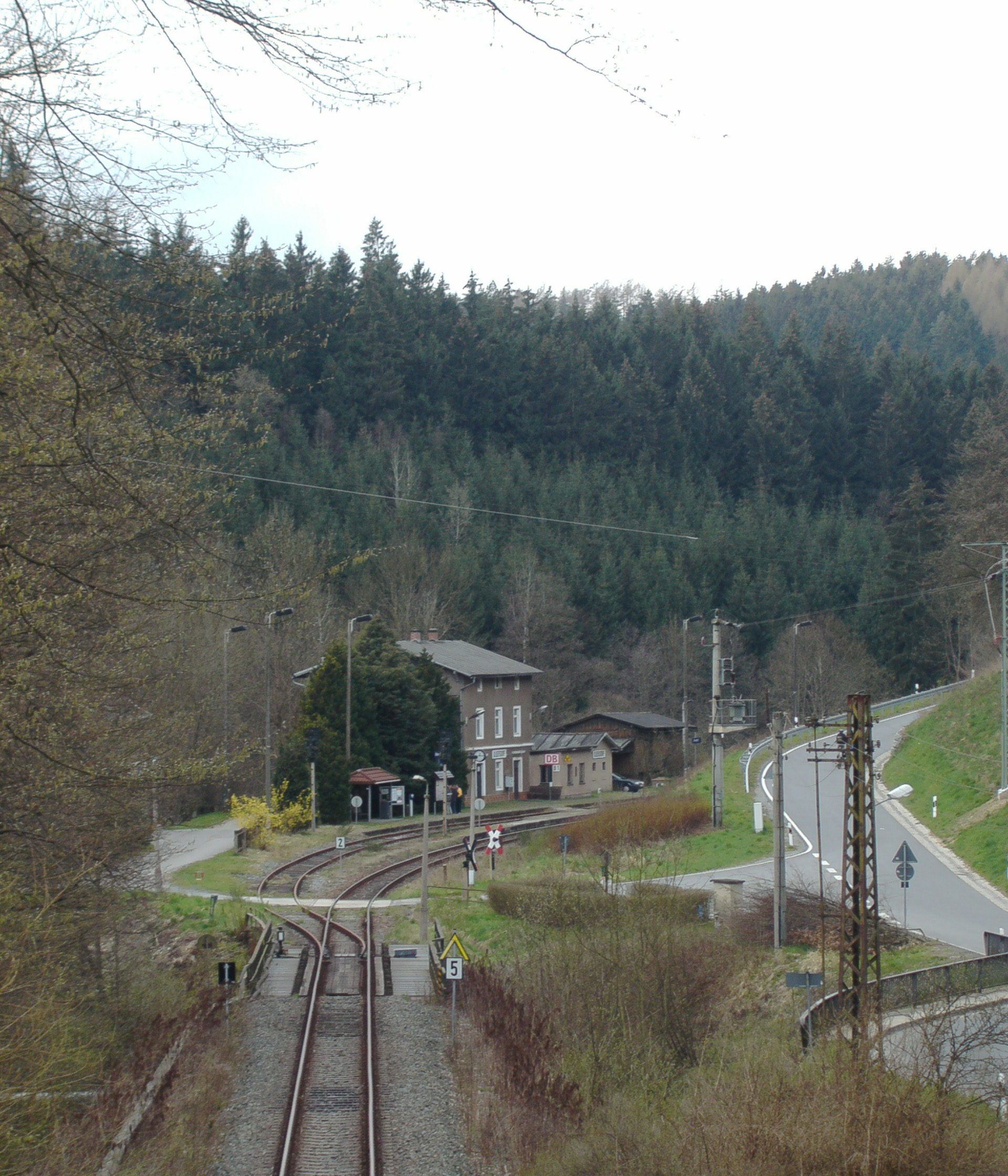
Ulbersdorf station, 2007

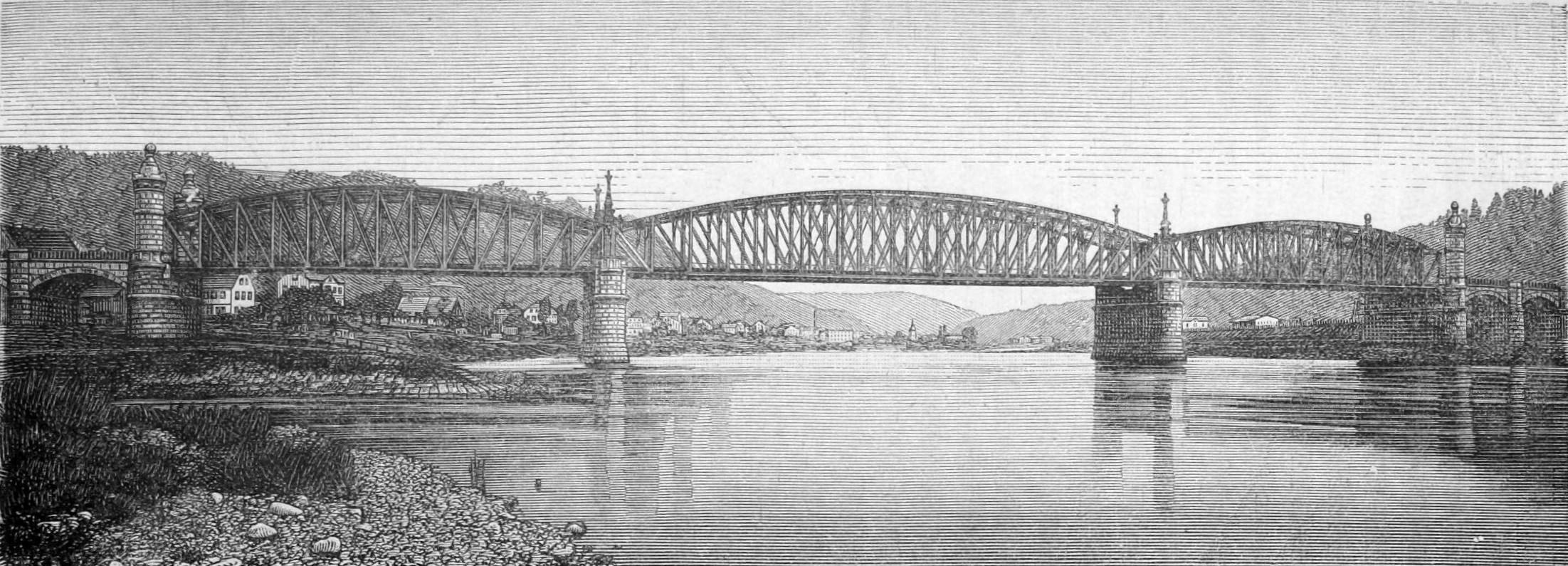
Former Carolabrücke in Bad Schandau, 1878

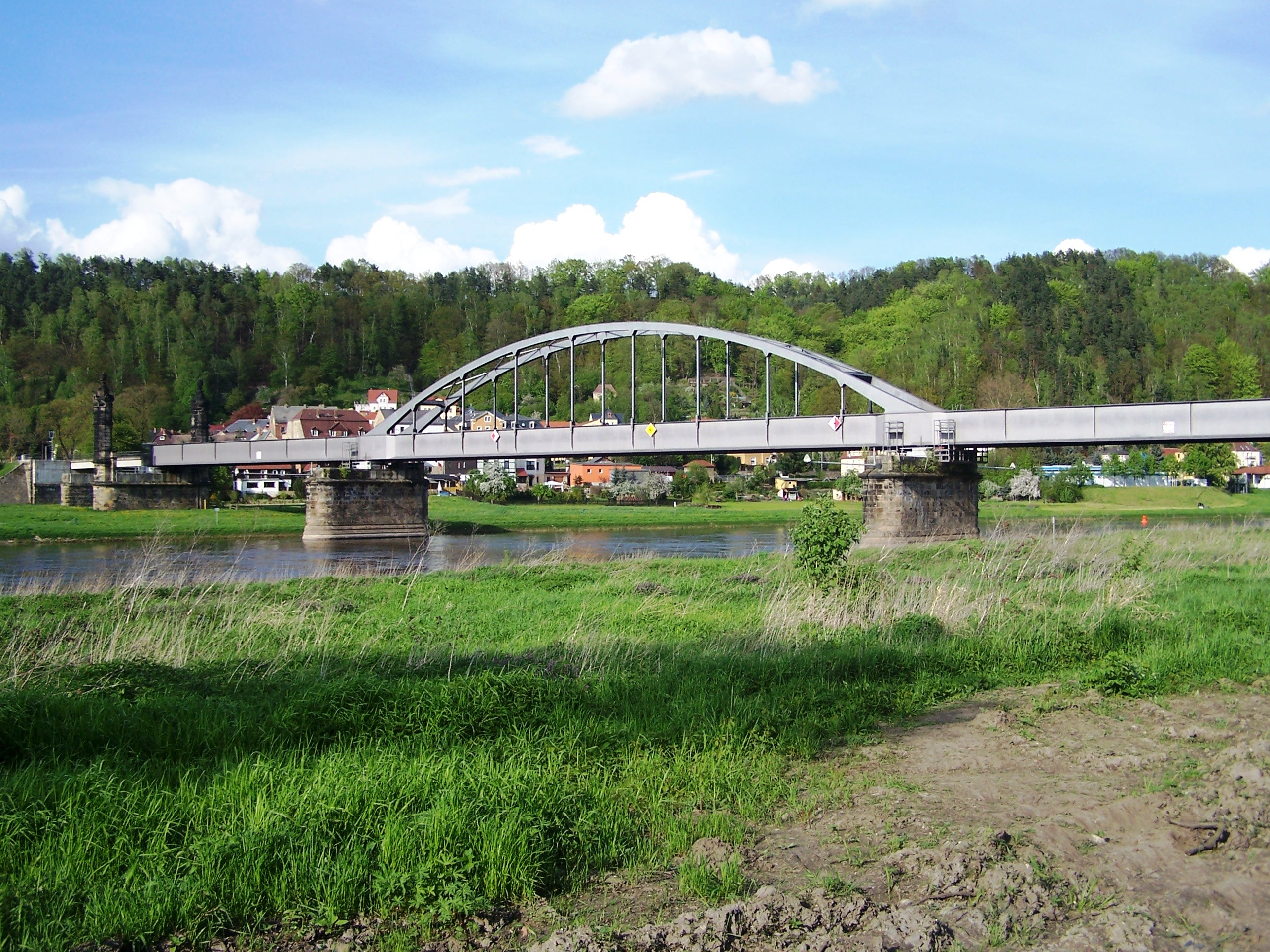
New Carolabrücke in Bad Schandau, 2008

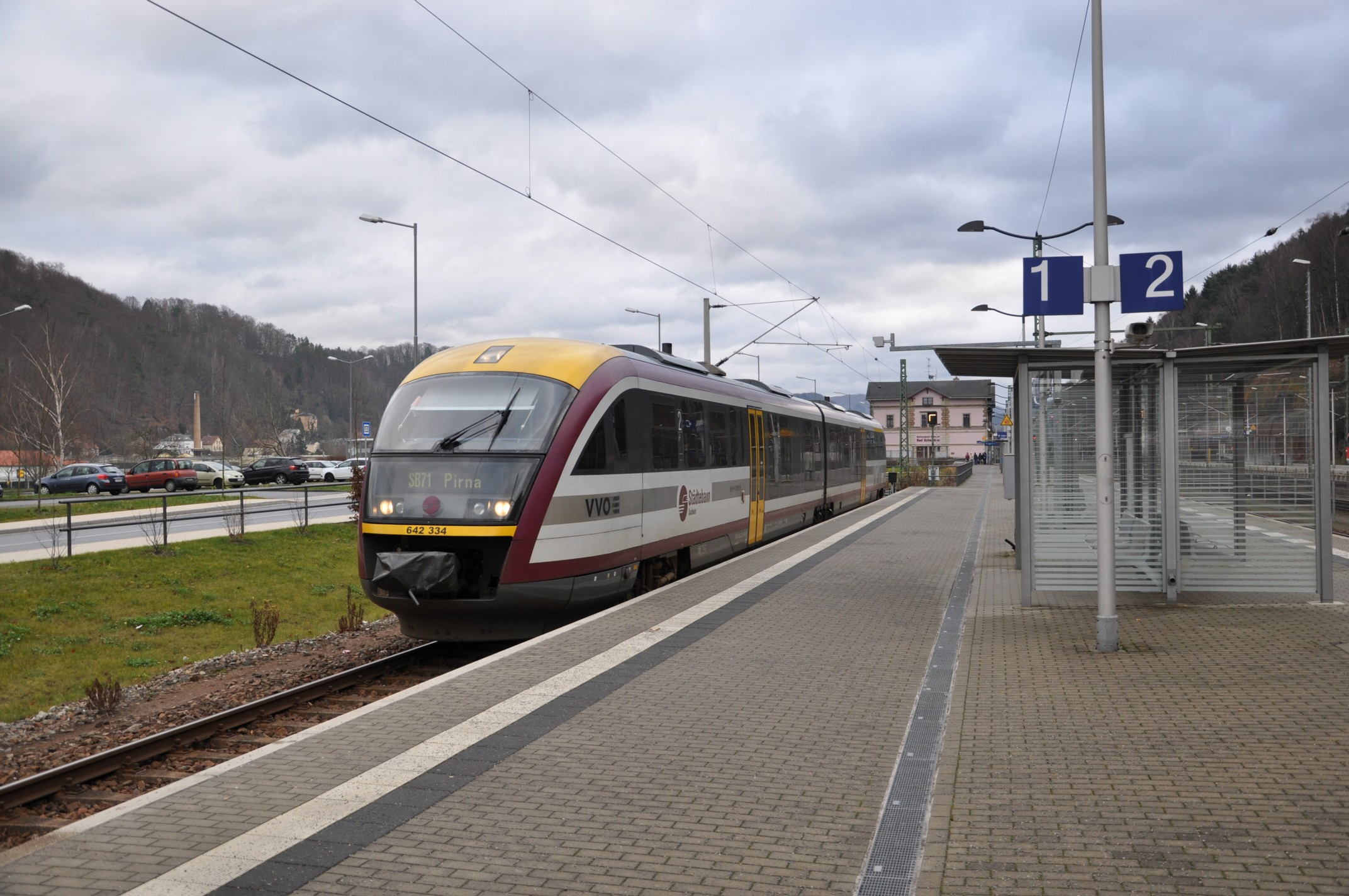
Städtebahn Sachsen engine at Bad Schandau station, 2013
