= Amtshainersdorf station =

Railway station in Saxony, Germany

Amtshainersdorf
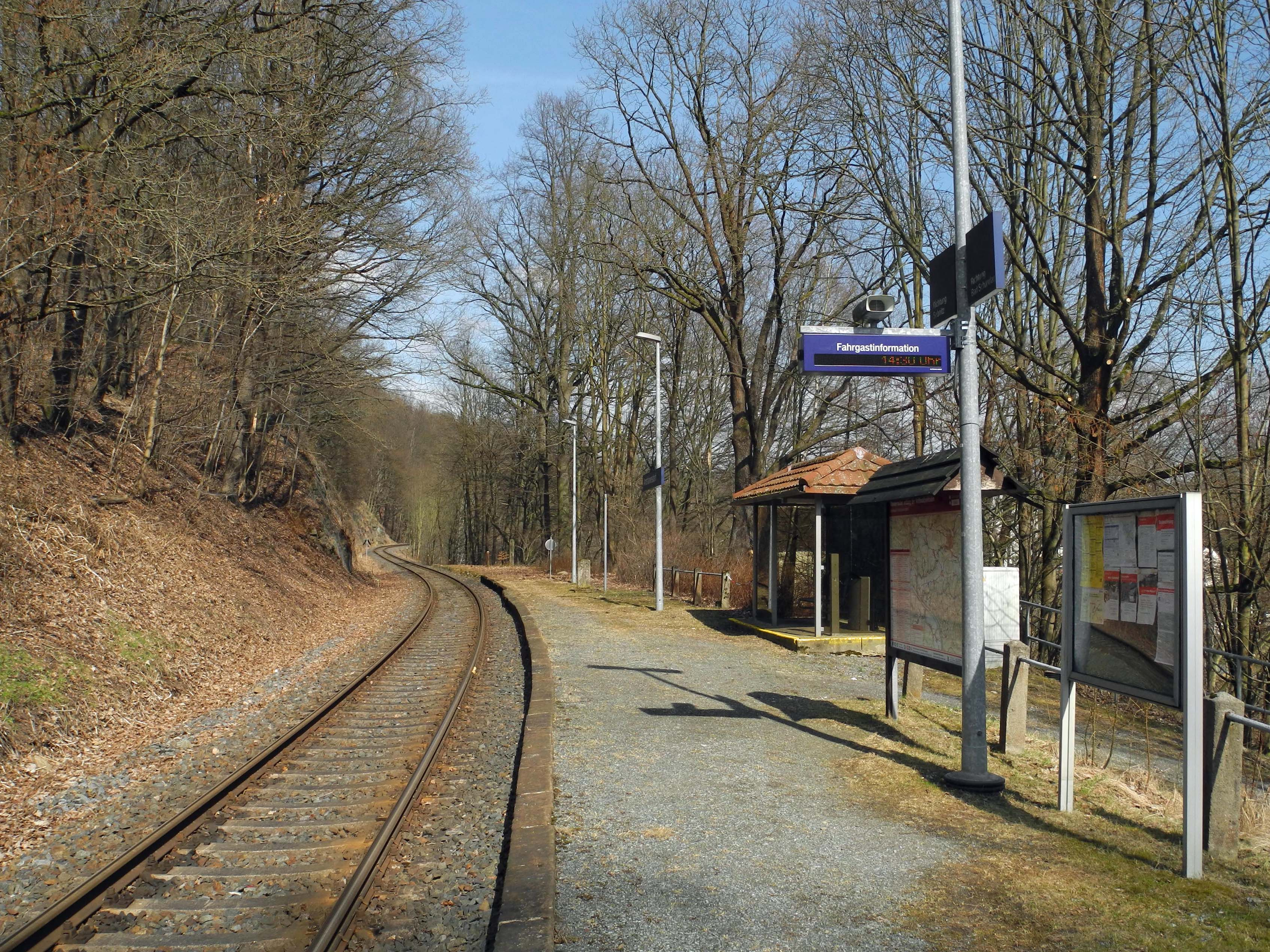
- Amtshainersdorf railway station

General information
- Location: Amtshainersdorf, Saxony, Germany
- Coordinates: 50°57′59″N 14°13′56″E
- Line: Bautzen–Bad Schandau railway
- Platforms: 1
- Tracks: 1

Services
Preceding station	DB Regio Südost	Following station
Ulbersdorf towards Děčín main	U 28	Sebnitz towards Rumburk
Location
- Location within Saxony

Amtshainersdorf (German: Bahnhof Amtshainersdorf) is a railway station in the village of Amtshainersdorf, Saxony, Germany. The station lies on the Bautzen–Bad Schandau railway. The station is served by one train service, operated by DB Regio in cooperation with České dráhy: the National Park Railway. This service connects Děčín and Rumburk via Bad Schandau and Sebnitz.
