= Bautzen station =

Railway station in Bautzen, Germany

Bautzen/Budyšin
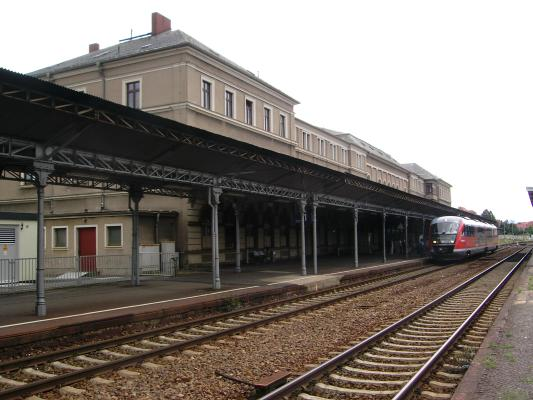
- Bautzen railway station

General information
- Location: Bautzen, Saxony, Germany
- Coordinates: 51°10′22″N 14°25′44″E
- Lines: Görlitz–Dresden railway Bautzen–Bad Schandau railway (closed); Bautzen–Hoyerswerda railway (closed)
- Platforms: 3
- Tracks: 21

History
- Opened: 23 June 1846

Services
Preceding station	Trilex	Following station
Bischofswerda towards Dresden Hbf	RE 1	Löbau (Sachs) towards Zgorzelec
Seitschen towards Dresden Hbf	RB 60	Kubschütz towards Görlitz
Location
- Location within Saxony

Bautzen/Budyšin (German: Bahnhof Bautzen; Upper Sorbian: Dwórnišćo Budyšin, pronounced [ˈdwʊʁnʲiʃtʃɔ ˈbudɨʃin]) is a railway station in the town of Bautzen, Saxony, Germany. The station lies on the Görlitz–Dresden railway line and the Bautzen–Bad Schandau railway line, the latter now not running to Bautzen. The station is also on the former Bautzen–Hoyerswerda railway.

== History ==
The former engine shed or Bahnbetriebswerk of Bautzen ("Bw Bautzen") was located at Bautzen railway station towards the railway exit to Löbau/Görlitz and next to the industrial side of the old German Coach Works (Waggonbau Bautzen), today's Bombardier Transportation.

From the opening of the Görlitz–Dresden railway in 1846, it belonged to the Saxon-Silesian Railway Company, which was nationalized in 1851. In 1922, the Görlitz–Dresden railway was nationalized to the Reichsbahndirektion Dresden. Following the restructuring of the railways after the Second World War, Bautzen was incorporated into Reichsbahndirektion Cottbus.

During the Battle of Bautzen (1945) the station was set alight. After the war, the station building was rebuilt in a simplified form. The artist Alfred Herzog created eight sgraffiti in the station hall depicting LOWA wagon construction and traditional industries in Bautzen and the region.

In 1950 the sheds at both Bahnbetriebswerk Löbau and Bahnbetriebswerk Zittau still existed with trains leaving here hauled by locomotives of many different classes. These locomotives were similar to those during the Saxon state railway times.

Until 14 May 1988, working engines of Class 52 were still stabled here for scheduled services and for use as heating engines. Many of these engines are still used to this day.

In February 2014, the reception building was closed due to falling parts of the ceiling. An investor estimated the repairs at €5 million. Building worked lasted from 2017 to 2020, and the renovated reception building was opened on 24 January 2020.

== Train services ==
The station is served by regional and local services operated by Trilex.

In 2006 the railway station was used by 2,500 passengers.

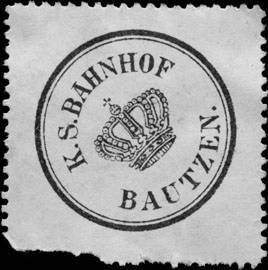
Sealing stamp of Kingdom of Saxony, c. 1850

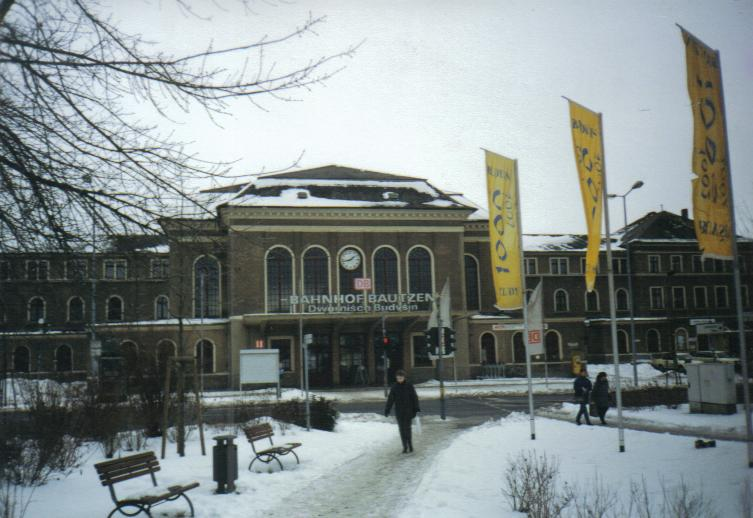
Station in 2002

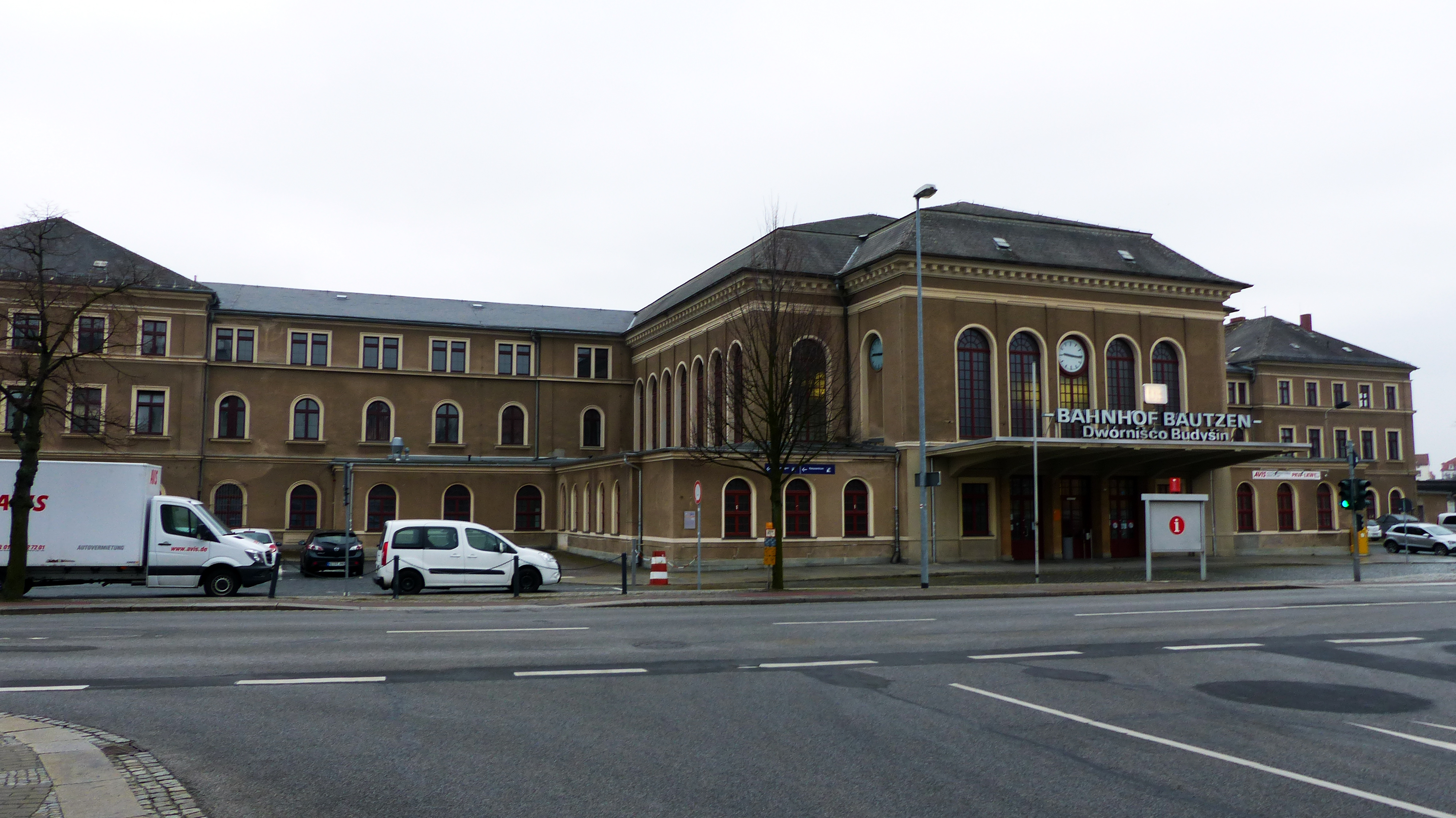
Station in 2015

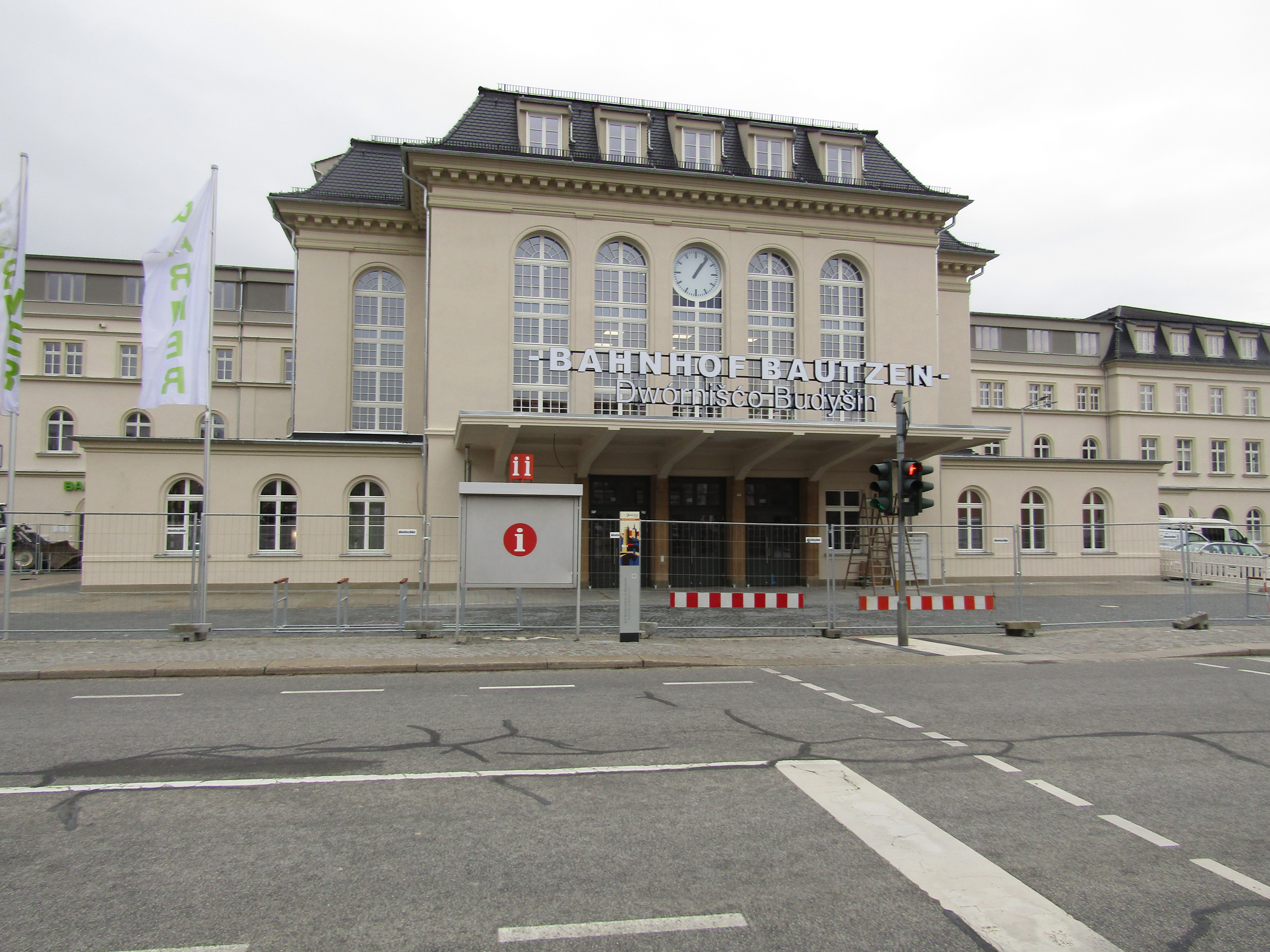
During renovations, 2019

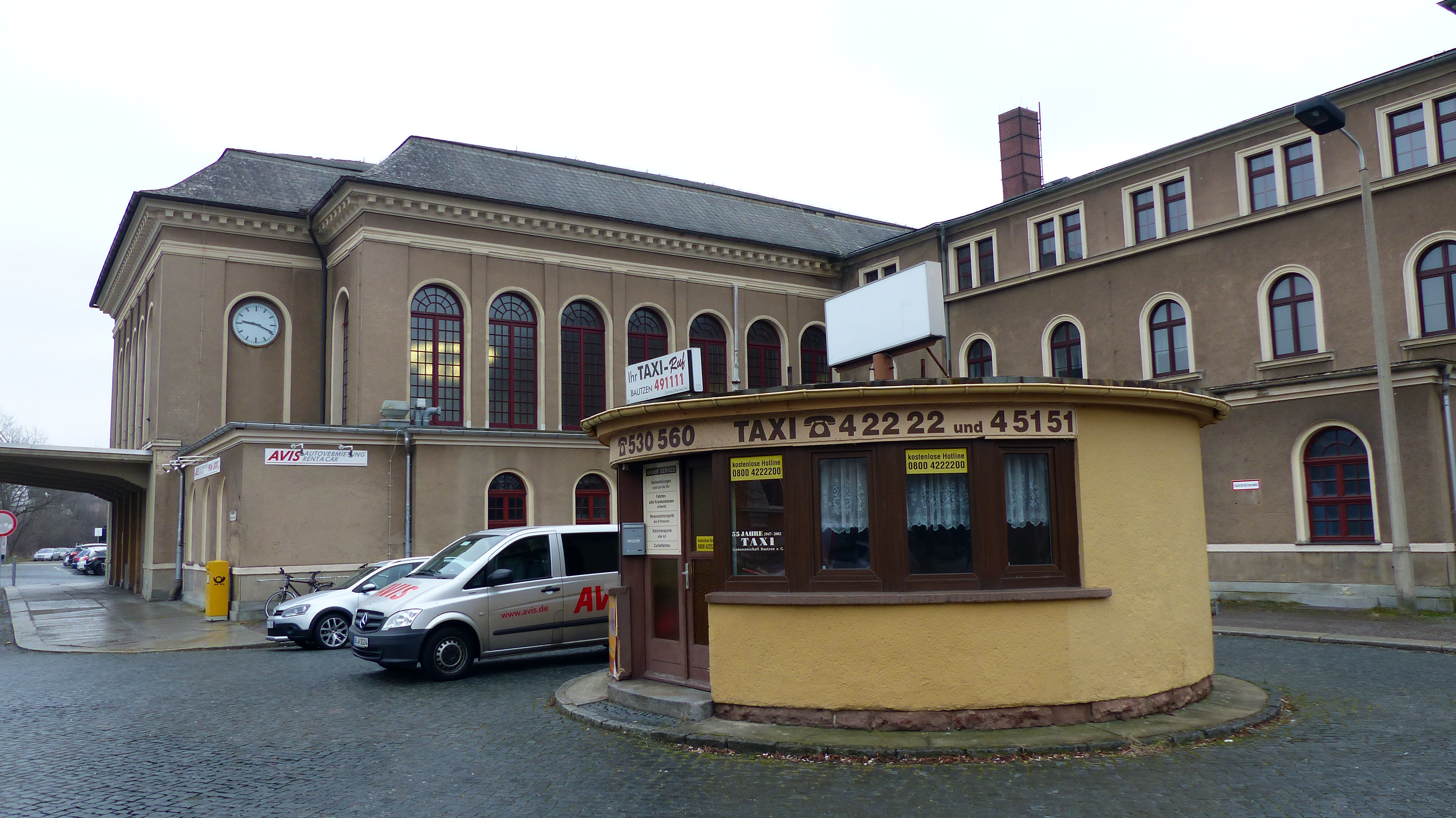
Taxi rank, 2015

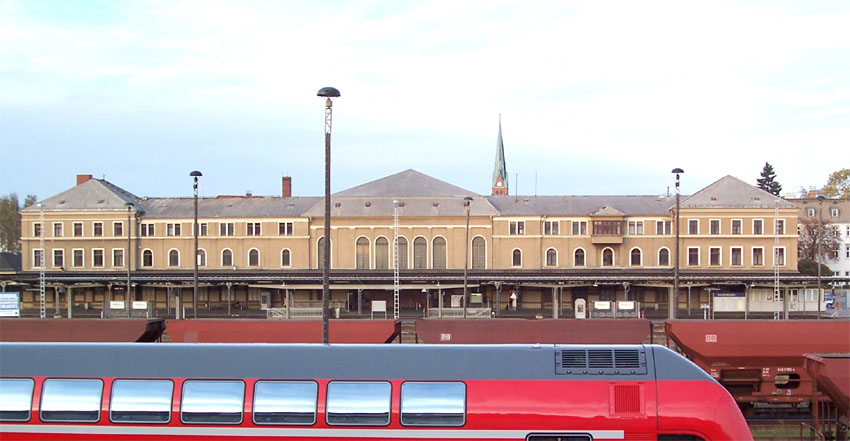
Station from the south, 2006

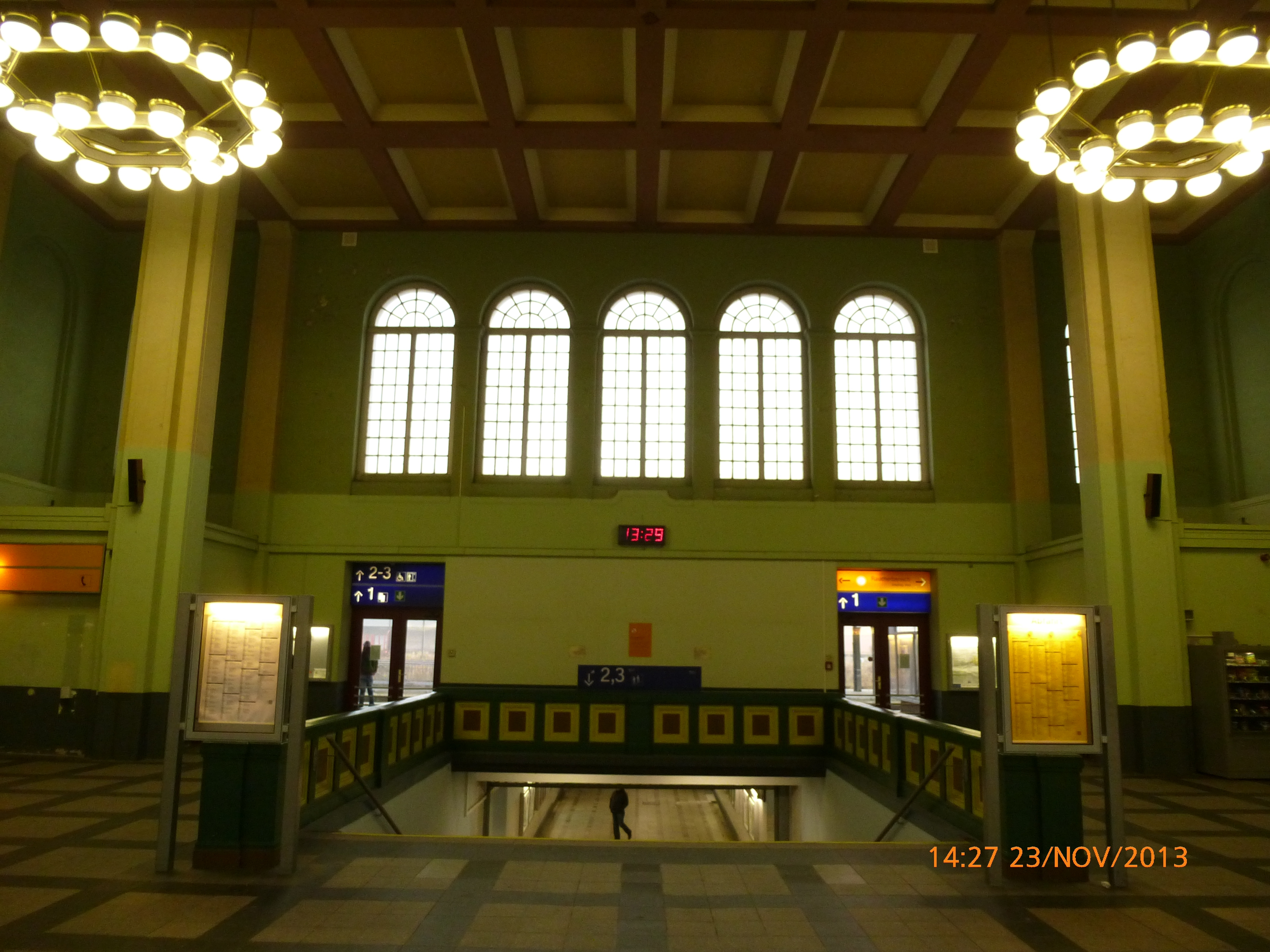
Station hall, 2013

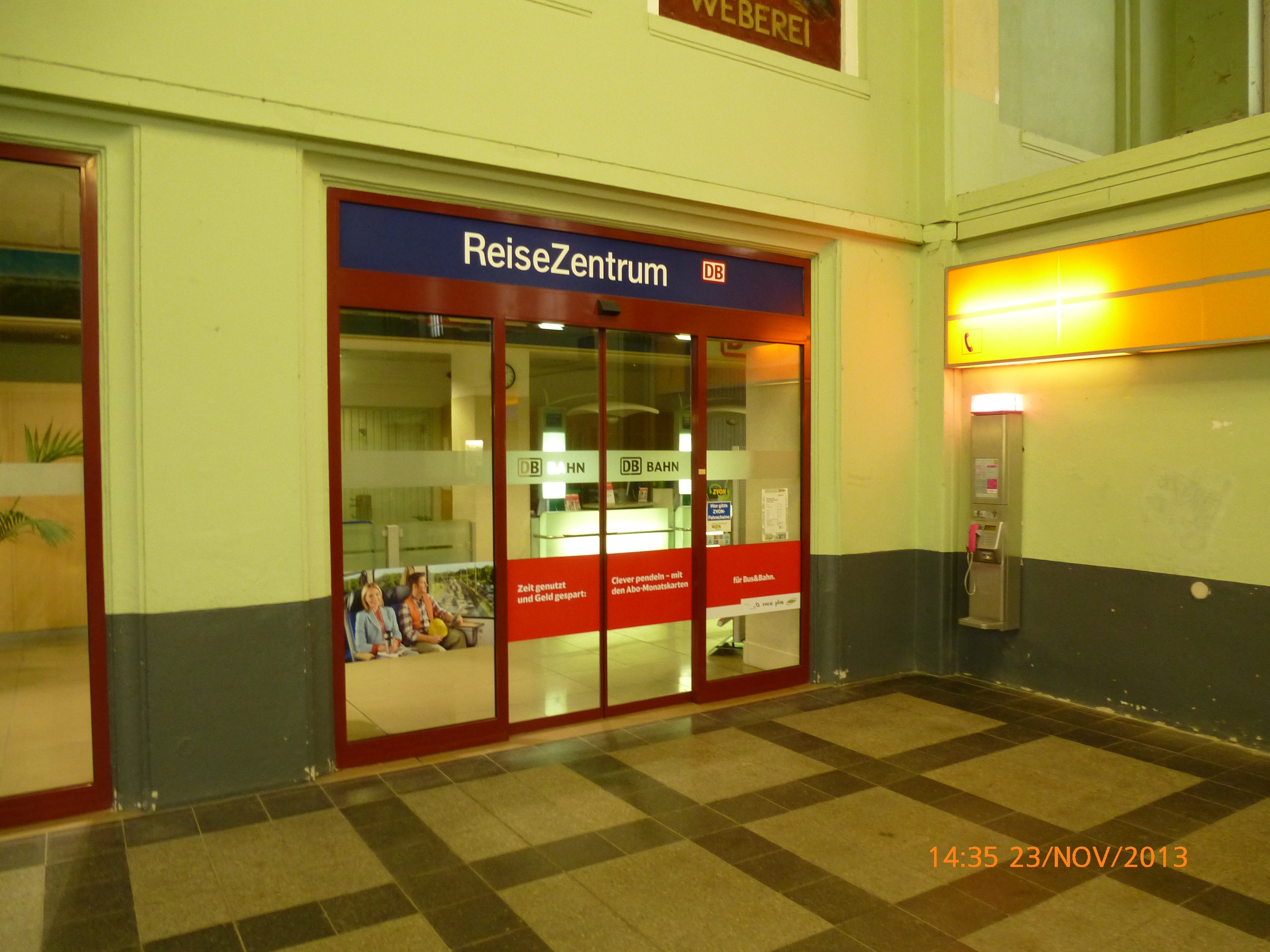
Service centre, 2013

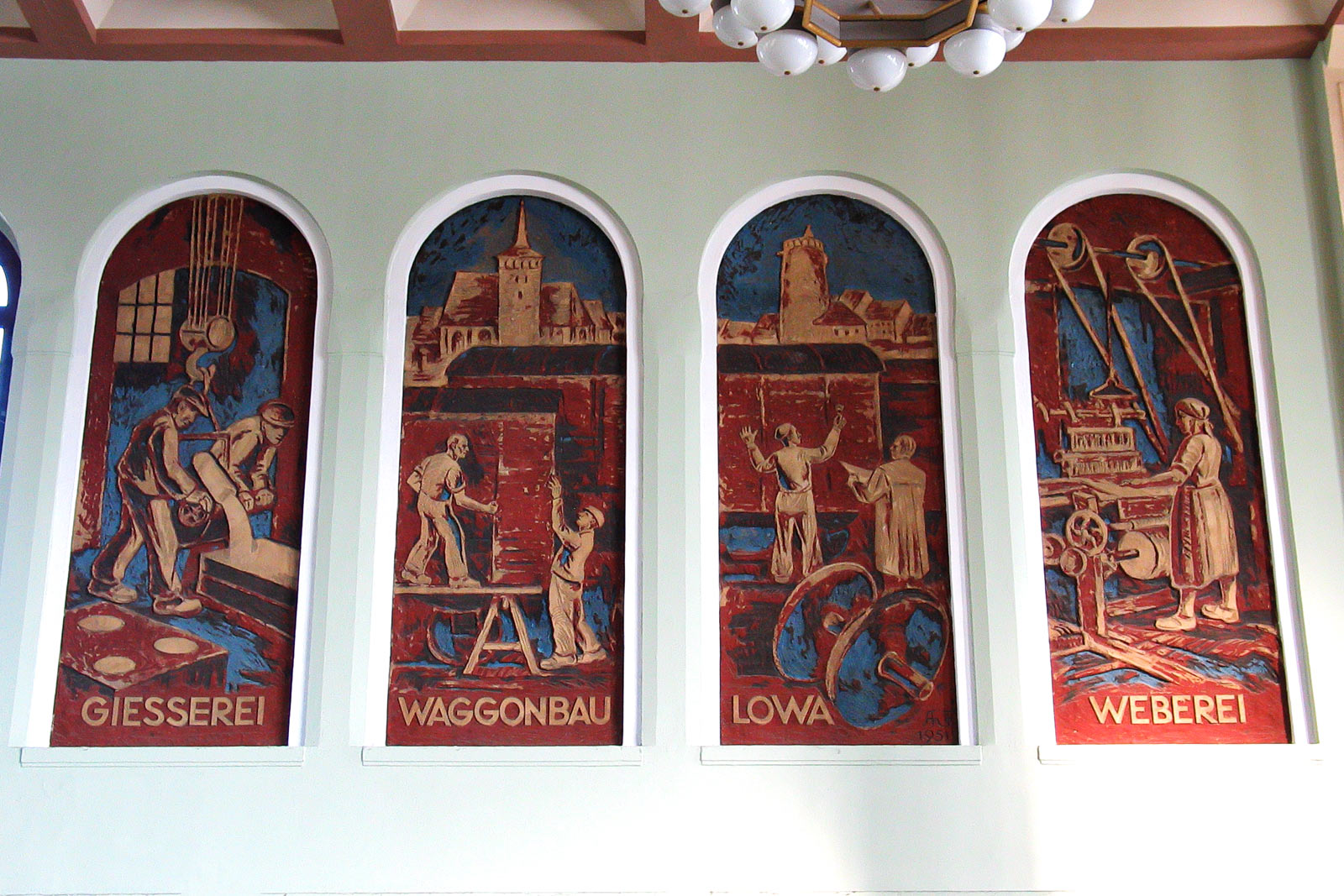
Herzog's sgraffiti, south-east wall

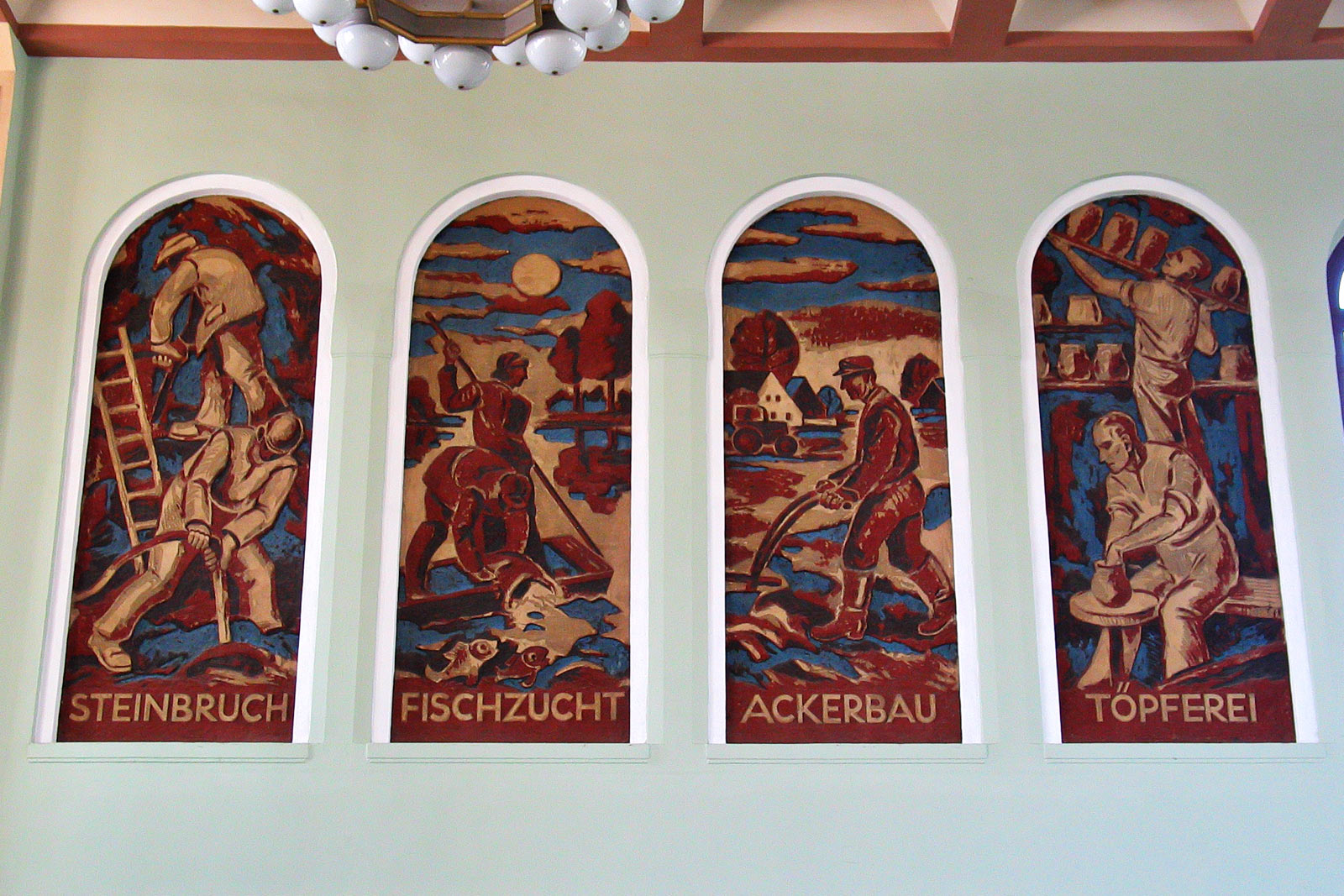
Herzog's sgraffiti, north-west wall

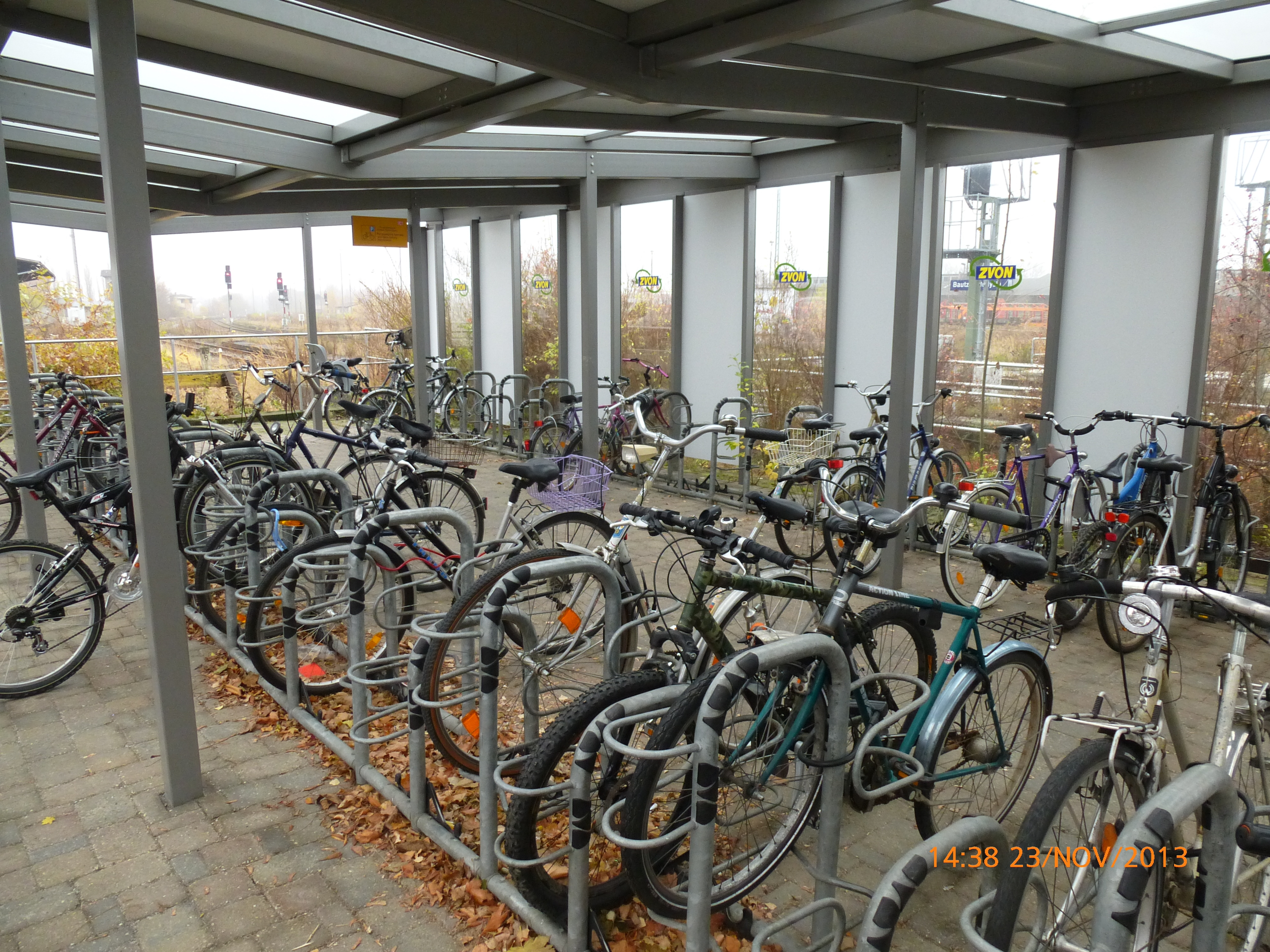
Cycle racks, 2013

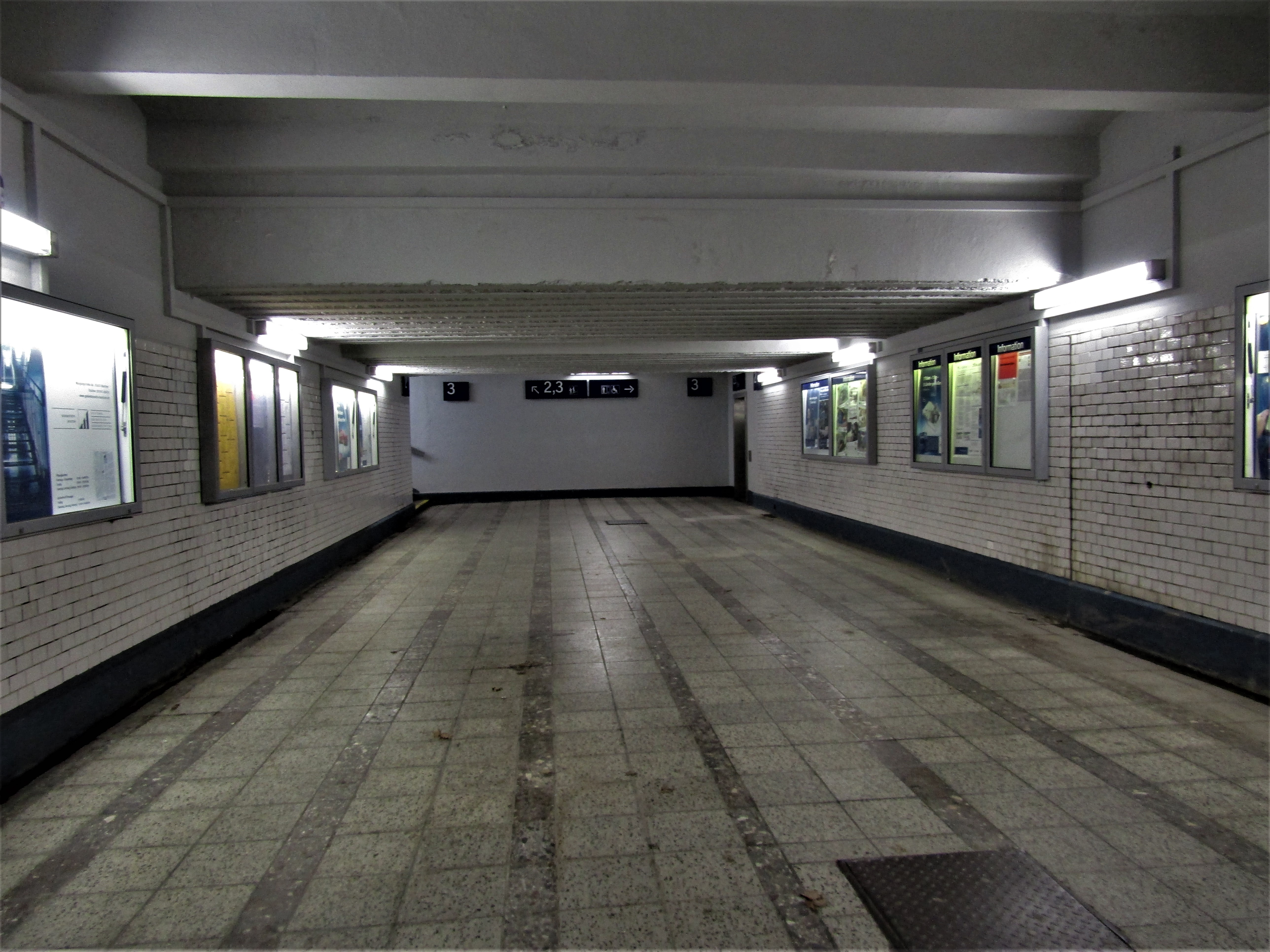
Station subway, 2020

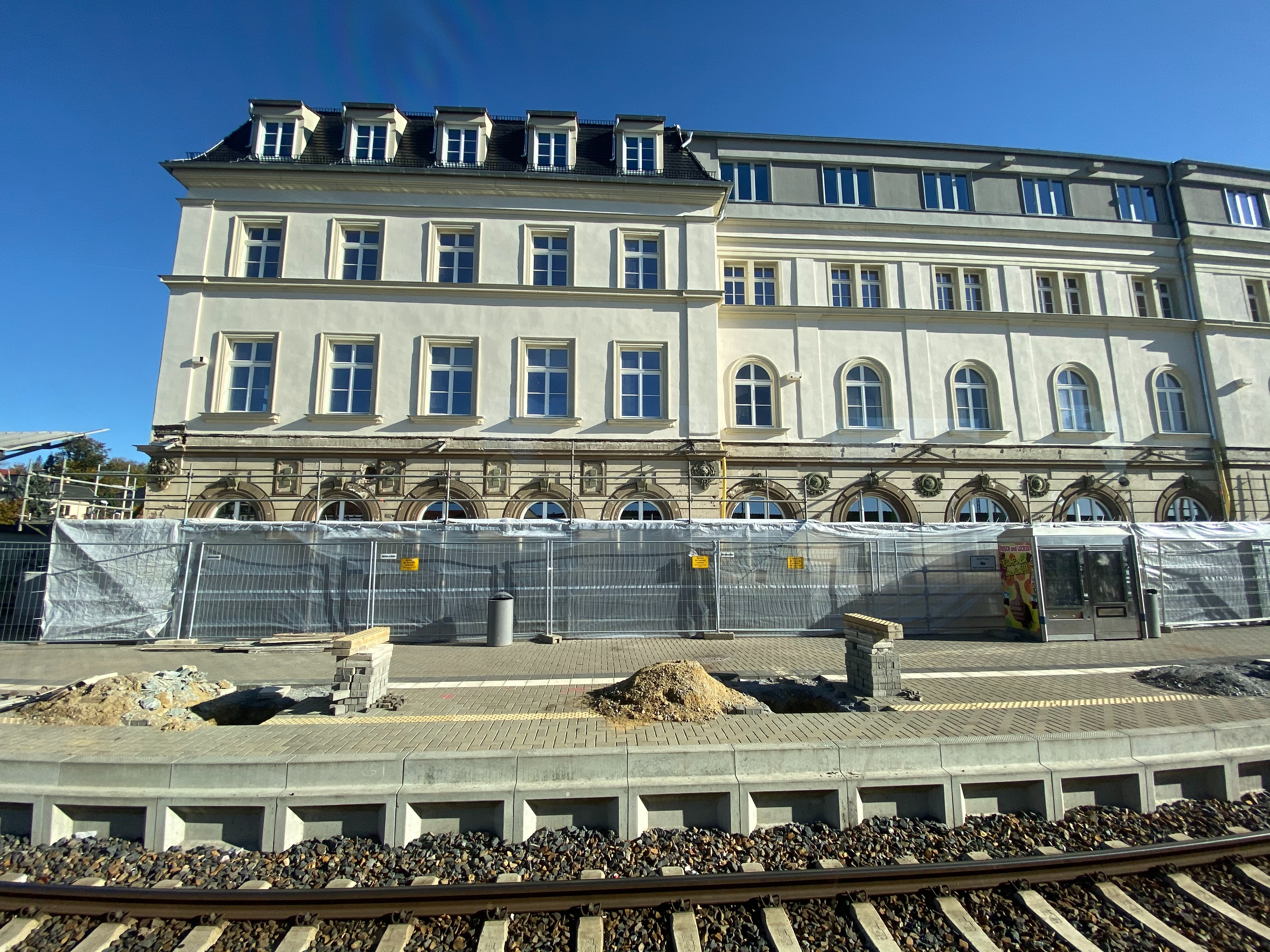
Renovations, 2019

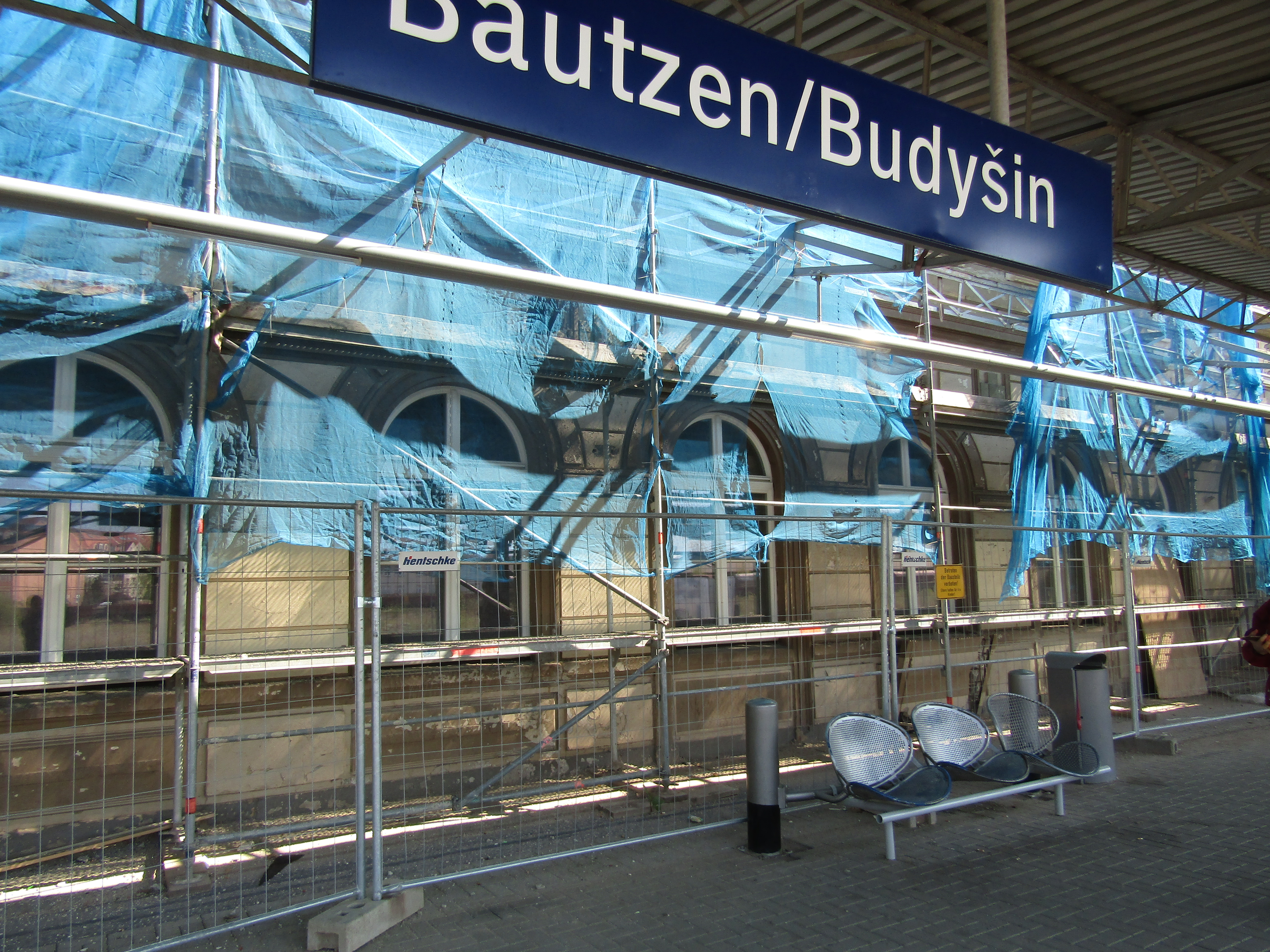
Renovations and bilingual sign, 2019

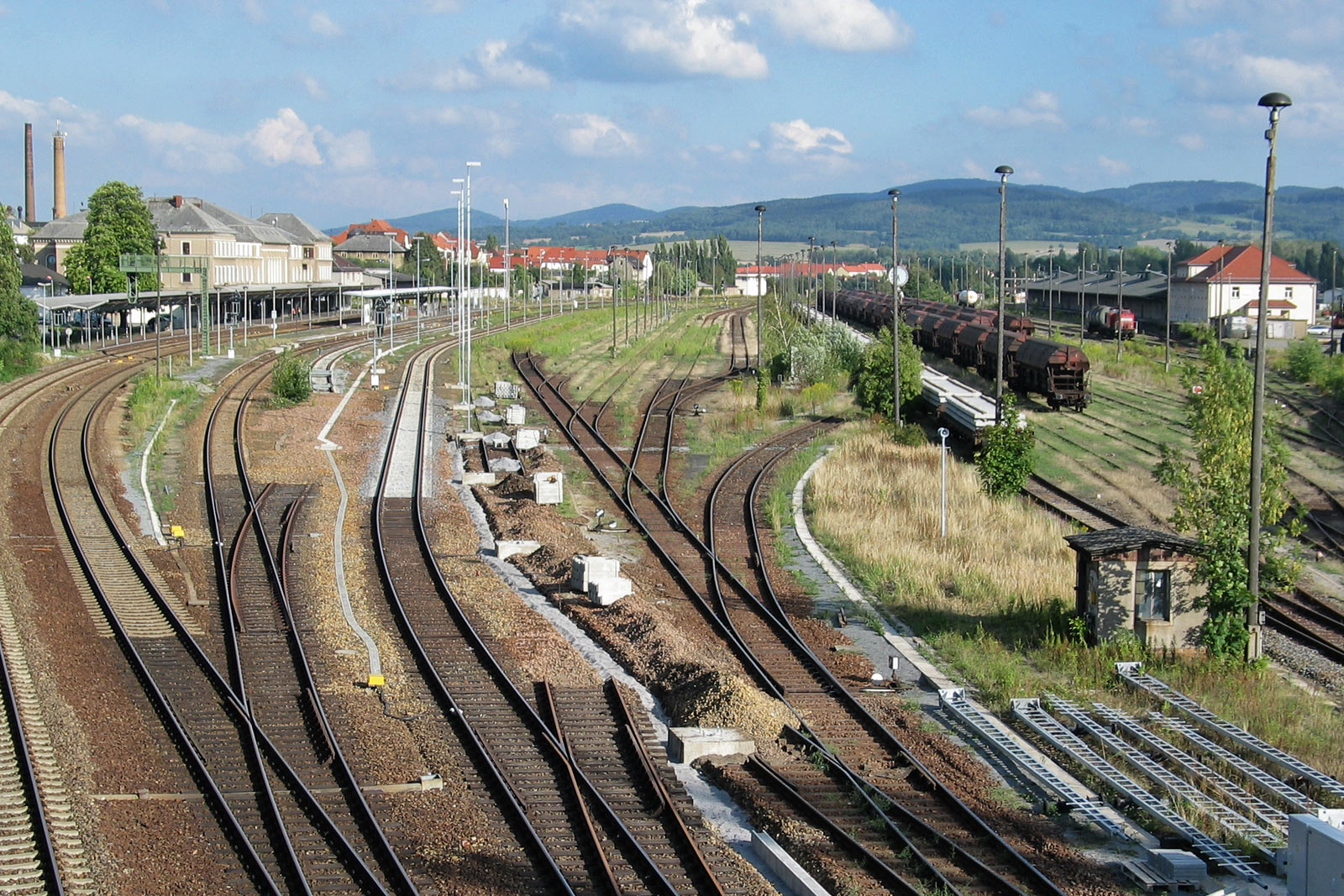
Bautzen station and yards

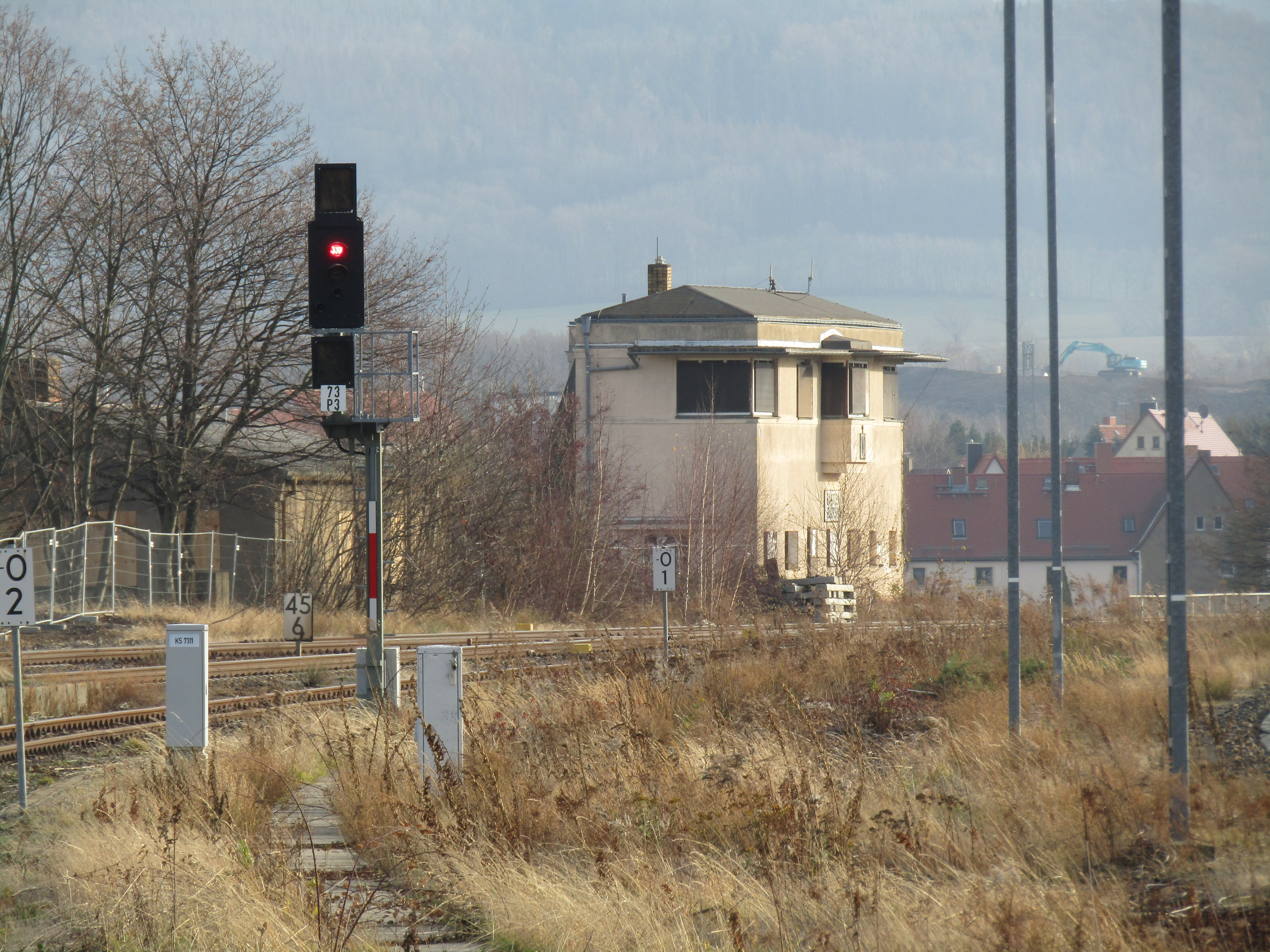
Signal box

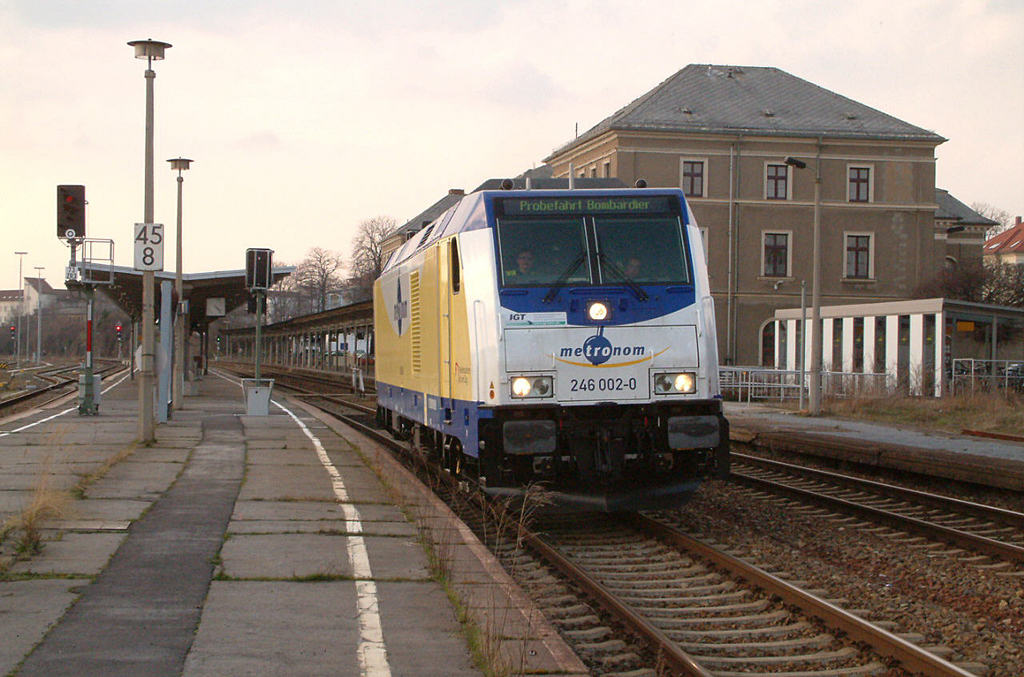
Metronom test run at Bautzen, 2007
