= Sebnitz station =

Railway station in Sebnitz, Germany

Sebnitz
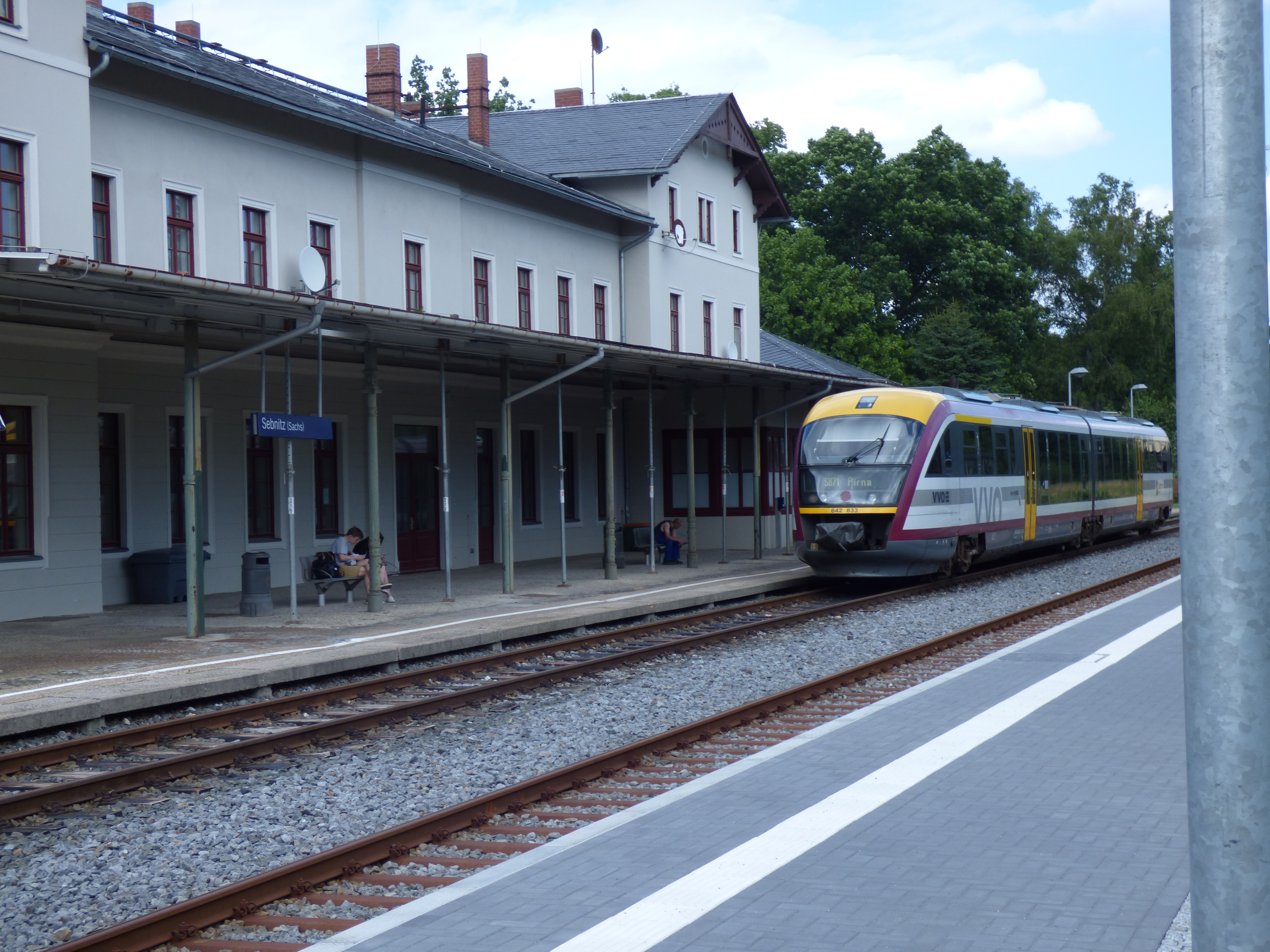
- 2015

General information
- Location: Bahnhofstraße 17; 01855 Sebnitz; Saxony; Germany
- Coordinates: 50°58′31″N 14°16′18″E
- Elevation: 313 m (1,027 ft)
- Owner: DB Netz
- Operator: DB Station&Service
- Lines: Bautzen–Bad Schandau railway (KBS 248); Rumburk–Sebnitz railway
- Platforms: 1 island platform 1 side platform
- Tracks: 3

Other information
- Station code: 5771
- DS100 code: DSEB
- IBNR: 8012959
- Category: 6
- Fare zone: Verkehrsverbund Oberelbe
- Website: www.bahnhof.de

History
- Opened: 1 July 1877; 149 years ago

Services
| Preceding station | DB Regio Südost | Following station |
|---|---|---|
| Krumhermsdorf towards Pirna | RB 71 | Terminus |
| Amtshainersdorf towards Děčín main | U 28 | Dolní Poustevna towards Rumburk |
Location
- Location within Saxony

Sebnitz (German: Bahnhof Sebnitz) is a railway station in the town of Sebnitz, Saxony, Germany. The station lies on the Bautzen–Bad Schandau railway and the Rumburk–Sebnitz railway.

The station is served by DB Regio Südost.

The line into the Czech Republic, to Dolní Poustevna was closed in 1945. In 2012 it was announced that funding had been agreed for the rebuilding and reopening of the line. The new line was opened on 5 July 2014. This work included rebuilding the junction and some hundred metres of track and signalling to the border, from where the track has already been rebuilt.
