= Neukirch/Lausitz =

Neukirch/Lausitz Wjazońca
- Town
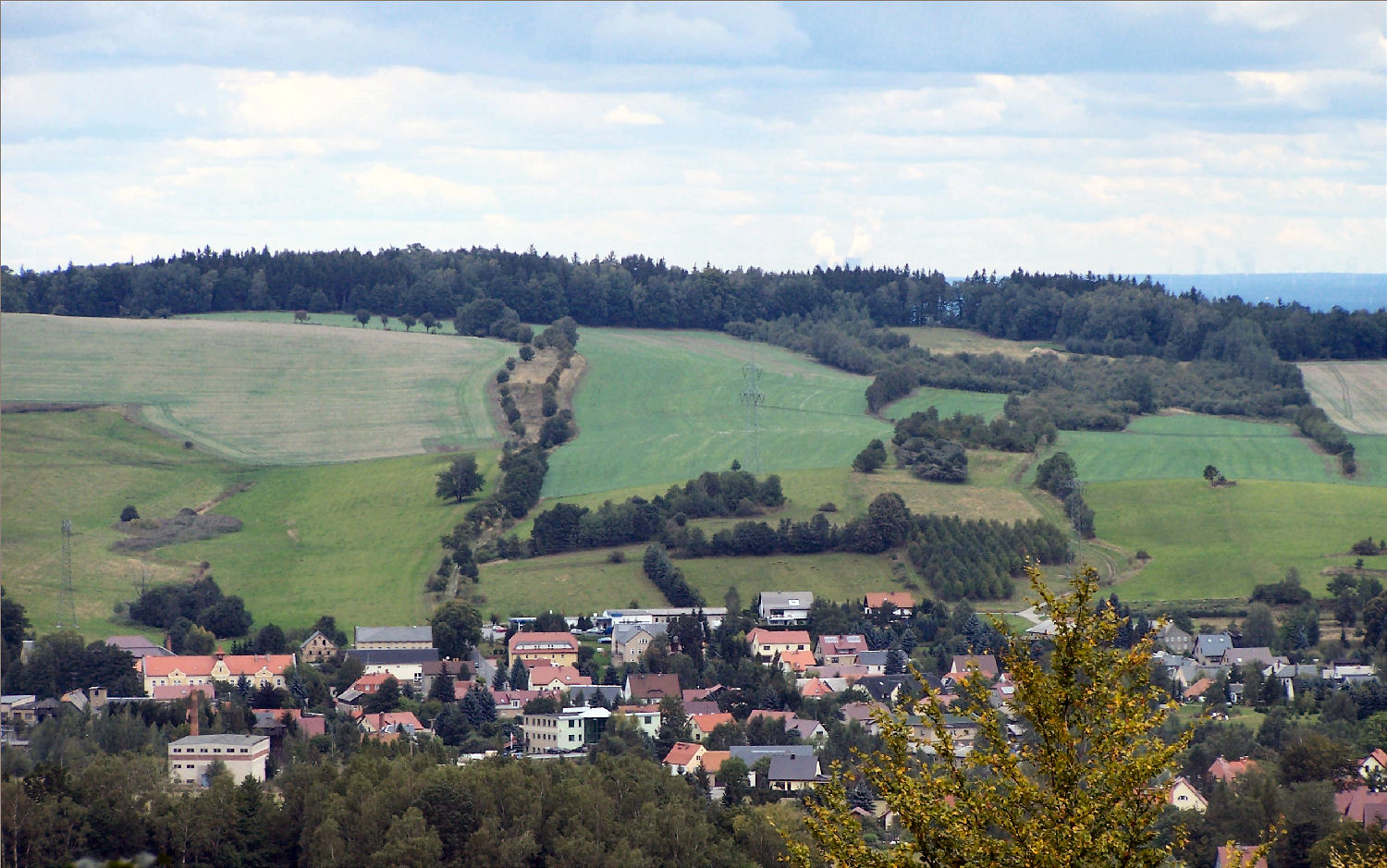

- Location of Neukirch/Lausitz; Wjazońca within Bautzen district
- Interactive map of Neukirch/Lausitz; Wjazońca
- Location within Germany Location within Saxony
- Coordinates: 51°6′N 14°19′E
- Country: Germany
- State: Saxony
- District: Bautzen

Government
  - Mayor (2022–29): Jens Zeiler (CDU)

Area
  - Total: 21.3 km^{2} (8.2 sq mi)
- Elevation: 325 m (1,066 ft)

Population (2025-12-31)
  - Total: 4,714
  - Density: 221/km^{2} (573/sq mi)
- Time zone: UTC+01:00 (CET)
  - Summer (DST): UTC+02:00 (CEST)
- Postal codes: 01904
- Dialling codes: 035951
- Vehicle registration: BZ, BIW, HY, KM
- Website: www.neukirch-lausitz.de

Neukirch/Lausitz (German, pronounced [ˈnɔʏkɪʁç]) or Wjazońca (Upper Sorbian, pronounced [ˈwʲazɔnʲtsa]) is a municipality in Upper Lusatia in the district of Bautzen, in the state of Saxony in eastern Germany. It belongs to the district of Bautzen and is situated in several valleys of the mountain region Lausitzer Bergland, near the hill "Valtenberg" that reaches about 587 metres. It has about 5,066 inhabitants (December 2015) in an area of 21.32 km², a population density of 240 per km². The German name Lausitz means Lusatia.

== Geography and history ==
At the Valtenberg there is the source of the river Wesenitz. Nearby communities are Doberschau-Gaußig, Wilthen, Steinigtwolmsdorf and Schmölln-Putzkau in the district of Bautzen and Hohwald in the district of Saxon Switzerland The distance to the biggest towns of the region is 15 km to Bautzen and 12 km to the city of Bischofswerda.

Neukirch was first mentioned in writing in 1222. The Battle of Bautzen in 1813 between the French and the Russian army took place nearby.
