= Hohwald =

Municipality in Saxony, Germany

Coordinates: 51.050°N 14.233°E

Hohwald was a municipality in the Sächsische Schweiz district, in Saxony, Germany. It consisted of Berthelsdorf, Langburkersdorf, Niederottendorf, Oberottendorf, Rückersdorf and Rugiswalde.

== History ==
The municipality was created on 1 January 1994 through the merger of three former municipalities Berthelsdorf, Langburkersdorf and Rückersdorf. The name was taken from the forest area Hohwald which is located north-east of the municipal territory. On 1 August 2007 it became part of Neustadt in Sachsen, after the residents decided on the 13 May 2007 to join the larger town.
