= Neustadt in Sachsen =

- Town
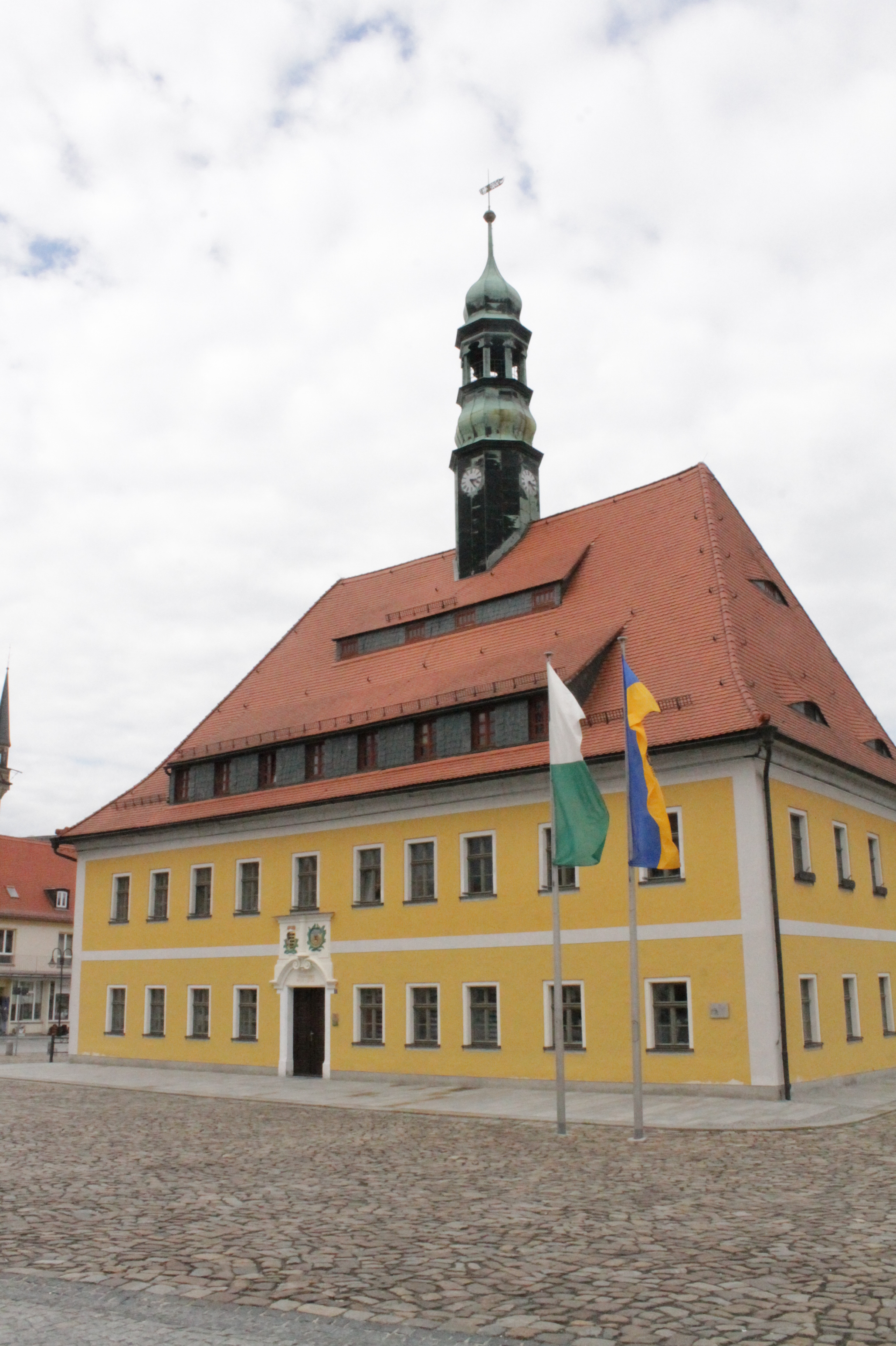

- Coat of arms

- Location of Neustadt in Sachsen within Sächsische Schweiz-Osterzgebirge district
- Interactive map of Neustadt in Sachsen
- Location within Germany Location within Saxony
- Coordinates: 51°01′26″N 14°13′00″E
- Country: Germany
- State: Saxony
- District: Sächsische Schweiz-Osterzgebirge

Government
  - Mayor (2022–29): Peter Mühle

Area
  - Total: 83.12 km^{2} (32.09 sq mi)
- Elevation: 340 m (1,120 ft)

Population (2025-12-31)
  - Total: 11,740
  - Density: 141.2/km^{2} (365.8/sq mi)
- Time zone: UTC+01:00 (CET)
  - Summer (DST): UTC+02:00 (CEST)
- Postal codes: 01841–01844
- Dialling codes: 03596
- Vehicle registration: PIR
- Website: www.neustadt-sachsen.de

Neustadt in Sachsen (German pronunciation: [ˈnɔʏʃtat ʔɪn ˈzaksn̩]) is a town in the Sächsische Schweiz-Osterzgebirge district, in Saxony, Germany. It is situated near the border with the Czech Republic, 35 km east of Dresden (centre), and 23 km southwest of Bautzen. At Neustadt, there is an Observation Tower at Goetzinger's Height, one of the oldest lattice towers in the world.

On August 1, 2007 the villages Berthelsdorf, Langburkersdorf, Niederottendorf, Oberottendorf, Rückersdorf and Rugiswalde of the former municipality Hohwald were integrated into the town.

== Buildings of Interest ==
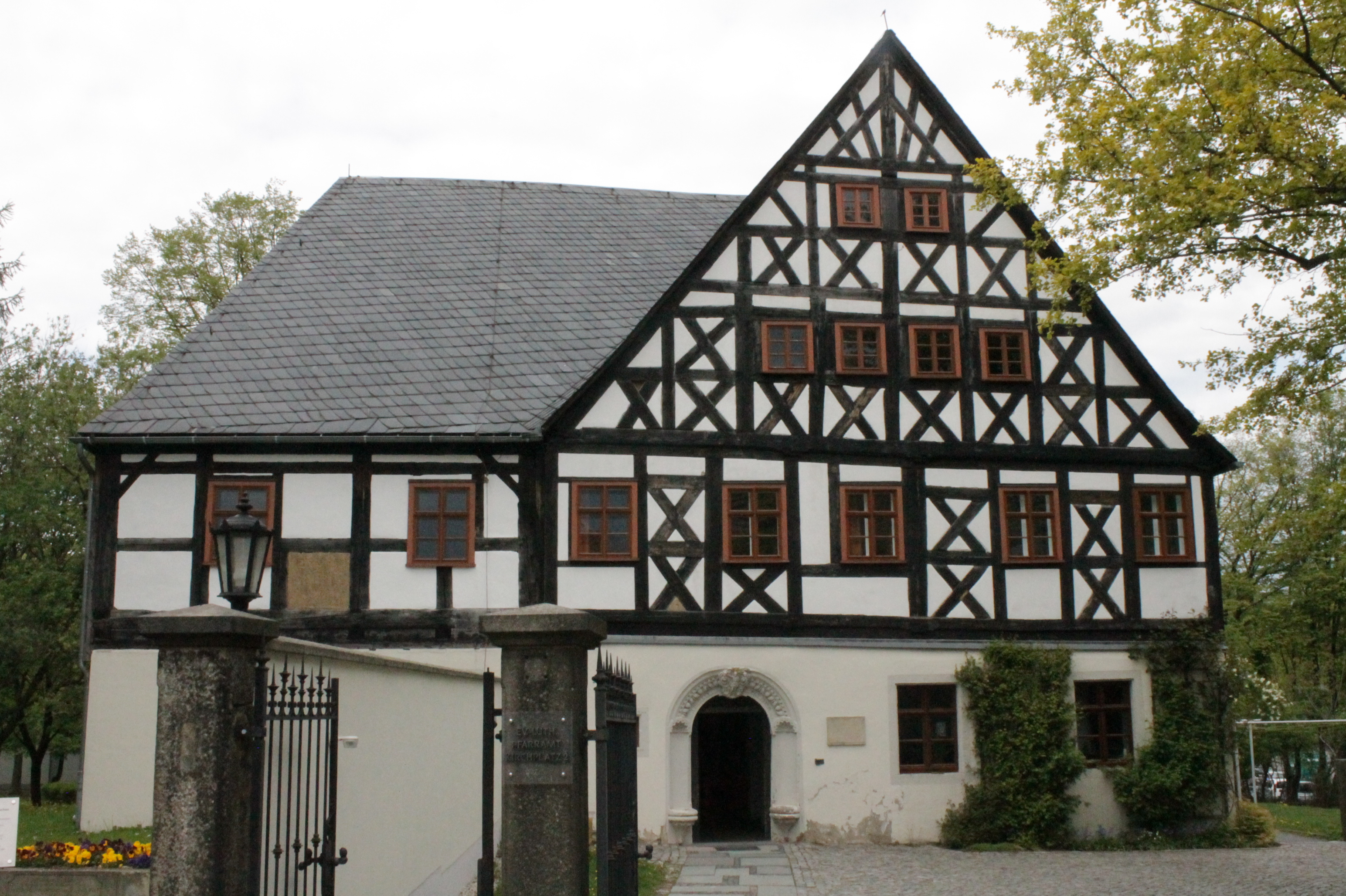
The 1616 vicarage, Neustadt in Saxony

- Town hall (c.1700)
- Vicarage (1616)
- St Jacob's Church (rebuilt 1884)
