= Kirnitzschtal tramway =

Tramway in Saxony, Germany

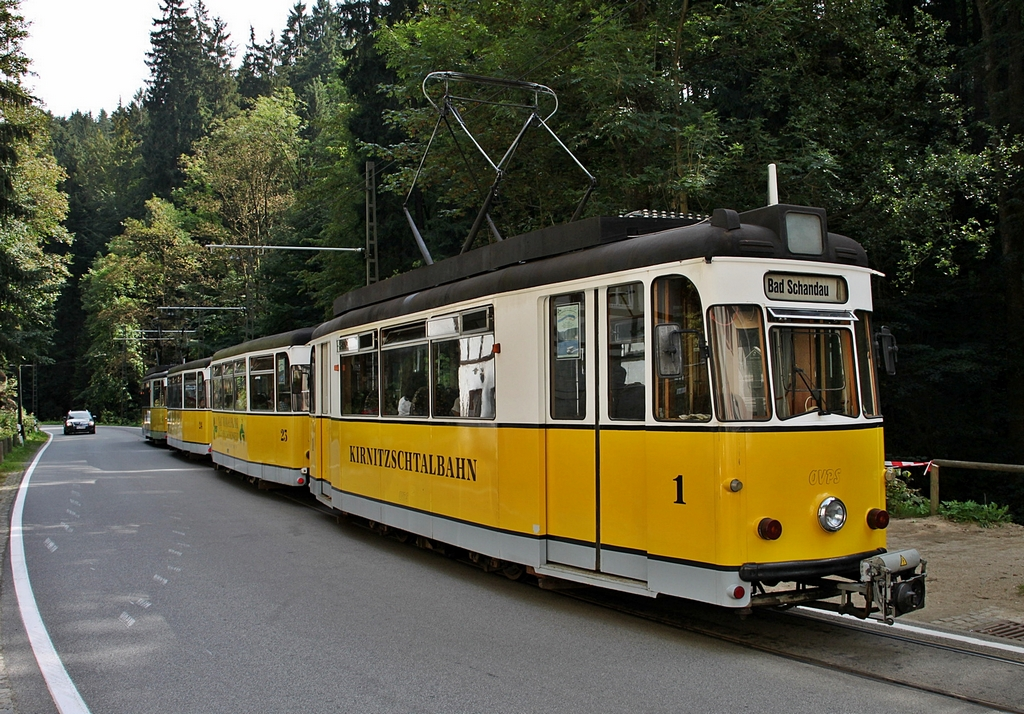
- Cars at the Beuthenfall stop

Overview
- Status: Operational
- Owner: RVSOE
- Locale: Saxony, Germany
- Termini: Bad Schandau; Lichtenhain Waterfall
- Stations: 9 including 2 termini

Service
- Type: Electric tramway
- Operator: RVSOE

History
- Opened: 1898

Technical
- Line length: 7.9 km (4.9 mi)
- Num of tracks: Single track with passing loops
- Track gauge: 1,000 mm (3 ft 3 3/8 in) metre gauge
- Electrification: 600 V DC overhead line
Route map

The Kirnitzschtal tramway, also known as the Kirnitzschtalbahn, is an electric tramway in Saxony, Germany. The line runs through the valley of the Kirnitzsch river in Saxon Switzerland, from the town of Bad Schandau up to the Lichtenhain Waterfall, in the municipality of Sebnitz. The line is principally a tourist service, being the only tramway to serve a National Park in Germany, and uses historical rolling stock built between 1925 and 1968.

The line is operated by the Regionalverkehr Sächsische Schweiz-Osterzgebirge GmbH (RVSOE). This company also operates local and regional bus services in Saxon Switzerland and the adjoining Osterzgebirge (Eastern Ore Mountains), together with boat services on the Elbe river.

== History ==
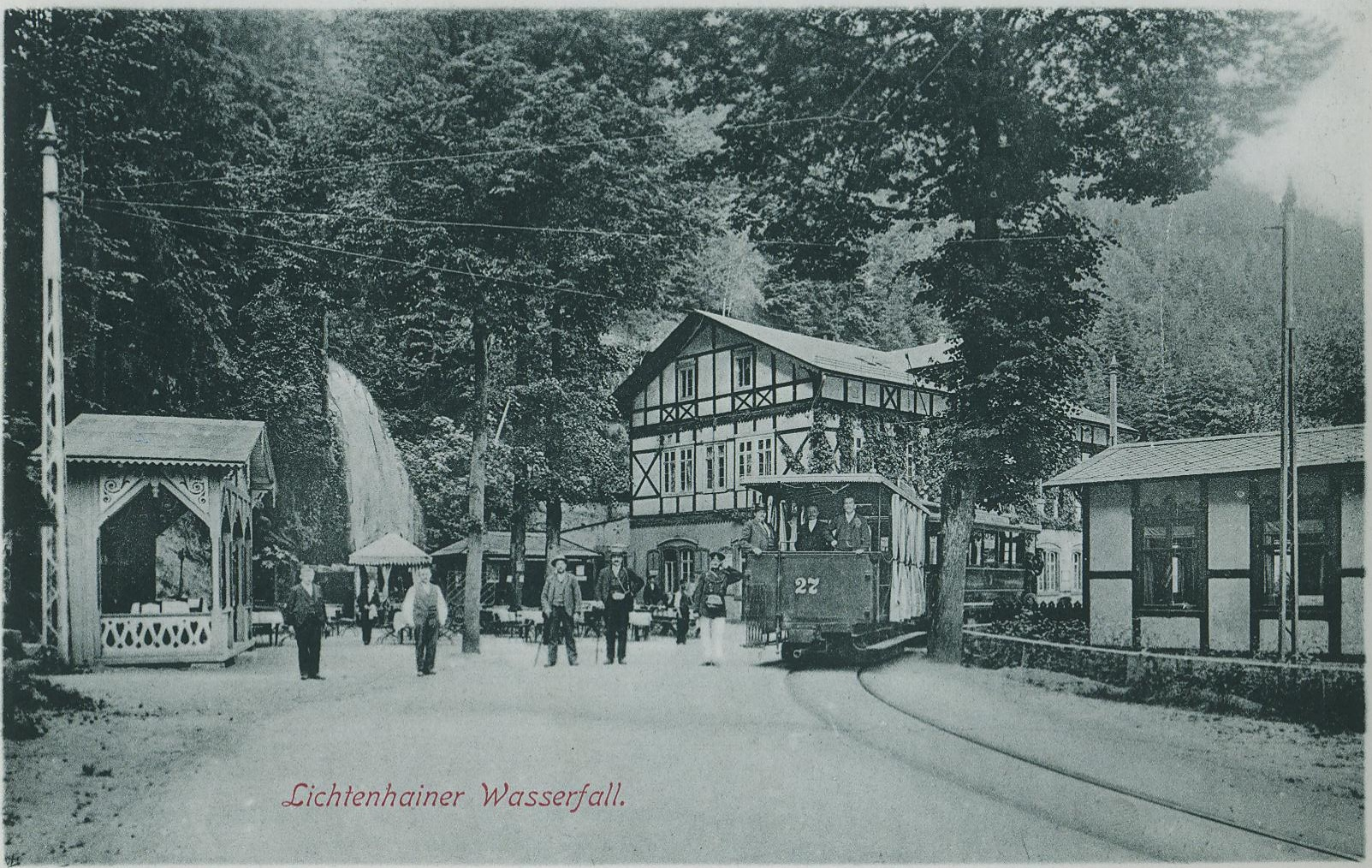
The last stop, at the Lichtenhain Waterfall, around 1910.

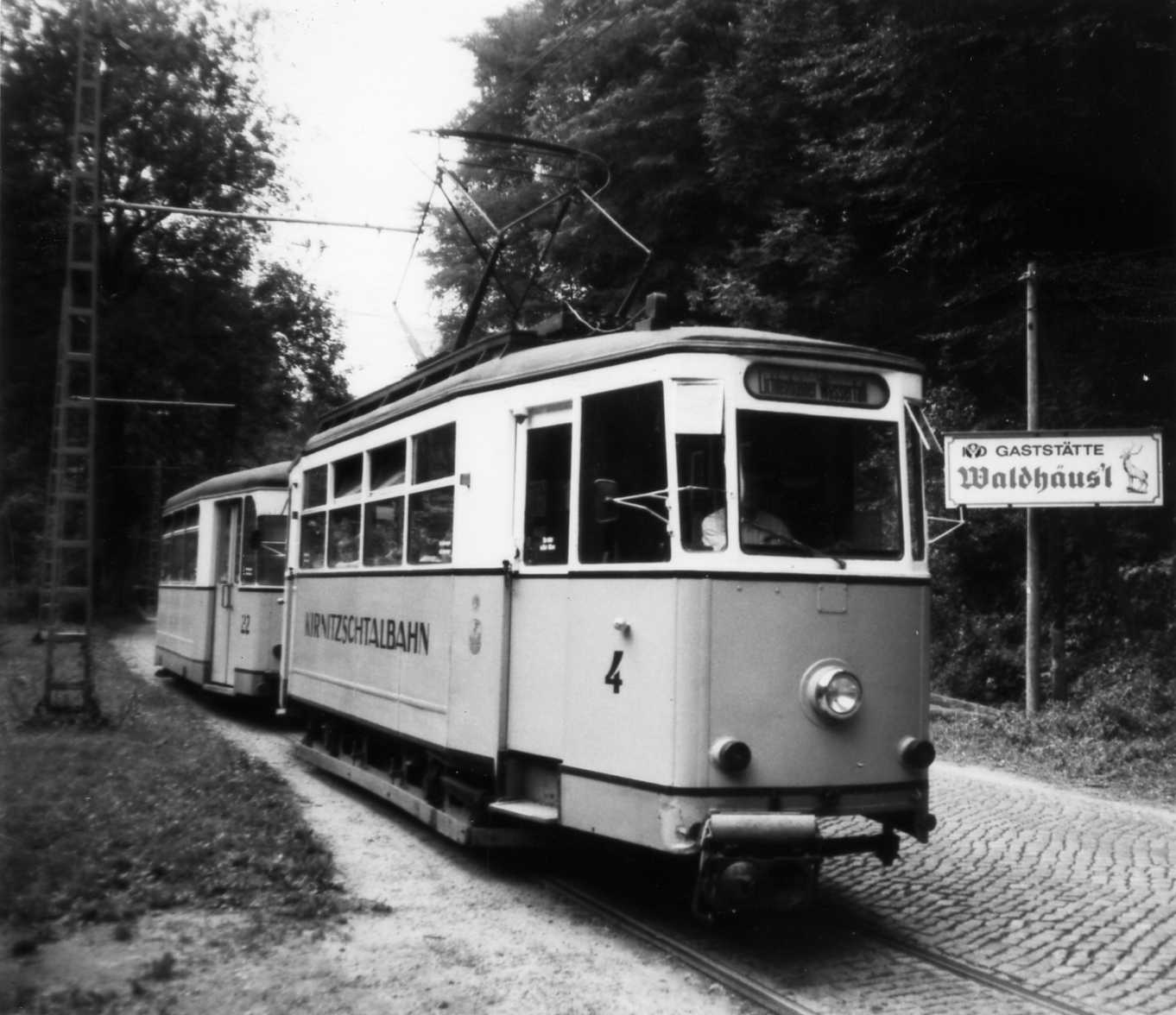
The tramway in 1992

The first plans for the line were introduced in 1893. These were for a tramway from Bad Schandau to Kirnitzschschänke (now Zadní Jetřichovice in the Czech Republic). The decision on the form of propulsion to use was controversial, with both steam locomotives and electric traction proposed. However steam propulsion proved uneconomic, and electrification was chosen, requiring the construction of a power plant. The line opened from Bad Schandau as far as the Lichtenhain Waterfall on Saturday 28 May 1898. The remainder of the line, to Kirnitzschschänke, was never built for economic reasons, and service was initially limited to the summer months. The initial vehicle fleet comprised six enclosed motorcars and six open trailers, which were built by Busch in Bautzen.

In 1926, the overhead electricity supply was completely renewed, the existing cars were modernised and two new cars were purchased from Waggonbau Görlitz. However, during the night of 26 July 1927, fire destroyed the depot and the entire fleet. Service was restored on August 12 and continued until October 31 using cars borrowed from the Lößnitz Tramway. In 1928, a new fleet of five motorcars and six trailers built by MAN were put into service and the Lößnitz Tramway cars were returned to Radebeul. However a maintenance car from the Lößnitz Tramway remained on the Kirnitzschtal tramway until 1954, over 20 years after the other borrowed cars had been scrapped. It was transferred to the Lockwitztal tramway, where it remained in regular transport service until 1968.

In 1938, the line finally started running during the winter months. It largely escaped any damage during the Second World War and operation resumed on 7 June 1945, but by the end of the 1960s the line was in increasingly poor condition, with several derailments. On 23 June 1969, the line was truncated by approximately 350 metres (1,150 ft) at the Bad Schandau end, because of increasing traffic congestion in the town. The former terminus at the Hotel Lindenhof and the stop at Forellenbrücke were replaced by a new terminus at Stadtpark, now Kurpark. A month later, on 21 July, one of the line's motor cars overturned and all of the passengers suffered injuries. As a result, the authorities ordered the closure of line, and its long-term future was in doubt.

In December 1969, after some debate, the city council decided to retain the line, a decision that was endorsed by the district council of Dresden in March. However the necessary reconstruction of the track was delayed and it was not until 25 July 1972 that the line reopened. Even then the reopened section only stretched as far as the Nasser Grund stop, and Lichtenhainer Wasserfall was not reached until 24 May 1973. As a further modernisation move, the line took over five motorcars from the Lockwitztal tramway in 1977, after the closure of that line. These vehicles were built between 1938 and 1944 for the Erfurt tramway, and are thus called Erfurter. They replaced the MAN motor cars of 1928, but the trailers from that era were retained to run with the new motorcars.

In 1984, four trailers built by Gothaer Waggonfabrik in the 1960s were acquired, and two of them were placed into service. However at the end of 1985 poor track condition forced another closure of the line, and again the line's future was in doubt. Public pressure led to a decision to retain the line, and after reconstruction of 650 metres (2,130 ft) of track, the section between Waldhäusel and Lichtenhainer Wasserfall stops reopened on 18 August 1986, with a replacement bus operating between Bad Schandau and Waldhäusel. The following year the remaining two trailers acquired in 1984 were brought into service. The line into Bad Schandau reopened as far as Botanischer Garten stop in 1989 and to the Kurpark terminus on 3 August 1990.

In 1992, the line acquired two motor cars similar to the trailers acquired in 1984. A further two motor cars and two trailers were acquired in 1995 and a final motor car in 2007. These vehicles came from various East German cities, and, along with the trailers acquired in 1984 are collectively known as Gothawagen. Their arrival allowed the retirement of the remaining Erfurter motor cars and MAN trailers. Between October 1993 and May 1994, the line underwent extensive construction work, including rebuilds of the depot and the Lichtenhainer Wasserfall stop.

The very serious flooding of the Elbe in 2002 caused service to be suspended, as the line's Bad Schandau terminus, along with the rest of the town, was under 1 metre (3 ft 3 in) of flood water. Reconstruction of the Kirnitzschtal road, together with extensive track replacement, again caused suspension in 2003. On 7 August 2010, heavy flooding in the Kirnitz Valley caused damage to both the line and its vehicles. The depot was flooded as high as the tram floors, causing damage to the cars' motors, gears and axles. The line did not operate again until Easter 2011, and when it reopened it was curtailed to Beuthenfall as a retaining wall on the approach to the Lichtenhain Waterfall terminus had to be rebuilt. This last section did not reopen until December 2012. Further flooding by the Kirnitzsch river in July 2021 resulted in the line having to be closed for a week whilst the resulting debris was removed.

As of 1 January 2019, the Oberelbische Verkehrsgesellschaft Pirna Sebnitz mbH (OVPS), which had previously operated the line, became part of the Regionalverkehr Sächsische Schweiz-Osterzgebirge GmbH (RVSOE), which now operates the tramway.

== Operation ==
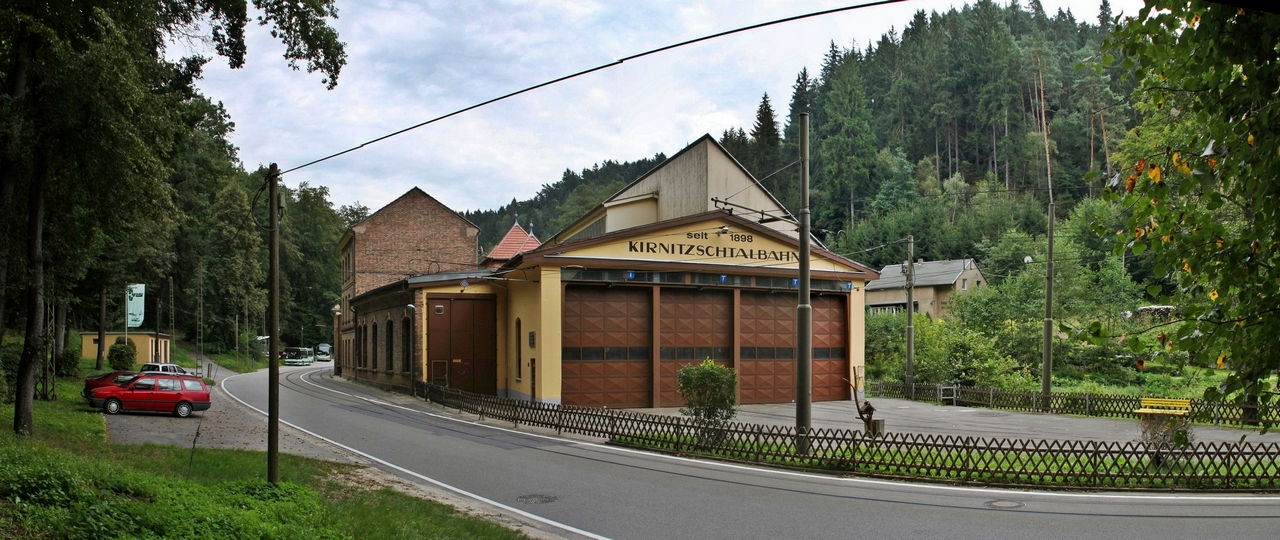
The depot of the Kirnitzschtal Tramway.

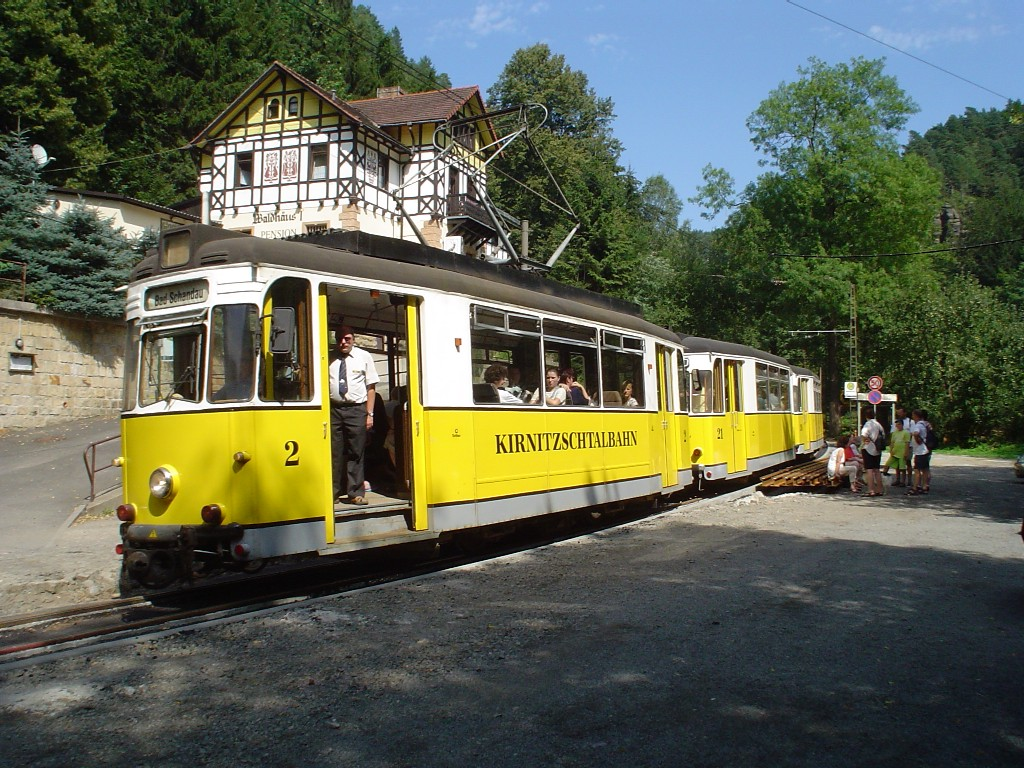
Car 2 at the Forsthaus stop, close to the village of Mittelndorf.

The line is 7.9 kilometres (4.9 mi) long, of metre gauge, electrified at 600 volts DC on the overhead line system, and uses four-wheeled motor coaches and trailers. It has seven stopping points in addition to the two termini. The single track line has two passing loops, one at the depot and the other between the Forsthaus and Nasser Grund stops. There are also loops at both termini, to enable the motorcars to run around their trailers.

Principally a tourist service, the line transports passengers to the waterfall and to a number of access points for hiking, including along the Malerweg or Painters' Way. Adjacent to its waterfall terminus is the half-timbered Lichtenhainer Wasserfall hotel, which has been described by The Guardian as "delightfully kitsch".

The line is unusual in that it is mostly "gutter running", a type of track layout once common on rural tramways in Germany. In this tramway, the track is laid in the southern, eastbound, lane of the S165 Kirnitzschtalstrasse road. Thus westbound trams heading towards Bad Schandau travel against the normal flow of road traffic, requiring heightened attention from both tram and road vehicle drivers. Although some of the line's tramcars are double-ended, only the doors on the south side are used, as all the stops are on the south side of the road.

As of 2022, the line operates throughout the year. In the winter months it operates every 70 minutes, whilst in the summer months it operates every half hour. The winter timetable is typically operated by a single Gothawagen motor car operating on its own, whilst the summer timetable requires three such motor cars, each pulling one or two matching trailers. Additional public trips are operated on some days using the line's older rolling stock, which is also available for private charter.

In the 1990s the line installed solar cells on the roof for the depot, which contribute about 20% of the electricity used by the system.

Although RVSOE is a member of the Verkehrsverbund Oberelbe (VVO), that organisation's common fare structure does not apply to the Kirnitzschtal Tramway, reflecting its predominantly tourist nature. The line is paralleled throughout by OVPS bus route 241, which accepts VVO fares. On the parallel stretch, bus service varies from half-hourly, on summer weekends, to a few journeys a day, on winter weekdays.

== Rolling stock ==
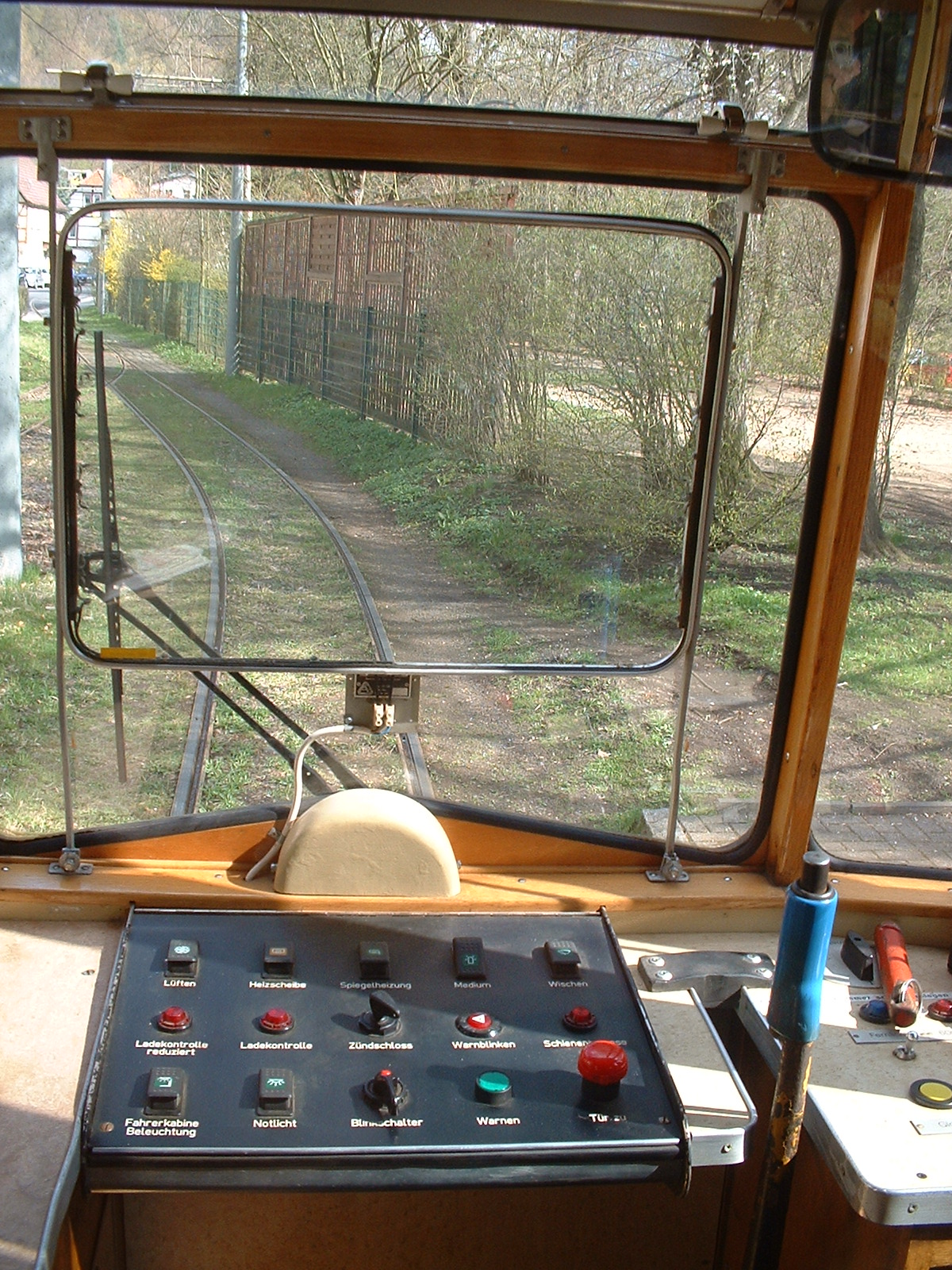
View into the driving cab of a tram

Image	Numbers	Type	Date	Notes
	1-4,6	Gothawagen motor car	1957-1960	Acquired from various East German tram systems at various times. Cars 1-2 were acquired from the Plauen tramway in 1992, 3 from Plauen in 1995, 4 from the Zwickau tramway in 1995 and 6 from the Jena tramway via Radeburg in 2007. These cars, together with matching trailers 21 to 26, provide the main service on the line.
	5	MAN motor car	1928	Built for the Kirnitzschtal tramway as one of the class of motor cars that provided the main service on the line from 1928 to the 1970s, when they were replaced by Erfurter motor cars. Car 5 was finally retired on 31 March 1979, but was restored to working condition on 28 May 1983 to celebrate the line's 85th anniversary, and is now used for special services.
	8	Erfurter motor car	1938	Built for use on the Erfurt tramway, where it was used until 1968. It was then acquired and rebuilt for use on the Lockwitztal tramway. When that line closed in 1977, car 8 and four other ex-Erfurt cars were acquired by the Kirnitzschtal line, where they provided the main motor car service until replaced by Gothawagen motor cars in the 1990s. The only Erfurter car still on the Kirnitzschtal line, it is now used for special services.
	9	Bautzen motor car	1925	Built for use on the Lockwitztal tramway. The car was restored in 1976 for the 70th anniversary of the Lockwitztal line, but after the line closed the following year it was slated for scrapping. At the last minute this was avoided and the car was transferred to the Kirnitzschtal in 1979. It is now used for special services.
	12	MAN trailer	1928	Built for the Kirnitzschtal tramway as one of the class of trailers that provided the main service on the line from 1928 to the 1980s, when they were replaced by Gothawagen trailers. Car 12 was restored to working order in 1991, and is now used for special services hauled by matching motor car 5.
	21-26	Gothawagen trailer	1963-1968	Cars 21-24 were acquired and rebuilt in 1984 using bodies from the standard gauge Leipzig tramway married with metre gauge trucks from the Halle tramway. Cars 25-26 were acquired from Zwickau in 1995. These cars, hauled by matching motor cars 1 to 4 and 6, provide the main service on the line.

== Media ==
During 2008, motor car 5 and trailer 12 were used in the filming of The Reader, based on Bernhard Schlink's novel of the same name. Filming took place both on the Görlitz tramway and on the Kirnitzschtal line. During filming on the Kirnitzschtal line, the actress Kate Winslet acted as the conductress of the tram set.

== Bibliography ==
1. Mißbach, Helmut K. (2004). Sächsische Überlandstraßenbahnen seit 1898 (in German). Stuttgart: Transpress Verlag. ISBN 3-613-71243-1.
