= Oberelbische Verkehrsgesellschaft Pirna-Sebnitz =

Oberelbische Verkehrsgesellschaft Pirna-Sebnitz mbH
- Headquarters: Pirna, Germany
- Owner: Landkreis Sächsische Schweiz
- Website: ovps.de

The Oberelbische Verkehrsgesellschaft Pirna-Sebnitz (OVPS; English: Pirna-Sebnitz Upper Elbe Transport Company) was a company that operated public transport services in the German state of Saxony. It was a member of the Verkehrsverbund Oberelbe (Upper Elbe Transport Association), a transport association that manages a common public transport structure for Dresden and its surrounding areas.

The OVPS's area of operations included large parts of the district of Sächsische Schweiz-Osterzgebirge as well as stubs extending into the state capital city of Dresden and the district of Bautzen. This area is often described as Saxon Switzerland.

The services of the OVPS included:

- Urban bus services in the town of Pirna
- Urban bus services in the town of Sebnitz
- Regional bus services in the surrounding areas
- Ferry services on the River Elbe
- The Kirnitzschtal Tramway, a tourist-oriented rural tram service

On January 1, 2017, OVPS took over DB Regio's shares in Regionalverkehr Dresden GmbH (RVD), leaving RVD owned 51% owned by OVPS and 49% owned by the Saxon Switzerland-Eastern Ore Mountains district. As of January 1, 2019, the two companies were merged to form the Regionalverkehr Sächsische Schweiz-Osterzgebirge GmbH (RVSOE).

== Gallery ==
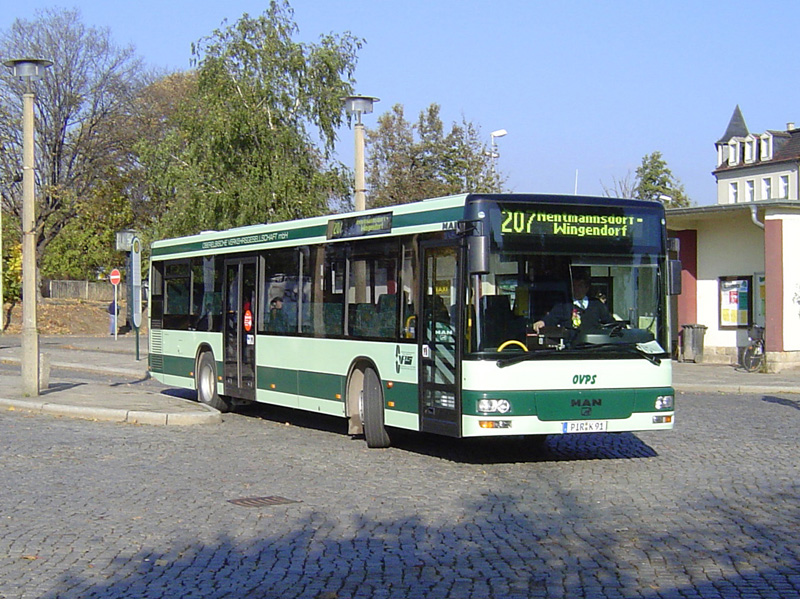
OVPS bus

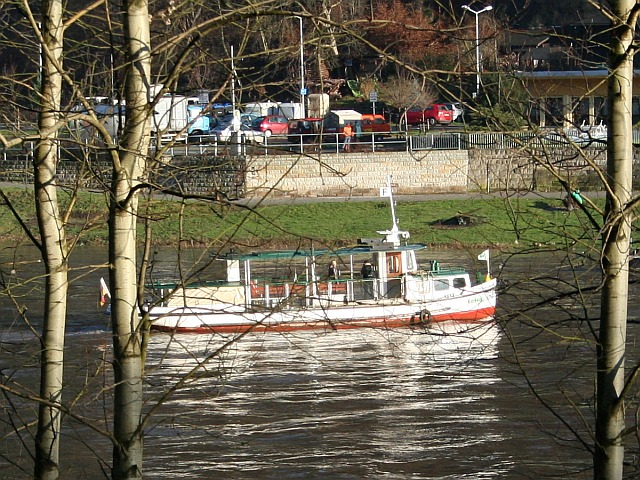
OVPS ferry in Schmilka

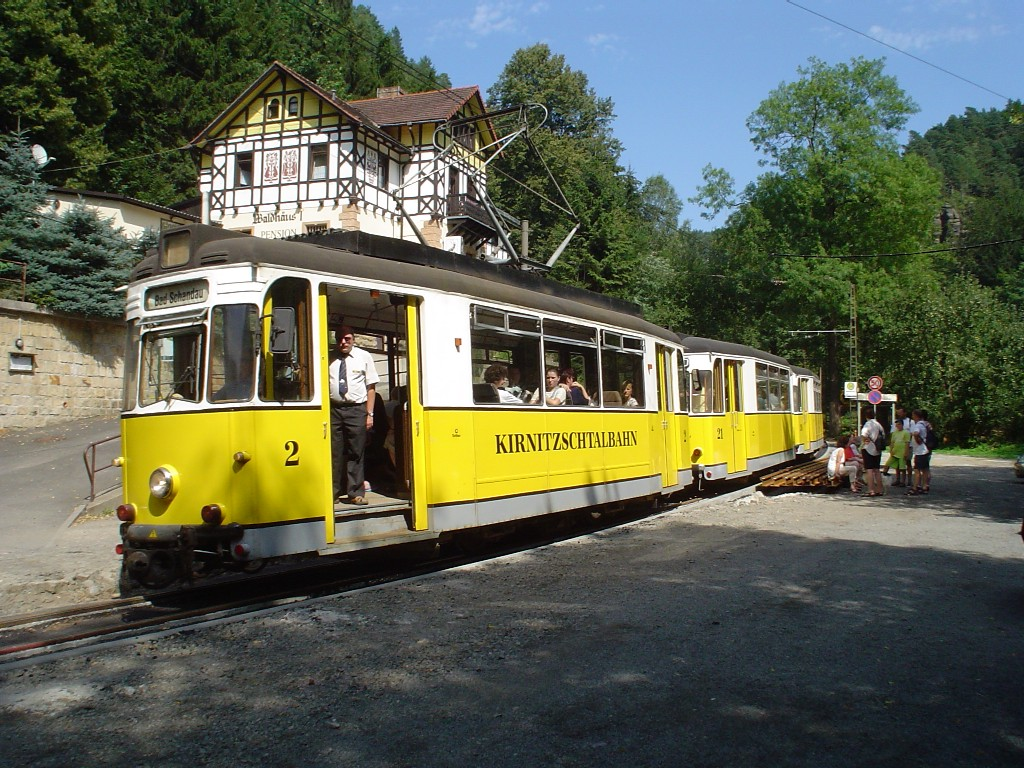
OVPS tram on the Kirnitzschtal Tramway
