= Friedewald train collision =

2009 railway incident in Saxony, Germany

Details
- Date: 12 September 2009; 17:45 local time (15:45 UTC)
- Location: Between Friedewald and Friedewald Bad stations
- Coordinates: 51°07′58″N 13°39′27″E
- Country: Germany
- Line: Lößnitzgrundbahn
- Operator: Sächsische Dampfeisenbahngesellschaft mbH
- Incident type: Head-on collision
- Cause: Crew error: train leaving station on single-track line without permission

Statistics
- Trains: Two steam-hauled passenger trains
- Passengers: c250
- Deaths: 0
- Injured: 121, including 4 serious
- Damage: Severe damage to two locomotives and twelve carriages

The Friedewald train collision was a railway accident on 12 September 2009 in Saxony, Germany. It involved two steam-hauled passenger trains of the narrow gauge heritage Radebeul–Radeburg railway (German: Lößnitzgrundbahn). One hundred and twenty-one people were injured, four of them seriously. Substantial damage was sustained by the locomotives and rolling stock.

== Background ==
On the weekend of 12–13 September 2009, the 750 mm (2 ft 5 1/2 in) gauge Lößnitzgrundbahn was holding a gala to celebrate the 125th anniversary of the opening of the railway. Four train compositions (three of them were extra trains from various other narrow-gauge railways) were operating on the line as part of the gala, performing fifty-five train journeys on the line instead of the usual twenty-eight. Some of the trains were assembled to represent distinct periods in the railway's history, one of them recreating a train from 1955 used rolling stock from the Mansfelder Bergwerksbahn in Saxony-Anhalt. The last and a resident train were later involved in the head-on collision.

Another accident had already happened earlier the afternoon. A double-headed train hauled by Saxon-Meyer 0-4-4-0Ts Nos.145 and 176 was in collision with a BMW car at an open level crossing in Radebeul. The result of this accident was that the planned timetable had to be abandoned. The Lößnitzgrundbahn is single track with passing loops at some stations. Because of the schedule disruption, trains were not passing each other at the planned locations.

== Accident ==
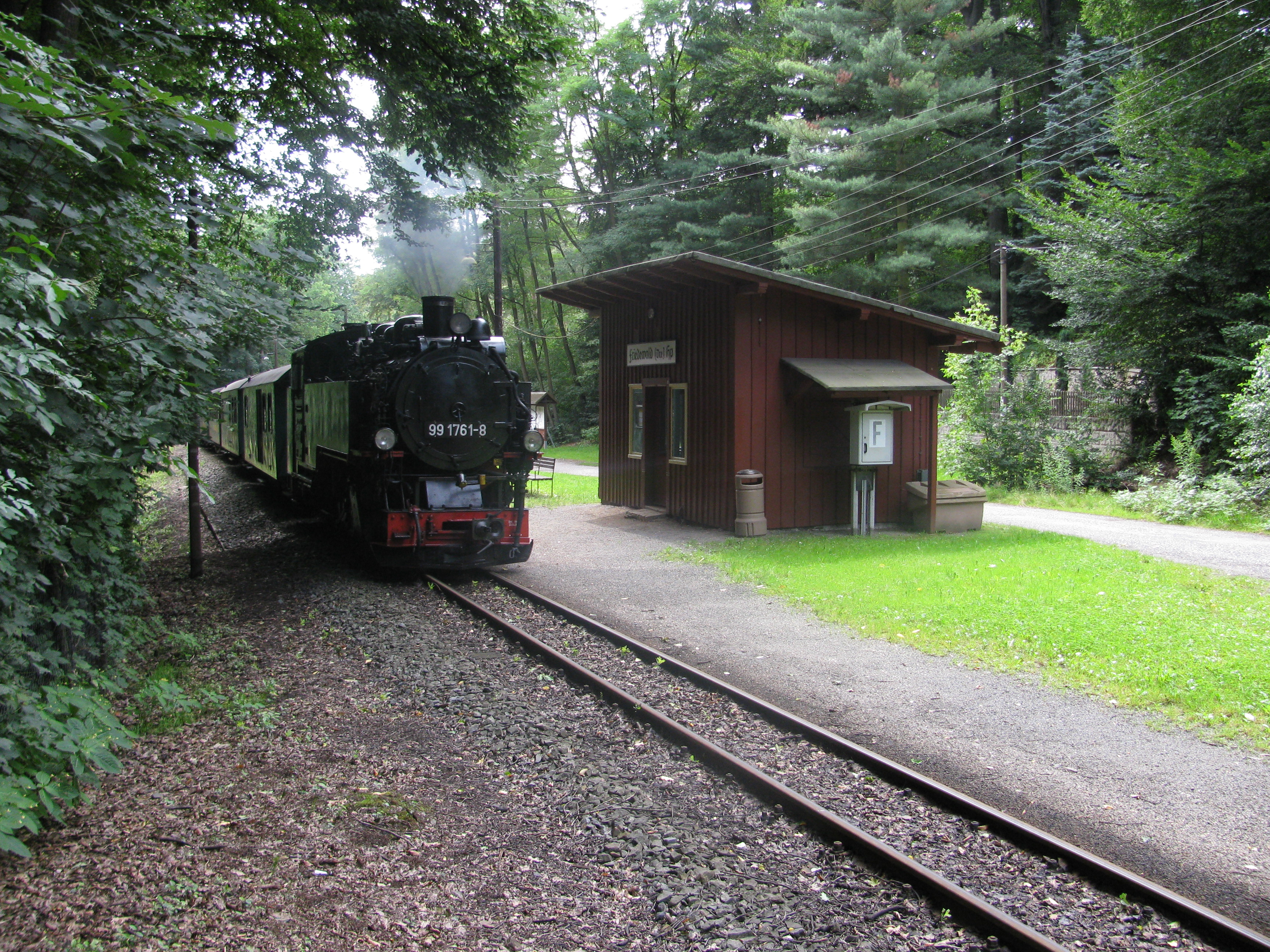
Friedewald station near the collision site

At 17:45 local time, two passenger trains were involved in a head-on collision on the single track between Friedewald Haltepunkt and Friedewald Bad stations of the Moritzburg municipality, approximately halfway between the streets Karlstraße and An der Siedlung. The train hauled by No. 99 1789-9 was on a regular scheduled service train while that hauled by No. 20 was one of the extra gala trains. Around 250 passengers were travelling on the two trains. Both trains were travelling at a speed of about 25 kilometres per hour (16 mph), and entered a single-tracked long turn in a narrow, forested valley from opposite directions. The drivers were able to notice one another's trains only at short distance, and while both drivers promptly started braking, the trains collided with a speed of 20 kilometres per hour (12 mph). Five carriages derailed.

As a result of the accident, all trains on the line were cancelled, as was the rest of the gala. Ambulances and a helicopter were used to ferry the injured passengers to hospital. Buses were laid on to replace the train service. Work began on 13 September to remove the damaged trains. The line was closed until 15 September and re-opened on early 16 September.

== Injuries ==
One hundred and twenty-one people, including passengers as well as both drivers and firemen, were injured, four seriously, but not critically. Fifty-two injured passengers, including seven children under ten years of age, were rescued from the collision site by the local police and fire departments and the German Red Cross, and taken to six different local hospitals. The other injured registered in the days after the accident. By 14 September, only one person was detained in hospital.

== Locomotives involved ==
99 1789-9

The first locomotive involved was No. 99 1789-9, a 2-10-2T built in 1956 and resident on the line.

20

The second locomotive involved was No. 20, an 0-8-0. This locomotive built by Lokomotivbau Karl-Marx, Potsdam-Babelsberg in 1951. Four hundred such engines were built as part of the East German World War II reparations for the Soviet Union. In 1996, No. 20 was bought as scrap metal in Estonia and transferred to Saxony-Anhalt by the Mansfelder Bergwerksbahn association, and since 2000, after an extensive overhaul, operated on the association's narrow gauge railway with the same name. It was visiting the Lößnitzgrundbahn railway as part of the gala. After the accident, the badly damaged locomotive was taken to the Sächsische Dampfeisenbahngesellschaft (SDG) workshops in Oberwiesenthal for assessment. There were reports that the locomotive was so badly damaged that it might be written off, but it was repaired.

== Damage ==
Locomotive No. 20 suffered severe damage in the accident, as did the carriages it was hauling at the time. The cost of repairs was estimated at €1,000,000 (£900,000). After the derailed carriages had been lifted back on the track with hydraulic jacks, both damaged locomotives and seventeen carriages were transported from the collision site to Radebeul Ost station by diesel locomotives for inspection. After inspection in October 2009, locomotive No. 20 was being disassembled and repaired in Oberwiesenthal from November 2009, its boiler was repaired in Piła. Repairs to locomotive 99 1789-9 followed. According to the Lößnitzgrundbahn's vice manager, Mirko Froß, the repair costs are covered by the railway's insurance. The track, which had only suffered minor damage, was repaired before the line reopened on 16 September. Twelve severely damaged carriages were repaired in the SDG's workshops in Marienberg. Until the carriages were repaired, the Lößnitzgrundbahn used carriages borrowed from the SDG's other narrow-gauge railways, namely Weißeritztalbahn and Fichtelbergbahn. Many of the carriages suffered damage to their end verandah in the accident. The verandah of the leading carriage of the train hauled by No. 20 had the tender of the locomotive ride up upon it.

The repair of No. 20 was carried out by the SDG at its Oberwiesenthal workshops. The tender was rebuilt by SDGs parent company BVO in Marienberg. Repairs to the boiler were carried out by Interlok, Piła, Poland. Repairs to No. 20 included new tender frames and replacement of a section of the boiler. The locomotive returned to service in May 2011. Repairs to 99 1789 were carried out after No. 20 was completed.

== Investigation ==
The accident was investigated by the local police. Spokesman Joerg Weyand said "The reasons are not clear at the moment. We cannot say if human error or technical failure caused the crash". The parts played in the accident by a driver and a train conductor are under investigation. As of 2 October 2009, the state's attorneys' investigations were still going on. Expert for transport safety Ulrich Maschek of the Dresden University of Technology criticized that the trains were not equipped with GPS-based modules automatically warning or halting trains about to collide: "Modern technology and historical vehicles are not mutually exclusive", he said.

It is indicated that the accident was caused by one train leaving a station without permission. Court proceedings before Amtsgericht Meißen confirmed that the scheduled train No. 3011, hauled by engine 99 1789, had left Friedewald Bad without permission despite the other train on the line. In addition, the train crew had failed to stop at a signalling board (an "So 5" trapezoid board) and used the wrong track in Friedewald Bad. Driver and conductor were fined.
