= Radebeul–Radeburg railway =

Railway line in Germany

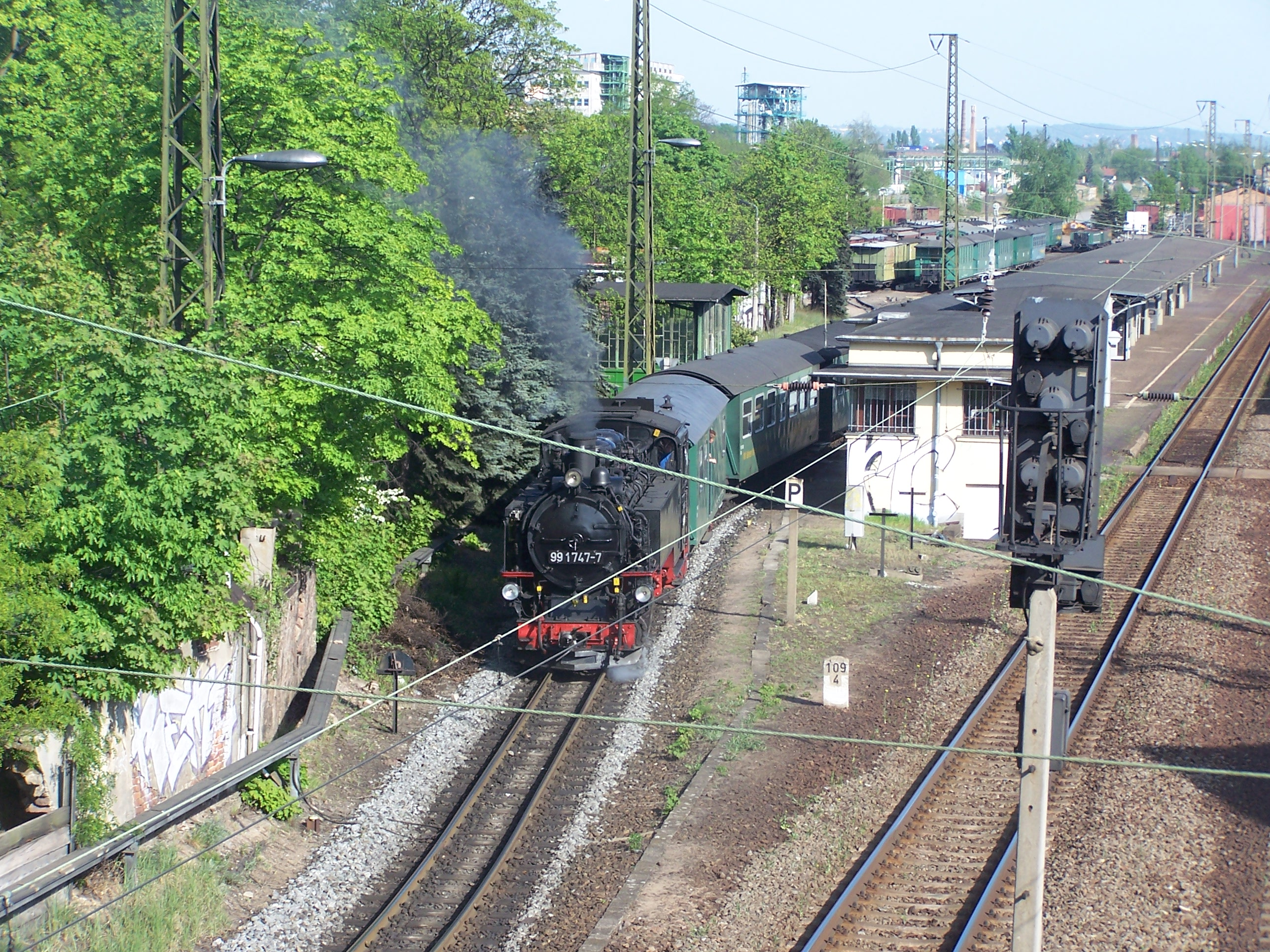
- Train on the Radebeul–Radeburg railway leaving Radebeul East station

Overview
- Line number: 6970
- Termini: Radebeul East; Radeburg

Service
- Type: Narrow gauge railway
- Route number: 509, 12501
- Operator(s): Royal Saxon State Railways, Deutsche Reichsbahn, DR, Saxon Steam Railway Company
- Depot: Radebeul

History
- Opened: September 14, 1884

Technical
- Line length: 16.49 km (10.25 mi)
- Track gauge: 750 mm (2 ft 5 1/2 in)
- Minimum radius: 75 m (245 ft)
- Operating speed: 30 km/h (20 mph)
- Maximum incline: 16.6 ‰ or 1.66 %
Route map
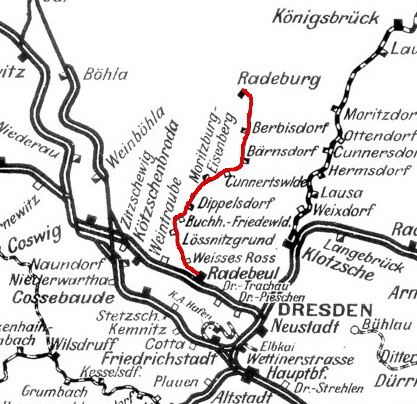

The Radebeul–Radeburg railway, also known as the Lößnitzgrundbahn ("Lössnitz Valley Railway") and locally nicknamed the Lößnitzdackel (Lößnitz Dachshund), is a 750 mm (2 ft 5 1/2 in) gauge narrow gauge steam-hauled railway in the outskirts of Dresden, Germany. It should not be confused with the Lößnitz Tramway, known in German as the Lößnitzbahn or the Lößnitzschaukel, which was a metre gauge interurban tramway that connected Dresden with Radebeul.

Primarily a tourist attraction, the Radebeul–Radeburg railway maintains a year-round timetable. It runs between Radebeul East station on the main Deutsche Bahn line between Dresden and Meissen and the small towns of Moritzburg and Radeburg north of Dresden. Scheduled traffic on the line is maintained by Sächsische Dampfeisenbahngesellschaft mbH (former BVO Bahn), using steam locomotives built in the 1950s.

Older trains, using engines and cars built in the late 19th and early 20th century, are maintained by the non-profit Traditionsbahn Radebeul. The older trains operate on the line for special events.

== History ==
On 12 September 2009, two steam-hauled passenger trains were involved in a head-on collision between Friedewald Bad and Friedewald stations. A total of 121 people were injured, four seriously.

In early 2011, it was reported that proposed budgetary cuts on the Saxon narrow gauge lines may involve the closure of the section of this line from Moritzburg to Radeburg. The section between Radebeul and Moritzburg carries a significant number of tourists visiting Schloss Moritzburg, but the remaining 8 kilometres (5.0 mi) onward to Radeburg is less used. An alternative proposal was to serve this section with a railcar, allowing a more frequent service as far as Moritzburg without needing additional steam trains. As of June 2020, service is provided along the full route.

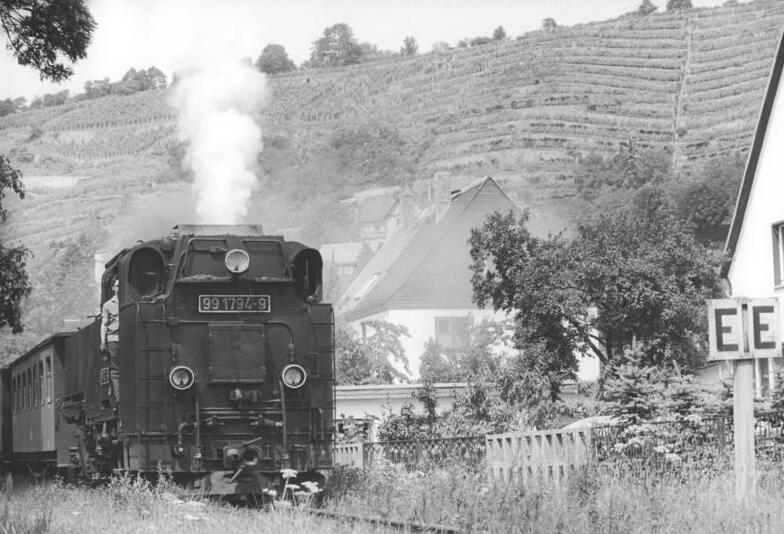
Train at the 100 year anniversary in 1984

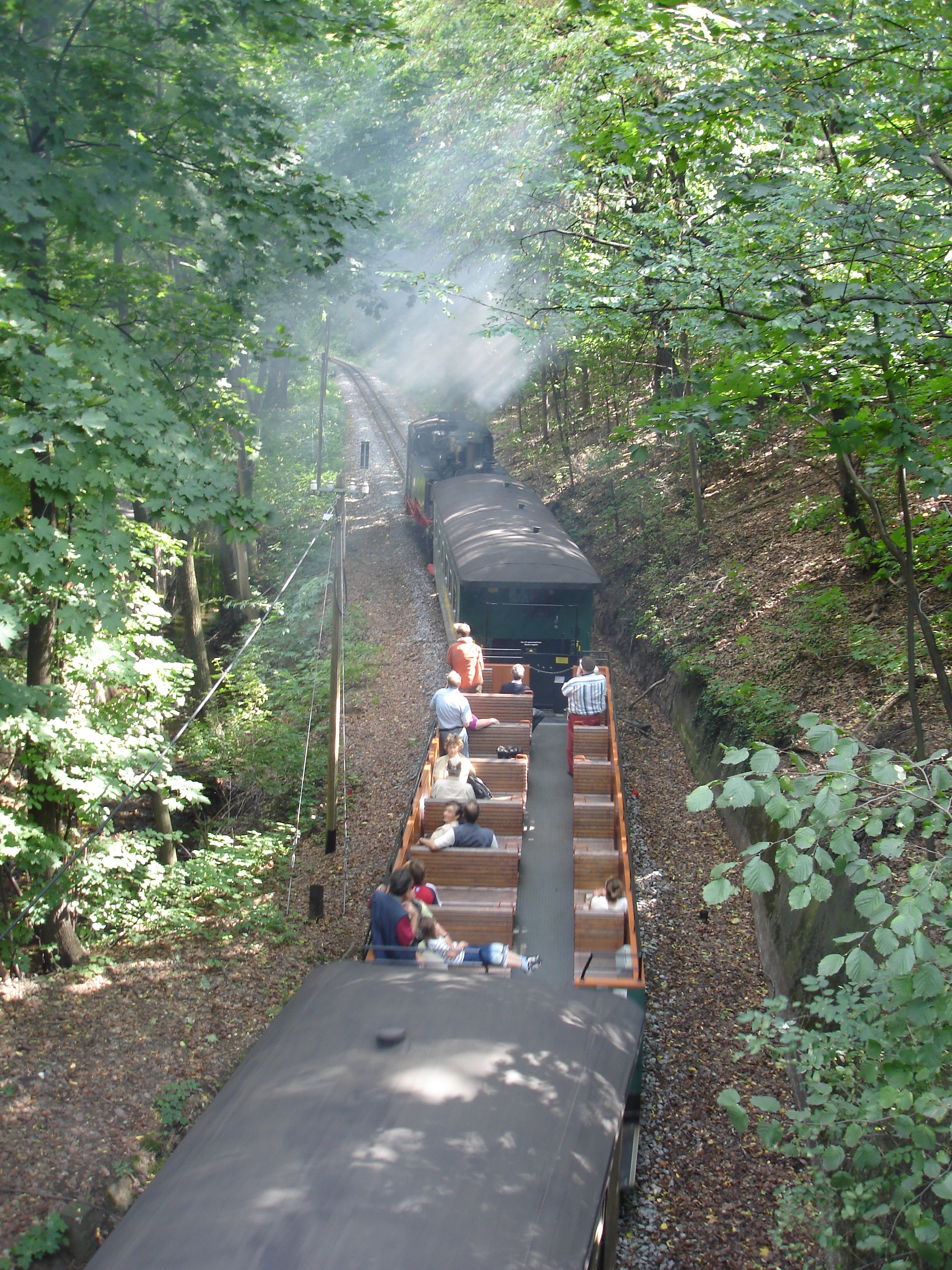
In the Lößnitz valley

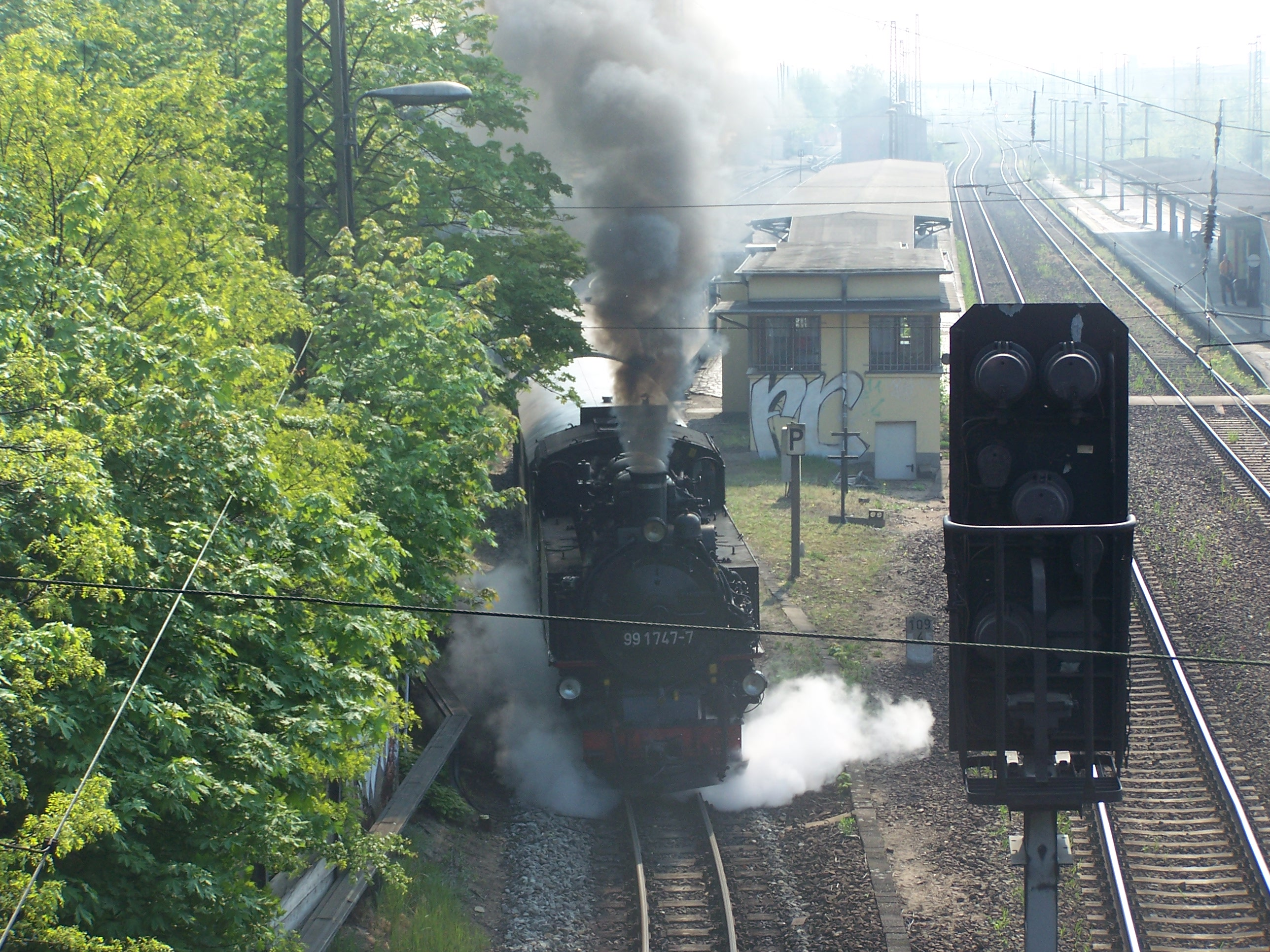
Train leaving Radebeul

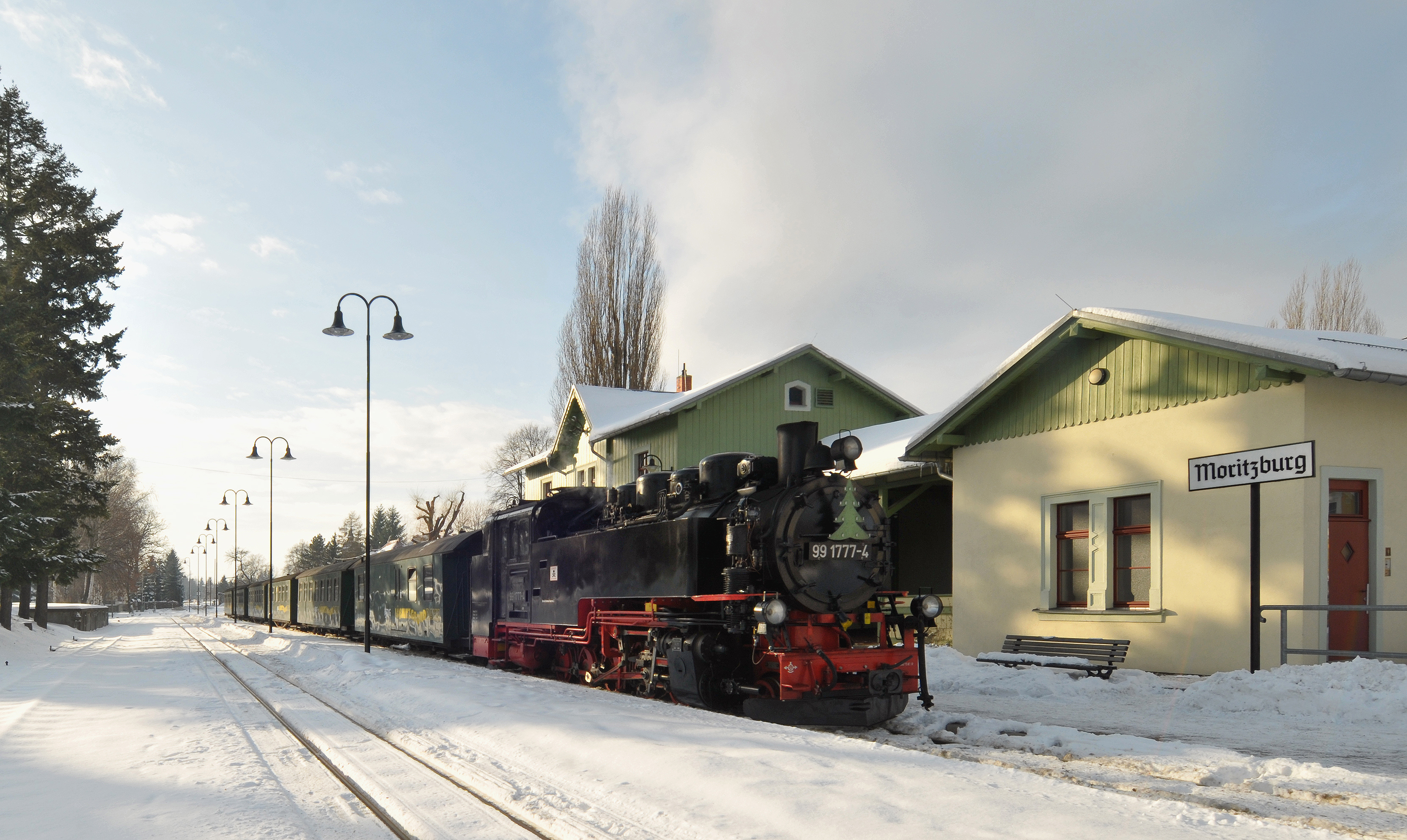
Steam locomotive No. 99 777, built in 1953 by VEB Lokomotivbau Karl Marx Babelsberg (LKM), photographed in 2012 pulling an excursion train at Moritzburg

== Locomotives ==
No.	Power Type	Loco Type/Class	Year built	Axel Arrangement	Current Status
99 608	Steam	Saxon IV-K	1921	0-4-4-0	In service (Special trains only)
99 713	Steam	Saxon VI-K	1927	0-10-0T	Refurbishment
99 747	Steam	DRG Class 99.73-76	1933	2-10-2T	In Service
99 761	Steam	DRG Class 99.73-76	1933	2-10-2T	In Service
99 762	Steam	DRG Class 99.73-76	1933	2-10-2T	In Service
99 775	Steam	DR Class 99.77-79	1953	2-10-2T	Not in Service
99 777	Steam	DR Class 99.77-79	1953	2-10-2T	In Service
99 778	Steam	DR Class 99.77-79	1953	2-10-2T	Not in Service
99 779	Steam	DR Class 99.77-79	1953	2-10-2T	Not in Service
99 789	Steam	DR Class 99.77-79	1957	2-10-2T	Not in Service
L45H-358	Diesel	FAUR L45H	1969	Bo-Bo (B’B’)	In Service
