= Saxon Steam Railway Company =

Logo Sächsische Dampfeisenbahngesellschaft

The Saxon Steam Railway Company (Sächsische Dampfeisenbahngesellschaft mbH or SDG), formerly the BVO Bahn, is a German railway company in Saxony, that operates several Saxon narrow gauge railways. The SDG is a subsidiary of the BVO Verkehrsbetriebe Erzgebirge (BVO) and the Verkehrsverbund Oberelbe (VVO).

== History ==
The BVO Bahn was founded in 1998 when the Deutsche Bahn wanted to get rid of the narrow gauge Fichtelberg Railway (Fichtelbergbahn) from Cranzahl to the spa resort of Oberwiesenthal. On 4 May 1998 they took over the route. In order to gain more customers for this hitherto unprofitable line, daily steam locomotive services were implemented particularly to attract tourists. Initially it was even intended to extend the line to nearby Annaberg, but this plan could not be realised for financial reasons.

Since 2004 the SDG has also operated the Lößnitzgrund Railway (Lößnitzgrundbahn) from Radebeul to Radeburg. This route is particularly well known for its heritage trains that have run on Sundays and public holidays since 1974 and for the tourist attractions along the line, including the Karl-May Museum at Radebeul, and the hunting castle of Moritzburg.

The third Saxon narrow gauge railway that was taken over by the then BVO Bahn, is the Weisseritz Valley Railway (Weißeritztalbahn). This line was however destroyed in several places by the floods of 2002. It was partially reopened in 2008, but full reopening was in doubt because of budgetary cuts. Subsequently, funding was secured, and work on rebuilding the remainder of the line resumed in 2014; the remaining section from Dippoldiswalde to Kurort Kipsdorf reopened on 17 July 2017.

In accordance with the decisions of the VVO of 4 June 2007, Weißeritz district procured the route and the SDG took over the operation. At the same time the VVO took a 35% share in the SDG, because the Chemnitz city council insisted that the activities of companies formed by local communities should be restricted to a partnership role. The subsequent renaming of the BVO Bahn to the Saxon Steam Railway Company took place on 9 May 2007.

== Routes ==
- Fichtelbergbahn (Cranzahl–Oberwiesenthal)
- Lößnitzgrundbahn (Radebeul Ost–Radeburg)
- Weißeritztalbahn (Freital-Hainsberg–Kurort Kipsdorf).
