= Regionalverkehr Sächsische Schweiz-Osterzgebirge =

Regionalverkehr Sächsische Schweiz-Osterzgebirge GmbH
- Headquarters: Pirna, Germany
- Owner: Landkreis Sächsische Schweiz-Osterzgebirge
- Website: ovps.de

The Regionalverkehr Sächsische Schweiz-Osterzgebirge (RVSOE) is a company that operates public transport services in the German state of Saxony. It is a member of the Verkehrsverbund Oberelbe (Upper Elbe Transport Association), a transport association that manages a common public transport structure for Dresden and its surrounding areas.

The company operates around 240 buses on 19 urban bus routes and 72 regional bus routes, 10 ferries on 8 ferry routes, and 16 trams on one tram route. It carries around 18,000,000 passengers, and its vehicles cover approximately 13,000,000 kilometres (8,100,000 mi) per year.

The services of the VSOE include:

- Urban bus services in the town of Dippoldiswalde
- Urban bus services in the town of Freital
- Urban bus services in the town of Heidenau
- Urban bus services in the town of Neustadt in Sachsen
- Urban bus services in the town of Pirna
- Urban bus services in the town of Sebnitz
- Regional bus services in Saxon Switzerland
- Regional bus services in the Eastern Ore Mountains
- Ferry services on the River Elbe
- The Kirnitzschtal Tramway, a tourist oriented rural tram service

The company was created on January 1, 2019, when the Oberelbische Verkehrsgesellschaft Pirna-Sebnitz was merged with Regionalverkehr Dresden to create the new company. The new company is owned by the Landkreis Sächsische Schweiz-Osterzgebirge.

== Gallery ==
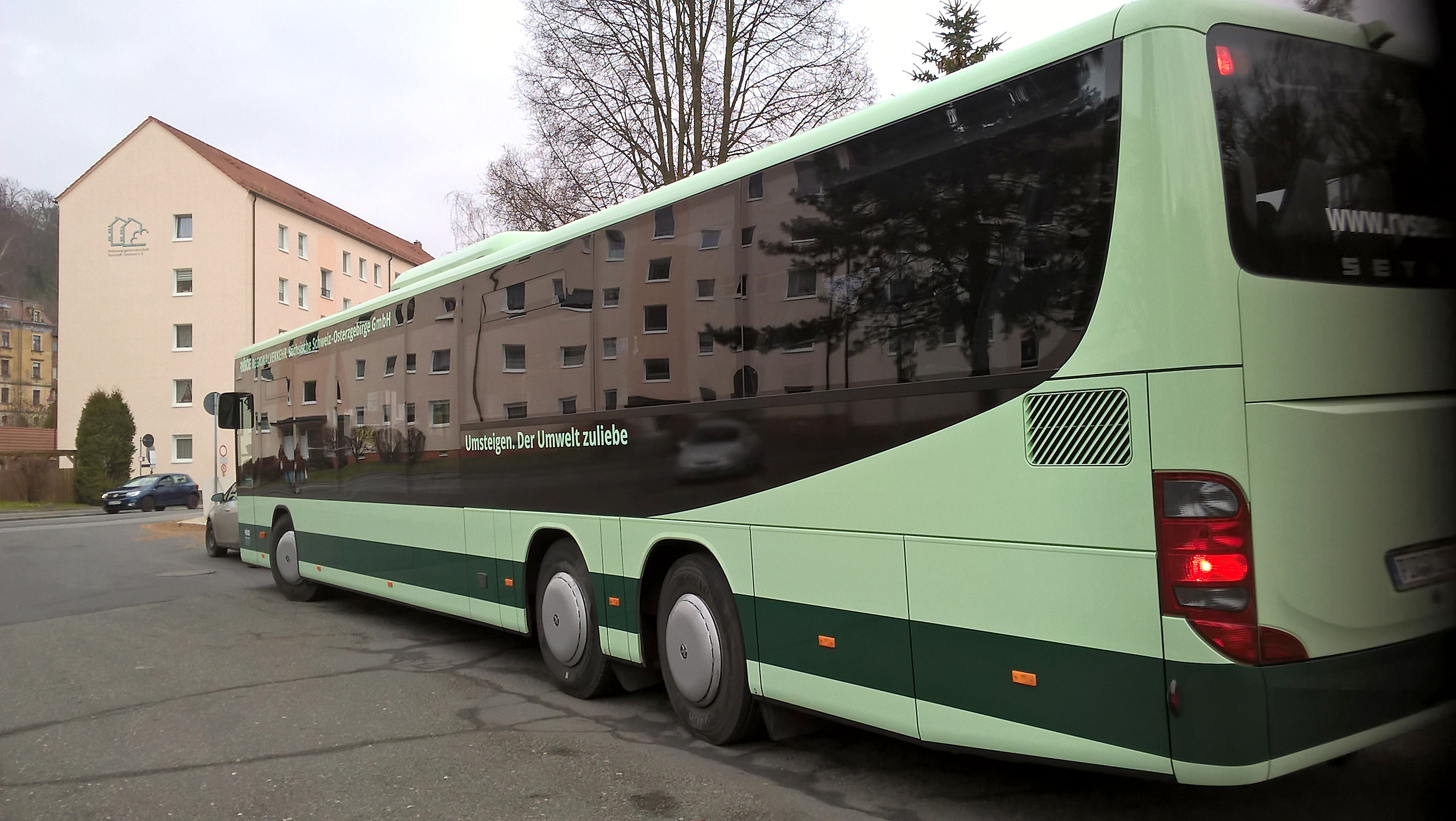
RVSOE bus

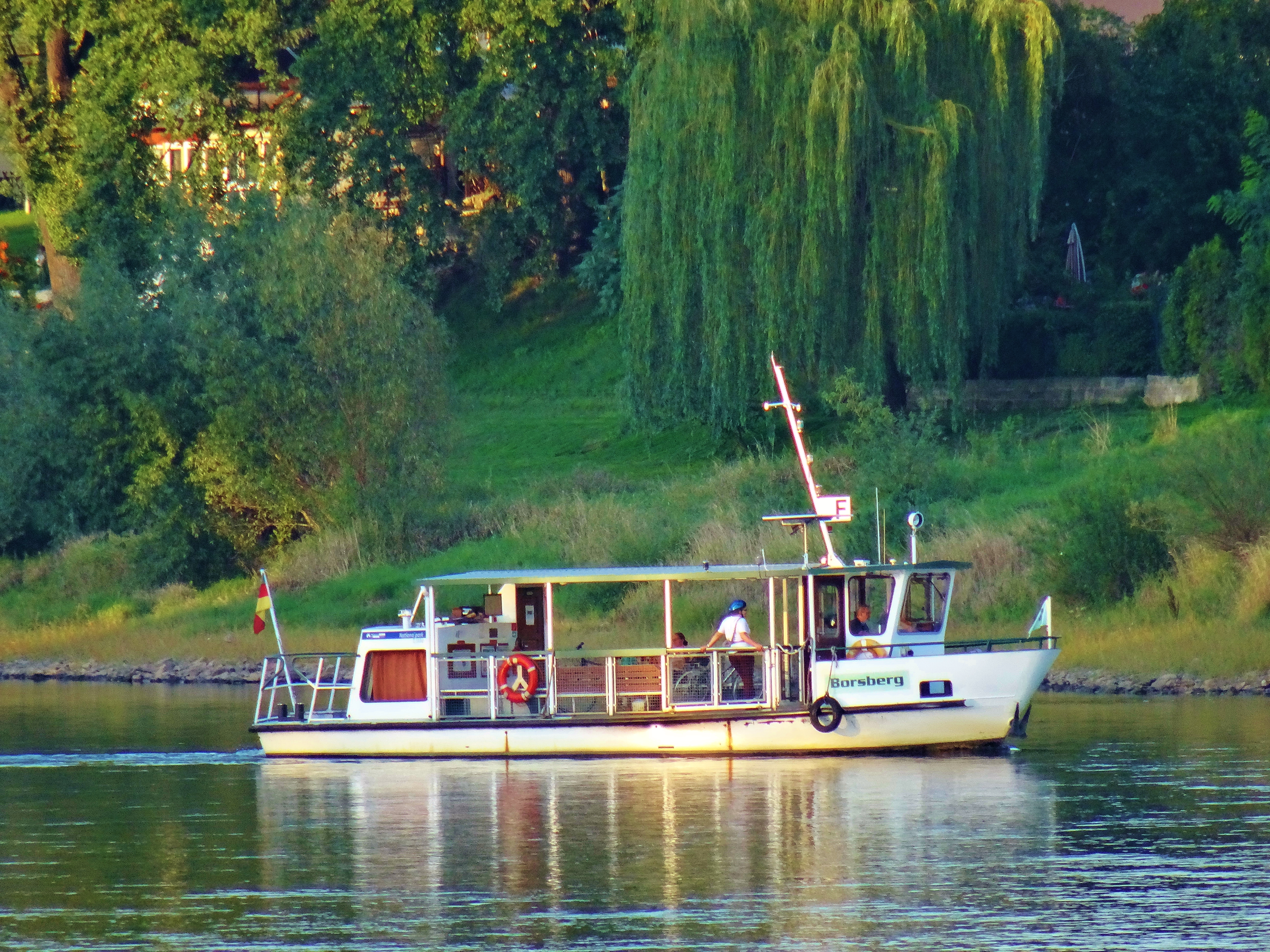
RVSOE ferry

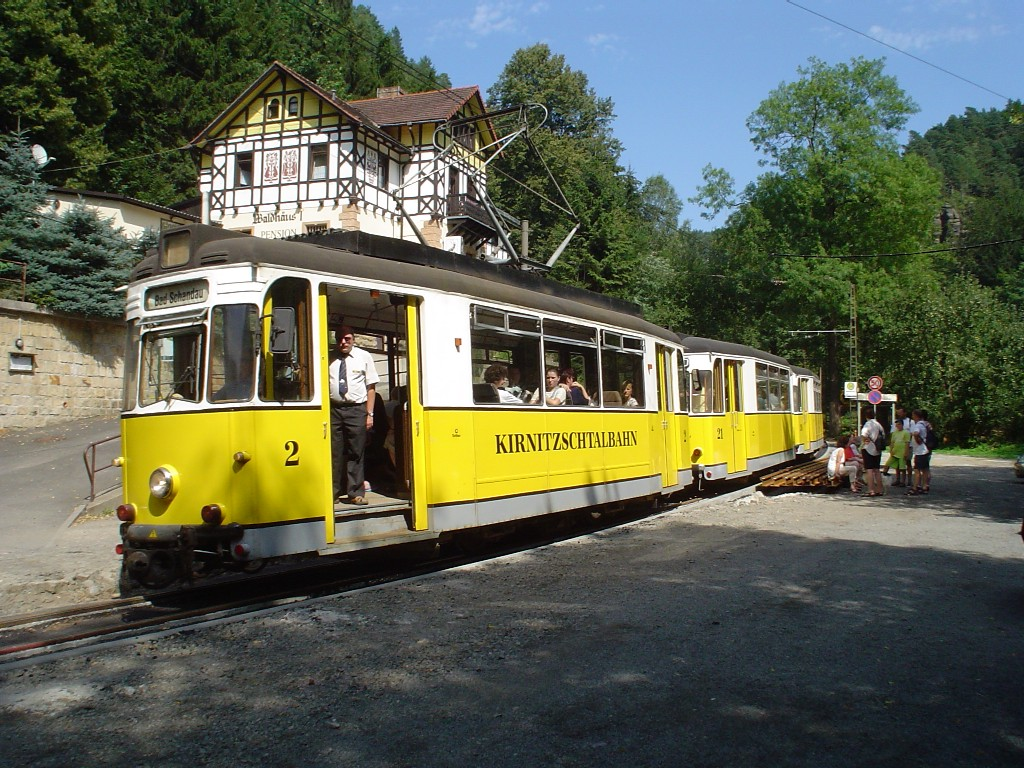
RVSOE tram
