= Lockwitztal tramway =

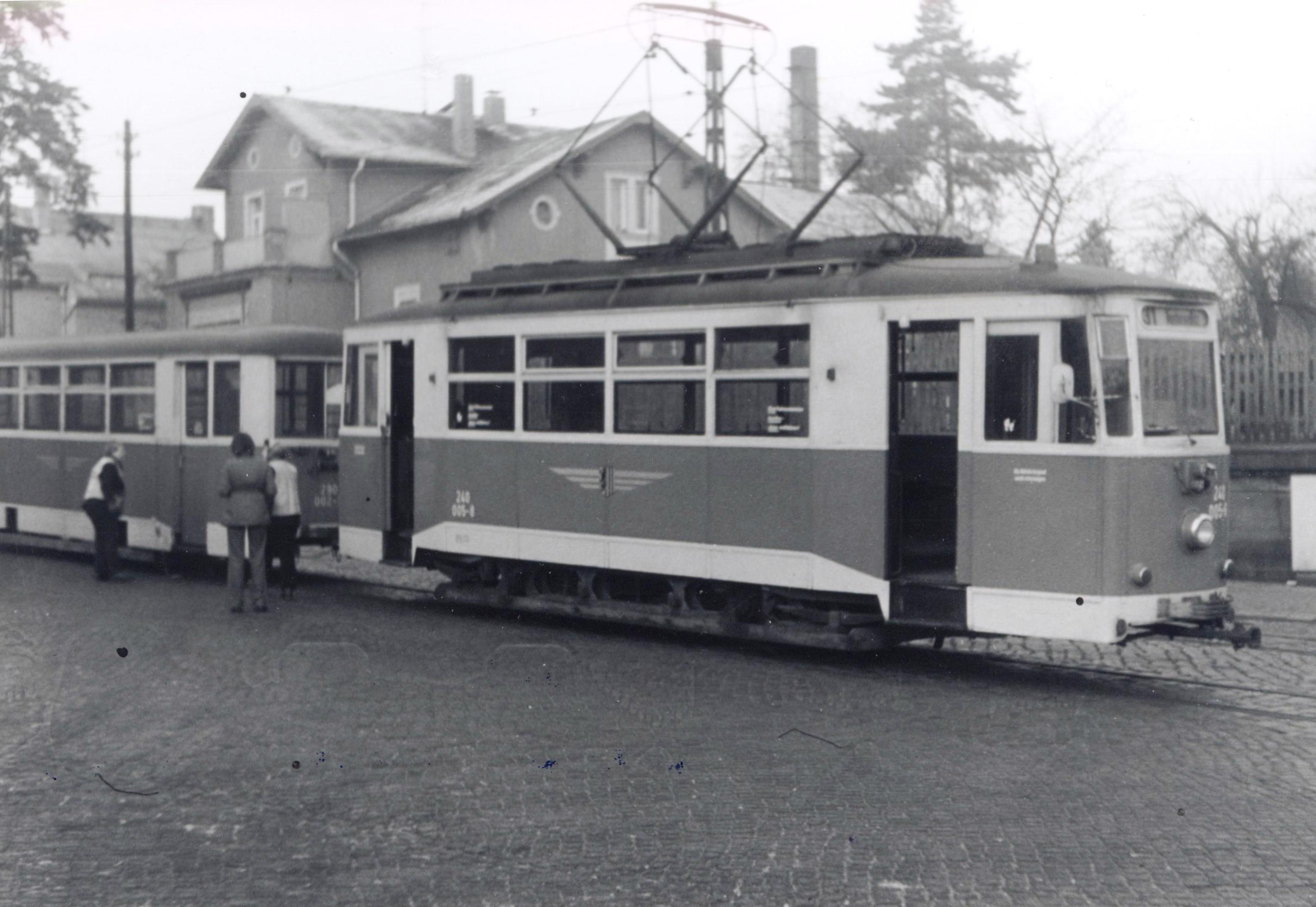
Car 240 005 (now preserved) arrives in Niedersedlitz on the last day of service

The Lockwitztal tramway, known in German as the Lockwitztalbahn, was a metre gauge interurban tramway in the German state of Saxony.

== History ==
The line connected the Dresden suburb of Niedersedlitz with the adjoining municipality of Kreischa. It opened in 1906, and was replaced by a bus service in 1977.

On closure, several of the Lockwitztal Tramway's cars were transferred to the Kirnitzschtal tramway. One of these cars (240 005) is now preserved at the Dresden Tram Museum, whilst another (240 008) is still used on occasional heritage services on the Kirnitzschtal Tramway.

== See also ==
- Trams in Dresden
- Lößnitz tramway
