= Lößnitz tramway =

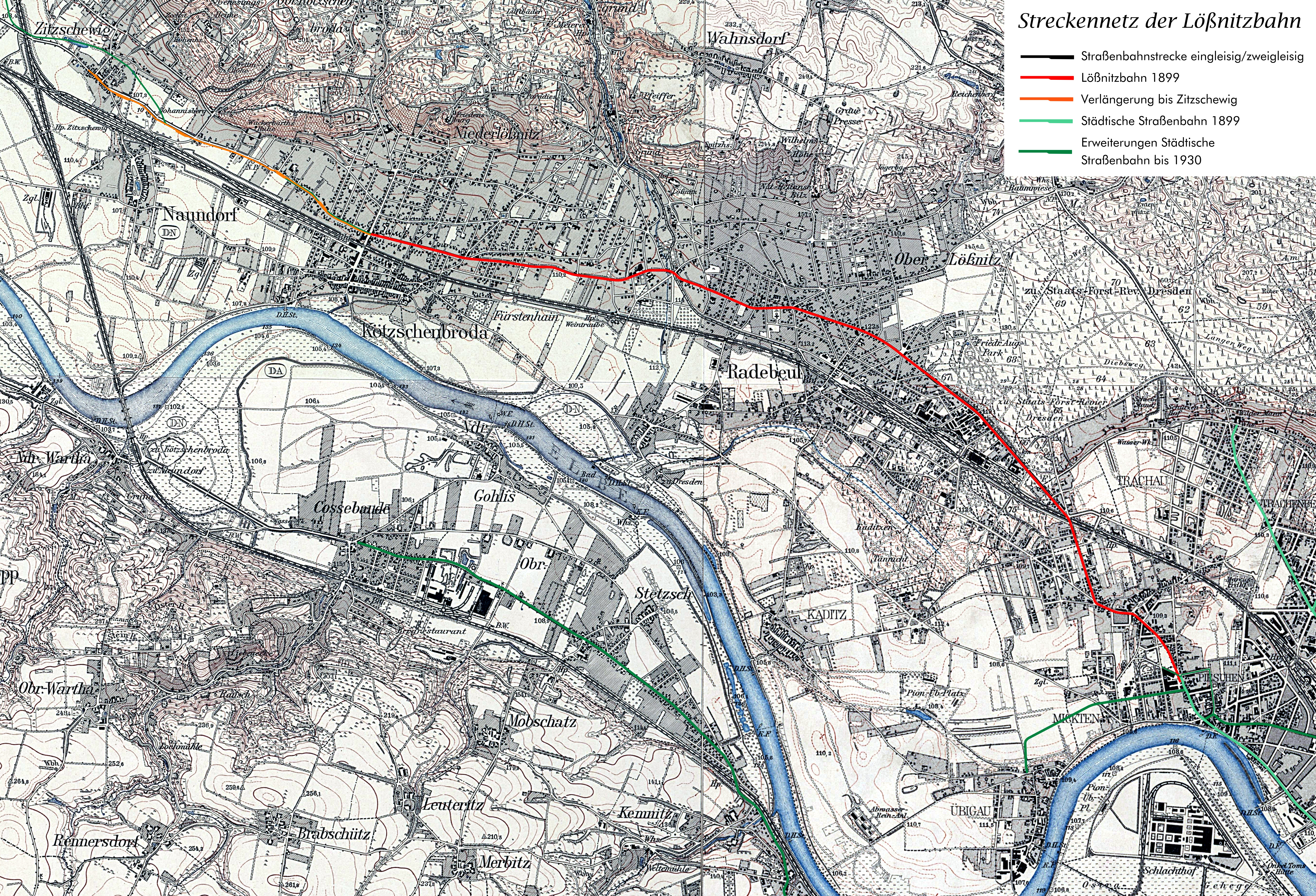
Lößnitz rail and tram routes, showing the Lößnitz Tramway in red

The Lößnitz tramway (German: Lößnitzbahn or Lößnitzschaukel) was a 1,000 mm (3 ft 3 3/8 in) interurban tramway that connected Dresden with Radebeul in the German state of Saxony. It should not be confused with the Radebeul–Radeburg railway, known in German as the Lößnitzgrundbahn or Lößnitzdackel, which is a 750 mm (2 ft 5 1/2 in) gauge steam railway.

== History ==
The Lößnitz tramway was opened in 1899, and provided interchange with the Dresden tram network at its inner terminus at Mickten in Dresden's suburbs. In the late 1920s, the line was rerouted and converted to the unusual Dresden tramway gauge of 1,450 mm (4 ft 9 3/32 in), a process completed in 1930. Today, it forms part of line 4 of the Dresdner Verkehrsbetriebe, which runs through from central Dresden and continues beyond Radebeul to Coswig and Weinböhla.

== See also ==
- Trams in Dresden
- Lockwitztal tramway
