= Verkehrsverbund Oberelbe =

Verkehrsverbund Oberelbe

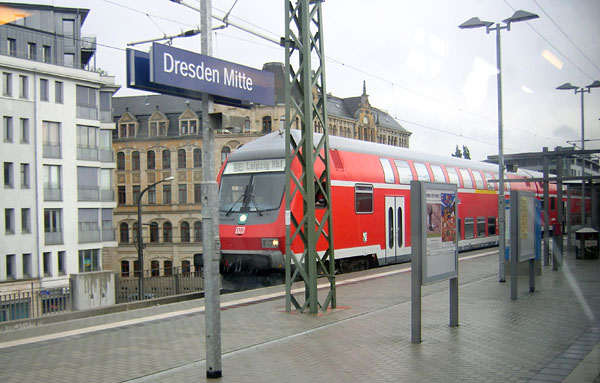
RegionalExpress train at Dresden-Mitte station

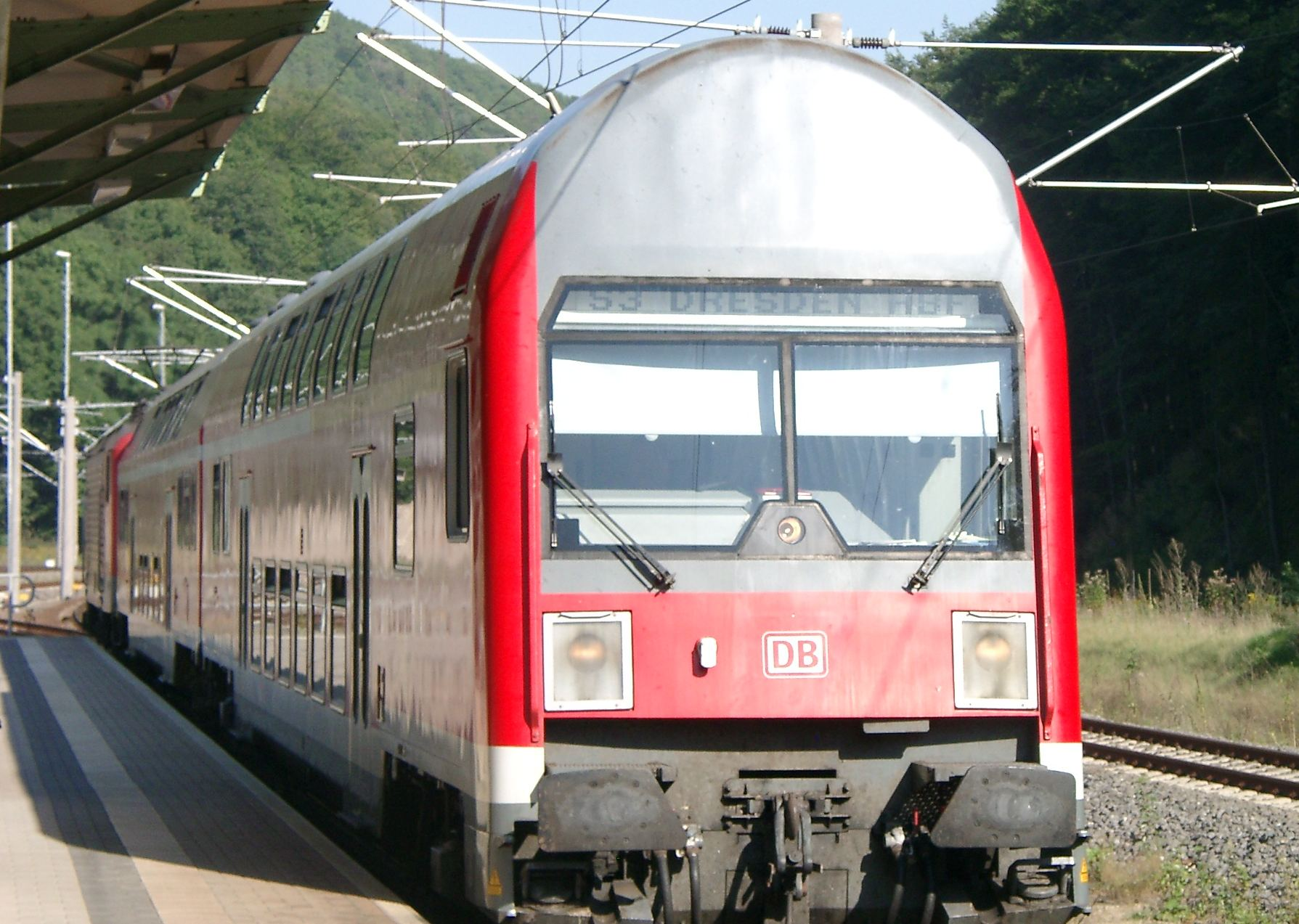
Dresden S-Bahn train at Tharandt

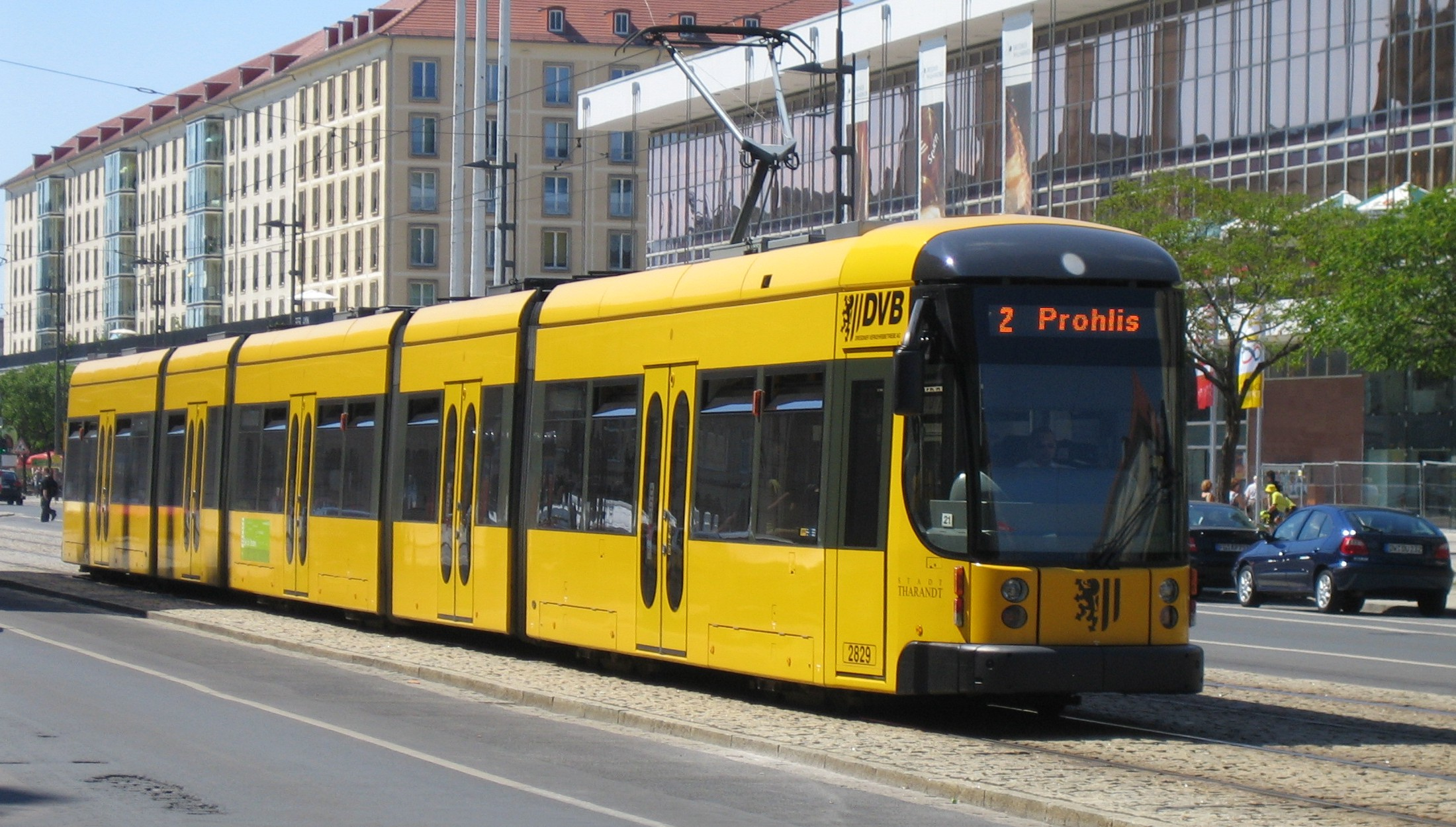
Dresden tram

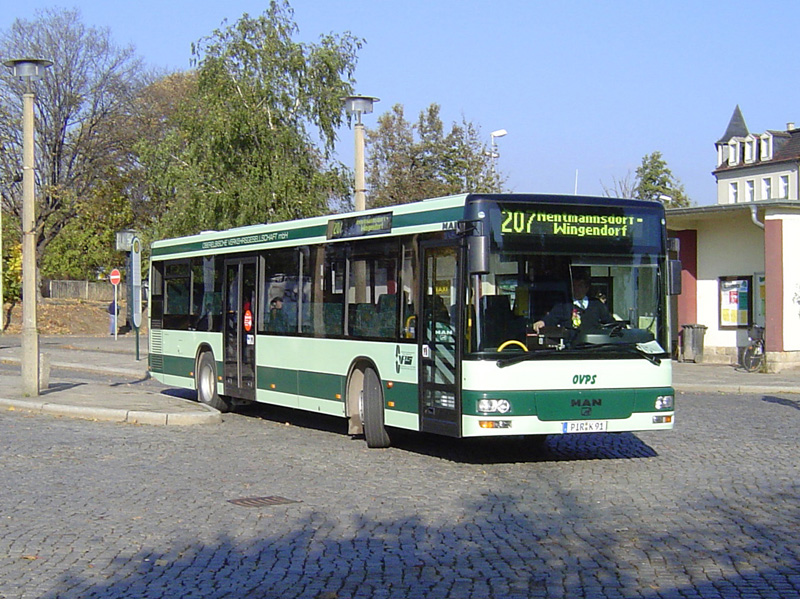
OVPS bus in Pirna

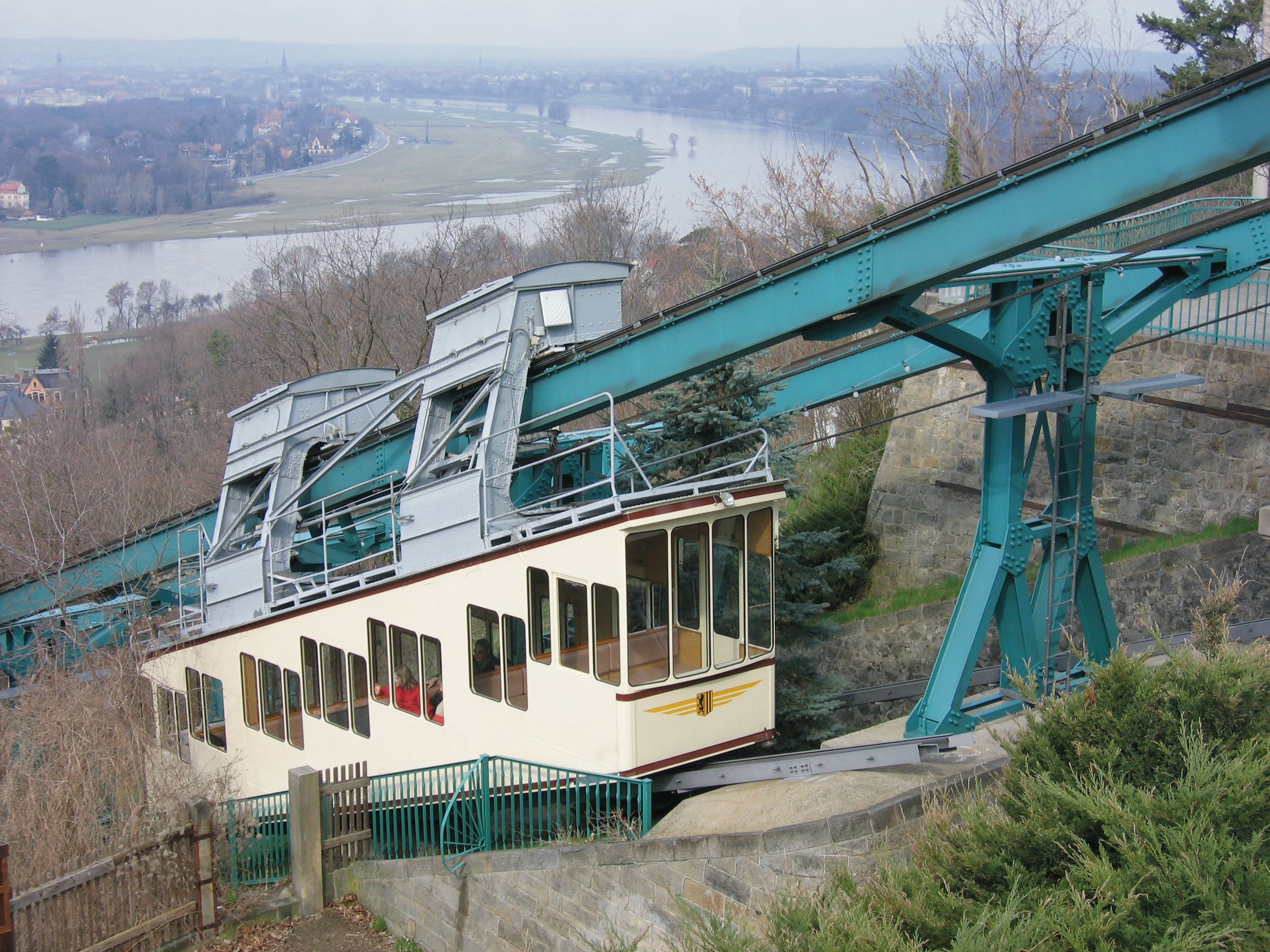
Schwebebahn Dresden

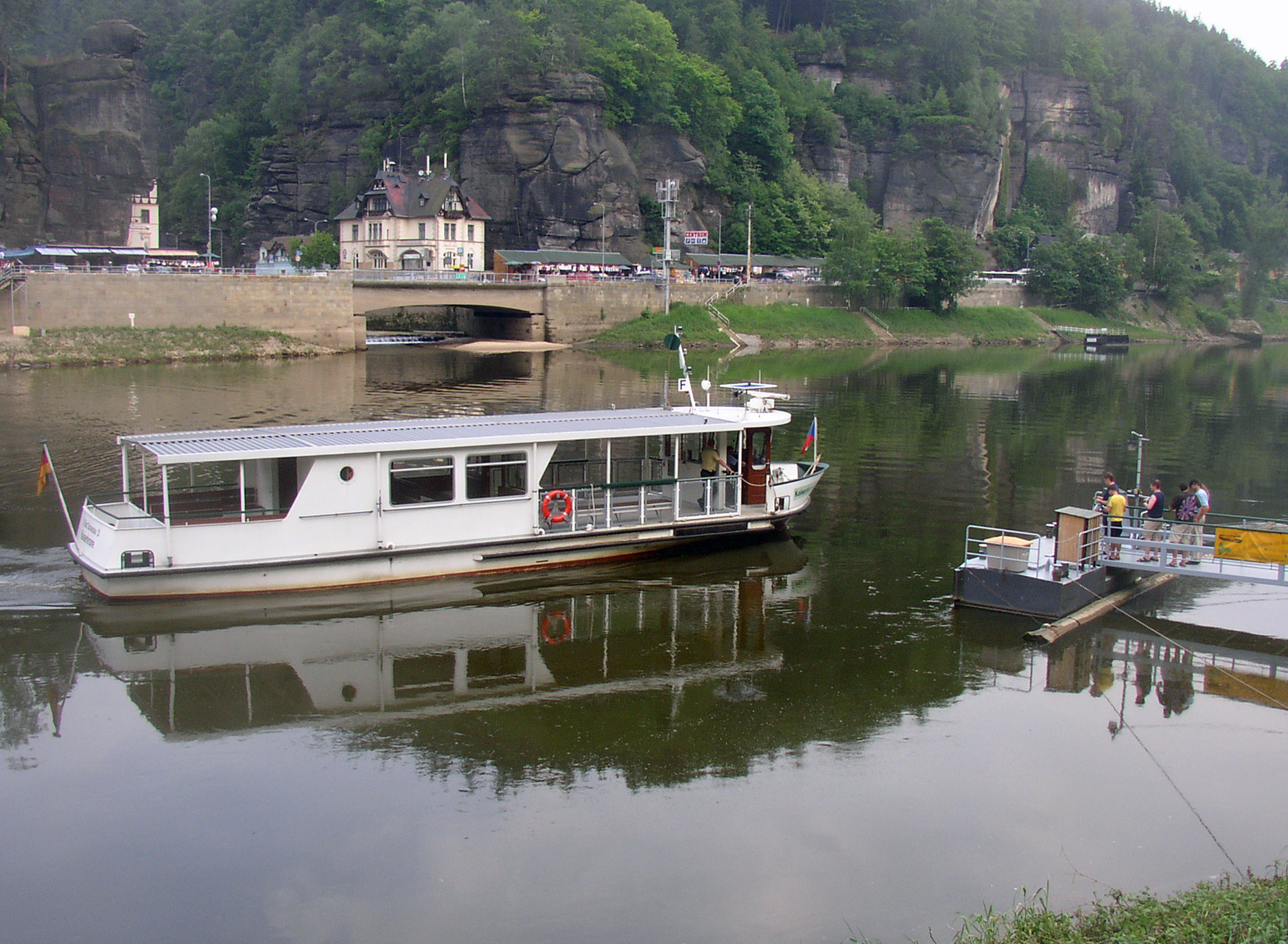
Schöna to Hřensko Ferry

The Verkehrsverbund Oberelbe (Upper Elbe Transport Association or VVO) is a transport association run by public transport providers in the Saxon Elbeland area of the German state of Saxony. The VVO area comprises the city of Dresden, together with the districts of Meißen and Sächsische Schweiz-Osterzgebirge, and the north-western part of the district of Bautzen.

On 24 May 1998, a uniform public transport tariff system was adopted by the VVO's member companies. The joint area is divided into 21 tariff zones, the largest of which extends over the entire city of Dresden.

== Members ==
The following companies are members of the association:

- DB Regio AG
- Dresdner Verkehrsbetriebe AG
- Mitteldeutsche Regiobahn
- Müller Busreisen GmbH
- Regionalbus Oberlausitz GmbH
- Regionalverkehr Sächsische Schweiz-Osterzgebirge GmbH
- Sächsische Dampfeisenbahngesellschaft mbH
- Satra Eberhardt GmbH
- Verkehrsgesellschaft Hoyerswerda mbH
- Verkehrsgesellschaft Meißen mbH

== Transport modes ==
The Verkehrsverbund Oberelbe covers a broad spectrum of transport modes. These include the regional trains operated by DB Regio and Städtebahn Sachsen, the Dresden S-Bahn system, two narrow gauge steam railway lines, the city trams of Dresden, the Kirnitzschtal Tramway, city and regional buses as well as ferries across the Elbe in Meissen, Dresden and Saxon Switzerland.

In addition, there are some more unusual modes, which the VVO network terms special tourist services. These include two funiculars in Dresden, the Standseilbahn Dresden and the Schwebebahn Dresden. Also included are the Kirnitzschtalbahn, a rural tramway line, and the Bad Schandau Elevator, both located in the scenic Saxon Switzerland area. Although the special tourist services are part of the grouping they are subject to special tariffs, and the standard VVO fares do not apply.
