= Radeburg =

- Town
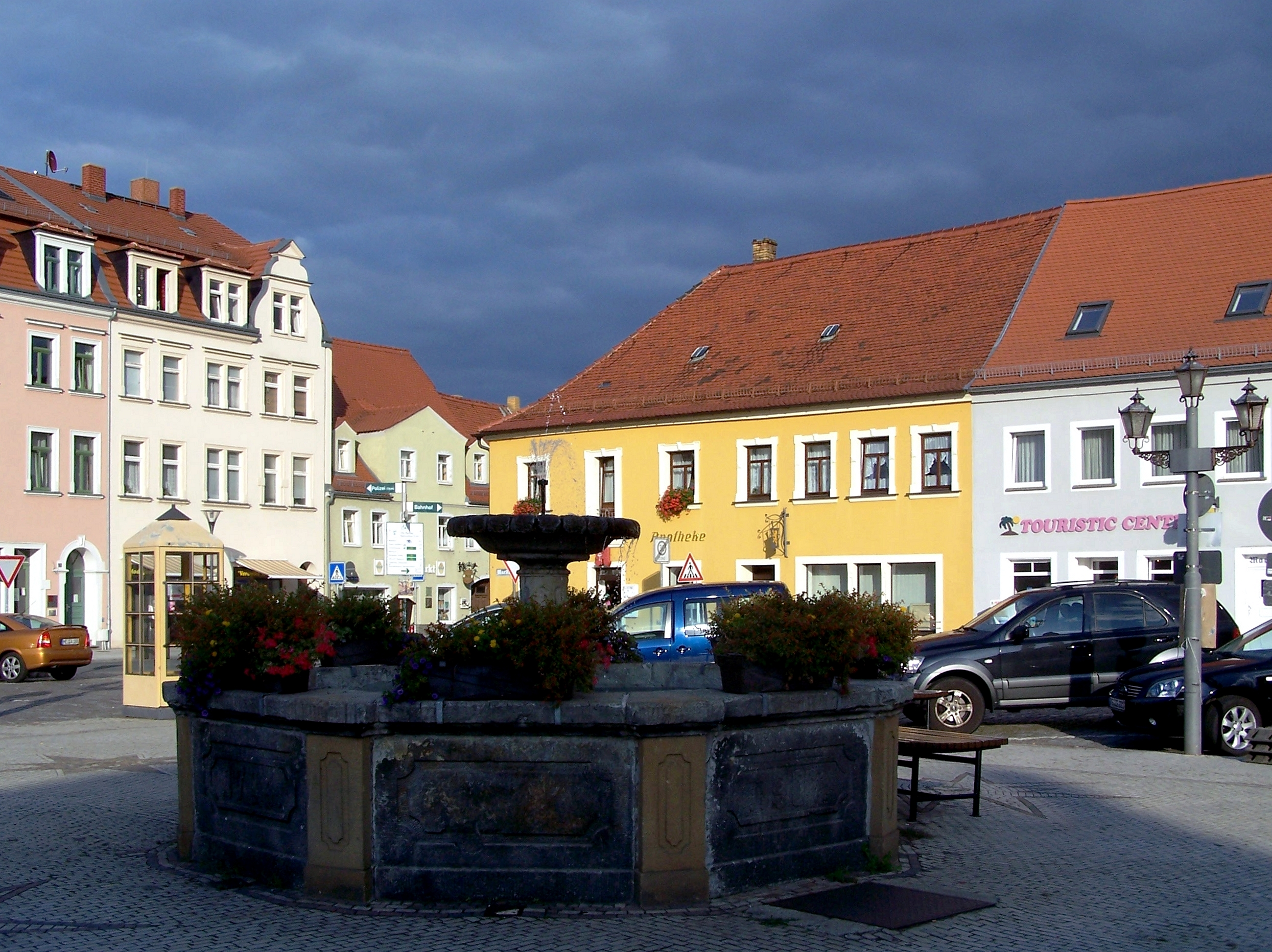
- Market square

- Coat of arms

- Location of Radeburg within Meißen district
- Interactive map of Radeburg
- Location within Germany Location within Saxony
- Coordinates: 51°12′45″N 13°43′32″E
- Country: Germany
- State: Saxony
- District: Meißen

Government
  - Mayor (2020–27): Michaela Ritter (Ind.)

Area
  - Total: 54.01 km^{2} (20.85 sq mi)
- Elevation: 149 m (489 ft)

Population (2025-12-31)
  - Total: 7,578
  - Density: 140.3/km^{2} (363.4/sq mi)
- Time zone: UTC+01:00 (CET)
  - Summer (DST): UTC+02:00 (CEST)
- Postal codes: 01468–01471
- Dialling codes: 035208
- Vehicle registration: MEI, GRH, RG, RIE
- Website: www.radeburg.de

Radeburg (German pronunciation: [ˈʁaːdəˌbʊʁk]) is a town in the district of Meißen, in Saxony, Germany. It is situated 19 km east of Meißen, and 18 km north of Dresden. The main tourist attraction is the narrow-gauge Radebeul-Radeburg railway line that connects Radeburg and Radebeul via Moritzburg.

The painter and illustrator Heinrich Zille was born in Radeburg.

The landscape artist Alfred Mailick moved into rooms at the Berbisdorf Water Castle in 1922.

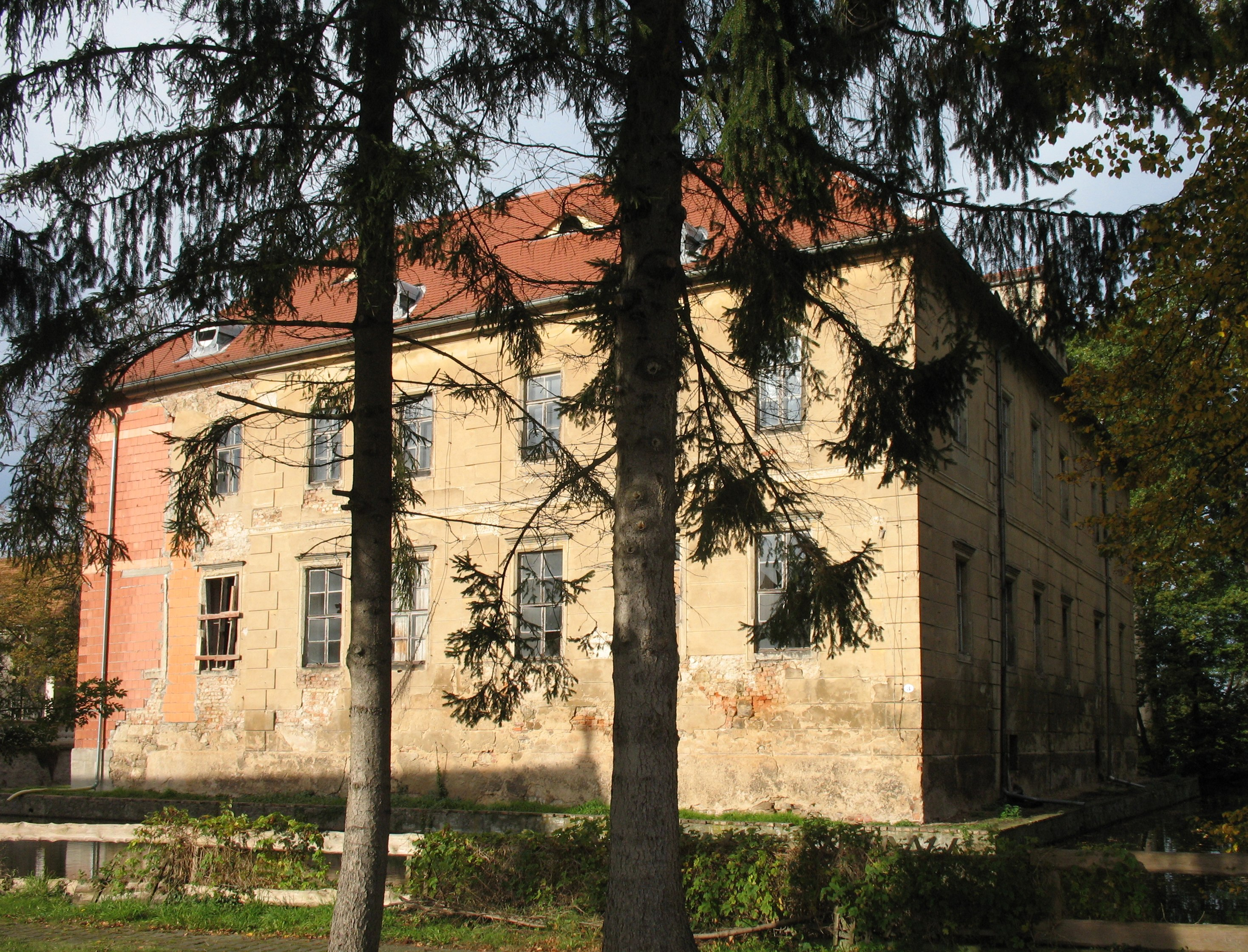
Water castle in Radeburg-Berbisdorf

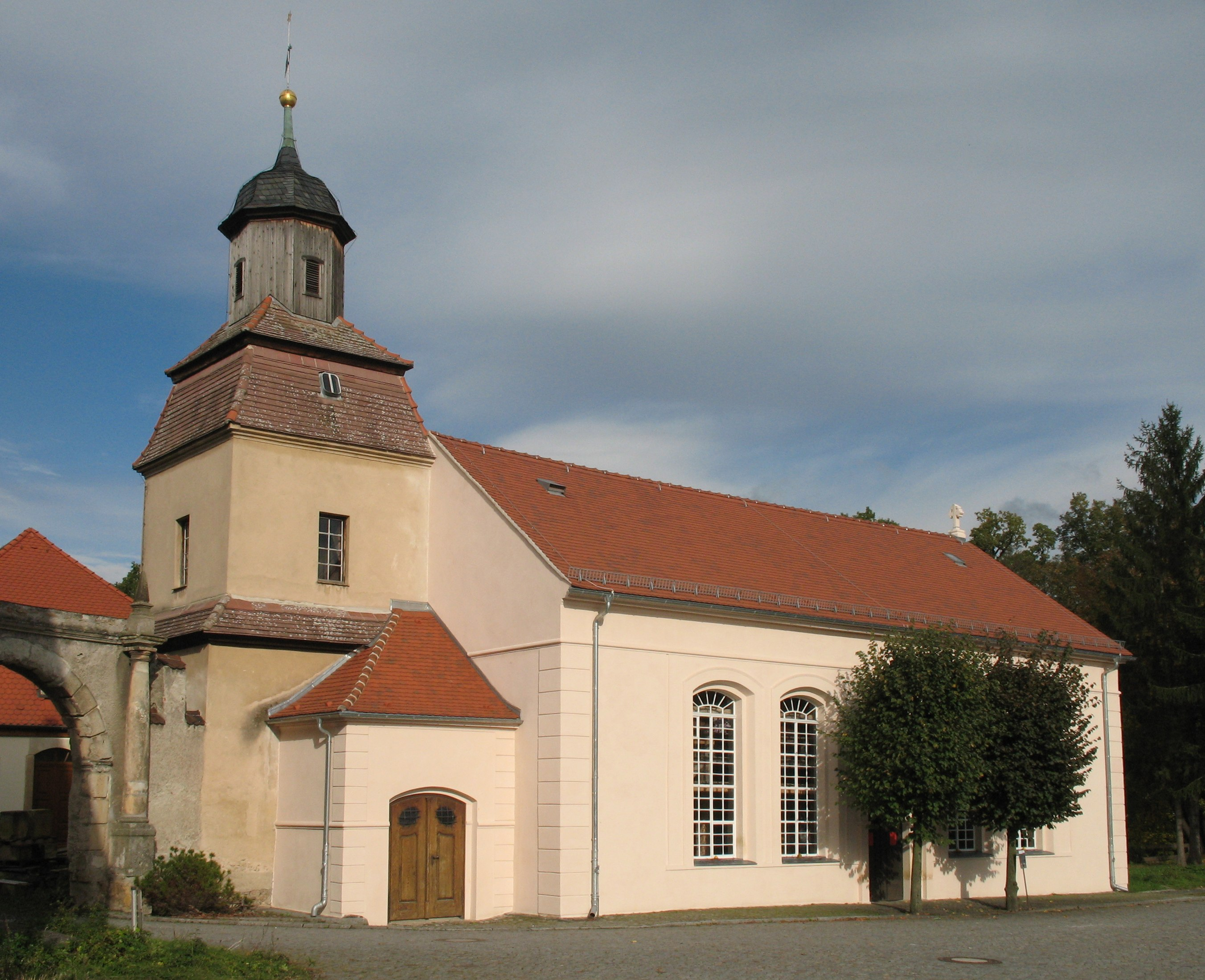
Church in Radeburg-Berbisdorf
