= Elbe Sandstone Mountains =

Mountain range in Germany

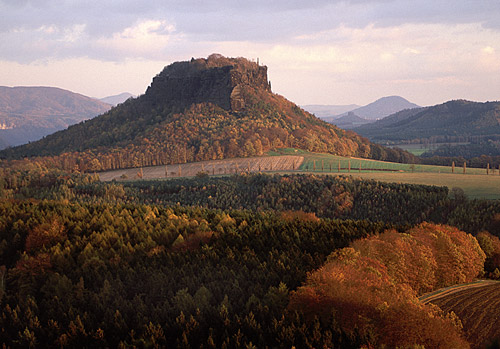
- Lilienstein, one of several small mesas in the Saxon part of the Elbe Sandstone Mountains

Highest point
- Peak: Děčínský Sněžník
- Elevation: 723 m (2,372 ft)
- Coordinates: 50°47′44″N 14°6′25″E

Geography
- Location within Czech Republic Location within Germany Location within Saxony Location within Europe
- Countries: Germany; Czech Republic
- States: Saxony; Bohemia

Geology
- Rock age: Cretaceous
- Rock type: Sandstone

The Elbe Sandstone Mountains, also called the Elbe Sandstone Highlands (German: Elbsandsteingebirge, pronounced [ɛlpˈz̥antʃtaɪnɡəˌbɪʁɡə]; Czech: Děčinská vrchovina, pronounced [ˈɟɛtʃɪnskaː ˈvr̩xovɪna]), are a mountain range straddling the border between the state of Saxony in southeastern Germany and the North Bohemian region of the Czech Republic, with about three-quarters of the area lying on the German side. In both countries, core parts of the mountain range have been declared a national park. The name derives from the sandstone which was carved by erosion. The river Elbe breaks through the mountain range in a steep and narrow valley.

The Saxon Switzerland and Bohemian Switzerland national parks, known also as Saxon-Bohemian Switzerland, are located within the territory of Elbe Sandstone Mountains.

== Geography ==
=== Extent ===
The Elbe Sandstone Mountains extend on both sides of the Elbe from the Saxon town of Pirna in the northwest toward Bohemian Děčín in the southeast. Their highest peak with 723 m (2,372 ft) is the Děčínský Sněžník in Bohemian Switzerland on the left bank of the river in Bohemian Switzerland north of Děčín. The mountain range links the Ore Mountains in the west with the Lusatian Highlands range of the Sudetes in the east. Saxon Switzerland and the Zittau Mountains of the Lusatian Mountains form the Saxon-Bohemian Chalk Sandstone Region.

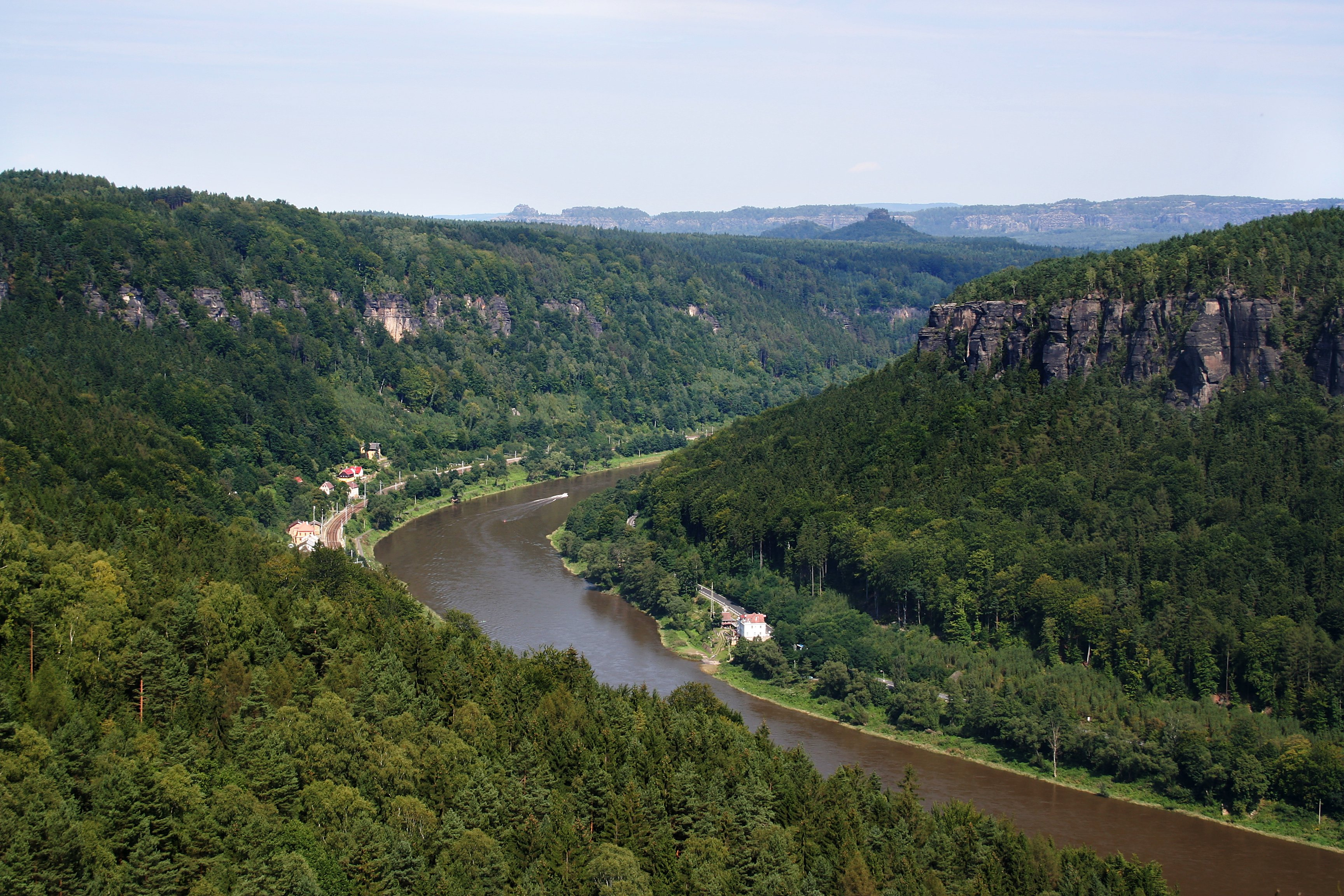
The Elbe valley in Bohemian Switzerland. The mountains on the horizon lie in Saxony.

=== Terrain ===
The most striking characteristic of this deeply dissected rocky mountain range is the extraordinary variety of terrain within the smallest area. Unique amongst the Central European Uplands are the constant changes between plains, ravines, table mountains and rocky regions with undeveloped areas of forest. This diversity is ecologically significant. The variety of different locations, each with its own conditions in terms of soil and microclimate, has produced an enormous richness of species. The numbers of ferns and mosses alone is unmatched by any other of the German central uplands.

The occurrence of Elbe sandstones and hence the Elbe Sandstone Mountains themselves is related to widespread deposition by a former sea in the Upper Cretaceous epoch. On the Saxon side of the border the term "Elbe Valley Cretaceous" is used, referring to a region stretching from Meißen-Oberau in the northwest through Dresden and Pirna into Saxon Switzerland, and which is formed by sandstones, planers and other rocks as well as basal conglomerates of older origin. Several erosion relics from Reinhardtsgrimma through Dippoldiswalde and the Tharandt Forest to Siebenlehn form isolated examples south of Dresden. They are mainly characterised by sandstones.
On the Bohemian side the sandstone beds continue and form part of the North Bohemian Cretaceous. The chalk sediments of the Zittau Basin are counted as part of the latter due to their regional-geological relationships. The sedimentary sequences of the Cretaceous sea continue across a wide area of the Czech Republic to Moravia. Together these beds form the Saxon-Bohemian Cretaceous Zone. In Czech geological circles, the Elbe Valley Cretaceous is described as the foothills of the Bohemian Cretaceous Basin.

=== Geology ===
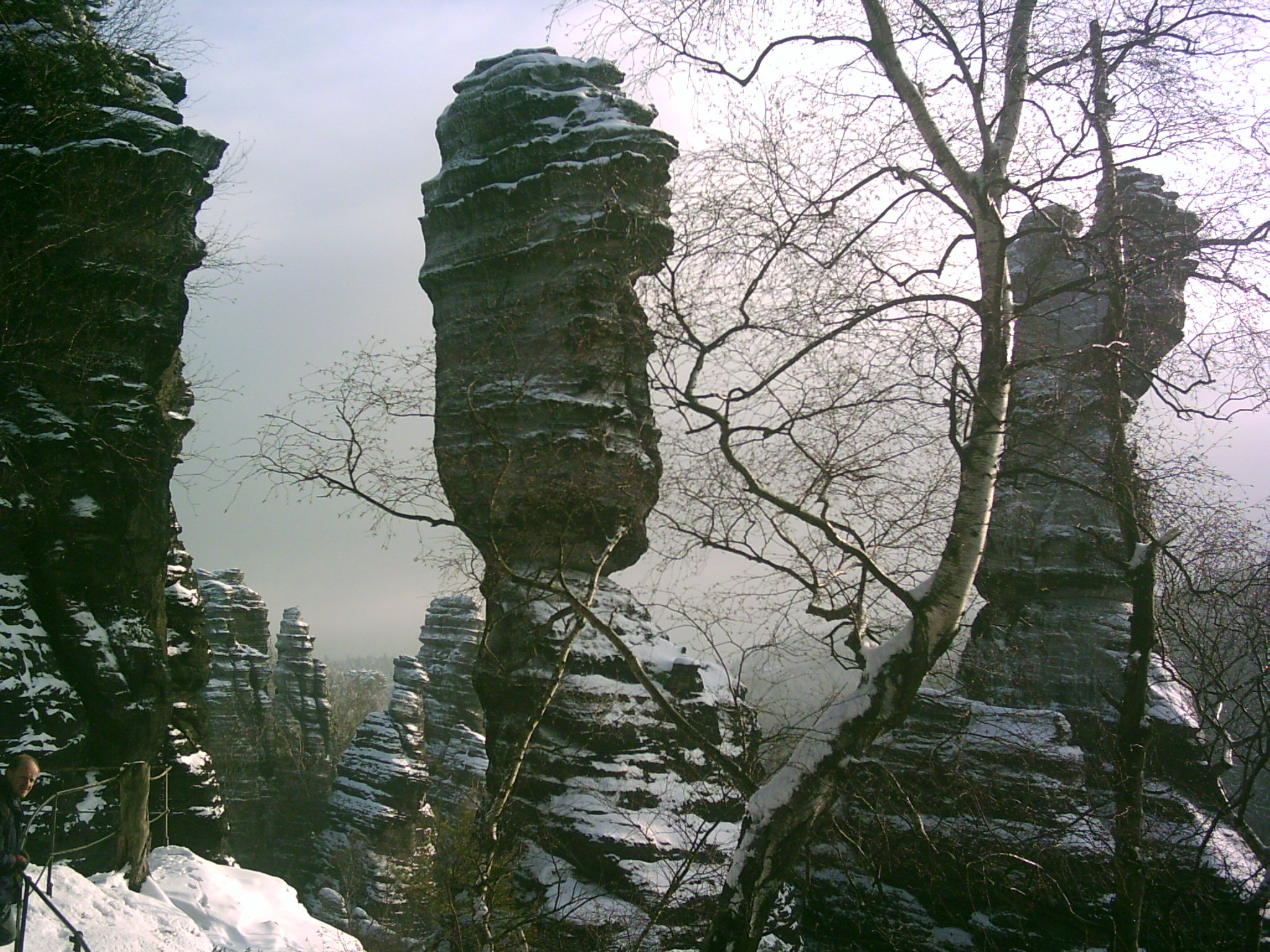
Hercules pillars in the Biela valley

The eroded sandstone landscape of this region was formed from depositions that accumulated on the bottom of the sea millions of years ago. Large rivers carried sand and other eroded debris into the Cretaceous sea. Rough quartz sand, clay and fine marl sank and became lithified layer by layer. A compact sandstone sequence developed, about 20 x 30 kilometres wide and up to 600 metres thick dating to the lower Cenomanian to Santonian stages. The tremendous variety of shapes in the sandstone landscape is a result of the subsequent chemical and physical erosion and biological processes acting on the rocks formed from those sands laid down during the Cretaceous Period.

The inlets of a Cretaceous sea, together with marine currents, carried away sand over a very long period of time into a shallow zone of the sea and then the diagenetic processes at differing pressure regimes resulted in the formation of sandstone beds. Its stratification is characterized by variations in the horizontal structure (deposits of clay minerals, grain sizes of quartz, differences in the grain-cement) as well as a typical but fairly small fossil presence and variably porous strata.

After the Cretaceous sea had retreated (marine regression), the surface of the land was shaped by weathering influences and watercourses, of which the Elbe made the deepest incision. Later the Lusatian granodiorite was uplifted over the 600 metre thick sandstone slab along the Lusatian Fault and pushed it downwards until it fractured. This northern boundary of the sandstone deposit lies roughly along the line Pillnitz–Hohnstein–Hinterhermsdorf–Krásná Lípa.

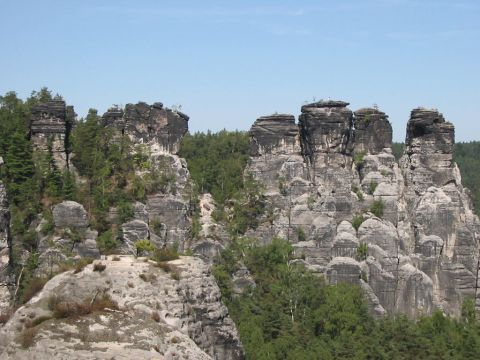
Crags near Rathen

In the Tertiary period, the adjacent region of the Central Bohemian Uplands and the Lusatian Mountains was shaped and affected by intense volcanism; but individual intrusions of magma also forced their way through the sandstone platform of the Elbe Sandstone Mountains. The most striking evidence of this phase in the earth's history are the conical basaltic hills of Růžovský vrch, Cottaer Spitzberg and Raumberg, but also Großer and Kleiner Winterberg.

At its southwestern edge the sandstone plate was uplifted by over 200 metres at the Karsdorf Fault, whereby the slab was tilted even more and increased the gradient of the Elbe River. The water masses cut valleys into the rock with their streambeds and contributed in places to the formation of the rock faces. Over time the gradients reduced, the streambed of the Elbe widened out and changed its course time and again, partly as a result of the climatic influences of the ice ages.

The mineral composition of the sandstone beds has a direct effect on the morphology of the terrain. The fine-grained form with clayey-silty cement between the quartz grains causes banks and slopes with terracing. The beds of sandstone with siliceous cement are typically the basis of the formation of rock faces and crags. Small variations in the cement composition of the rock can have a visible impact on the landscape.

Elbe Sandstone gets its characteristic cuboid appearance from its thick horizontal strata (massive bedding) and its vertical fissures. In 1839 Bernhard Cotta wrote about this in his comments on the geognostic map: "Vertical fissures and cracks cut through, often virtually at right angles, the horizontal layers and, as a result, parallelepiped bodies are formed, that have given rise to the description Quader Sandstone.". Quader is German for an ashlar or block of stone, hence the name "Square Sandstone" is also used in English.

The term Quader Sandstone Mountains or Square Sandstone Mountains, introduced by Hanns Bruno Geinitz in 1849, is an historical, geological term for similar sandstone deposits, but was also used in connection with the Elbe Sandstone Mountains.

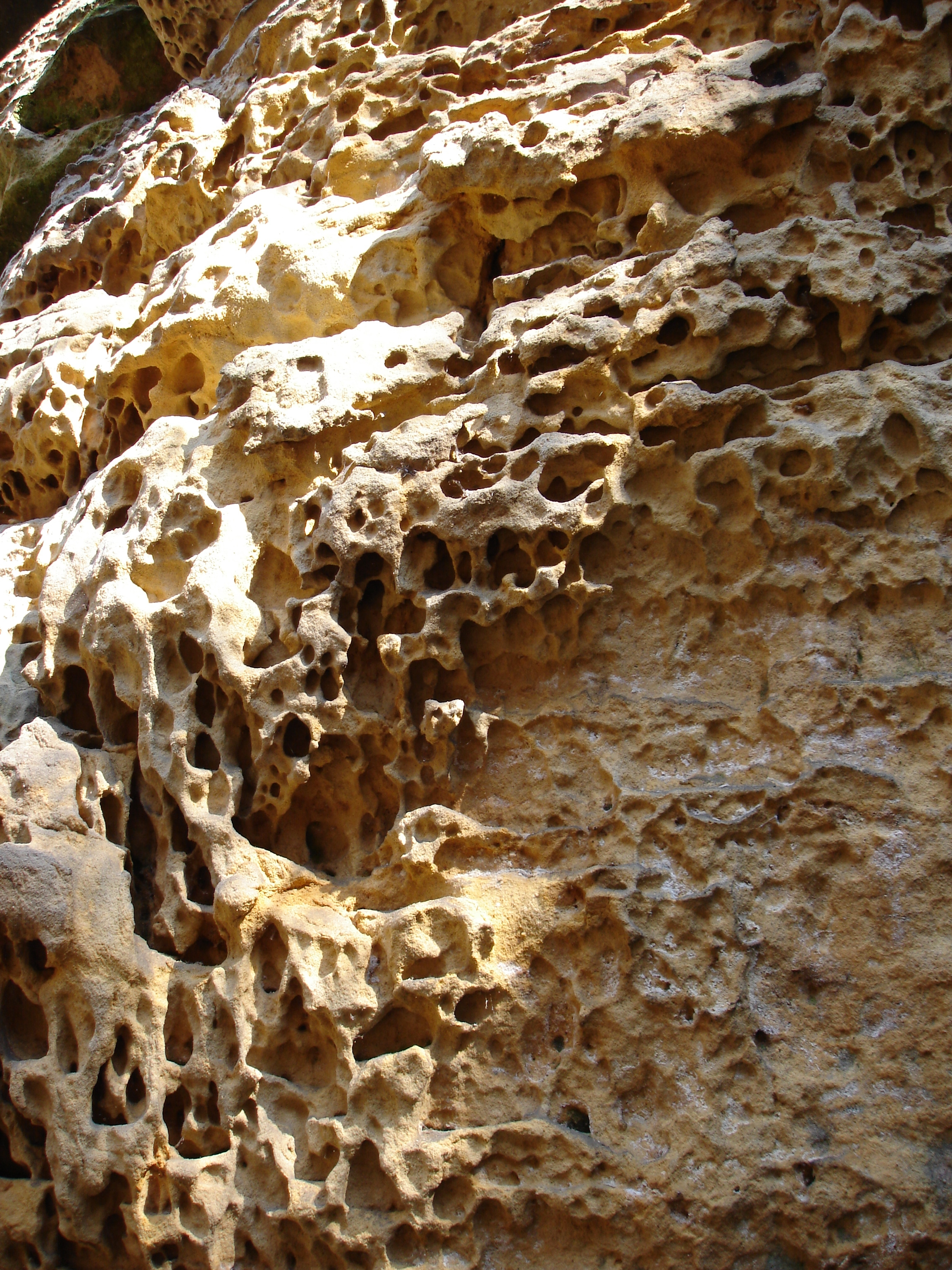
Honeycomb weathering

The fissures were formed as a result of long-term tectonic stresses on the entire sandstone platform of the mountain range. This network of clefts runs through the sandstone beds in a relatively regular way, but in different directions in two regions of the range. Subsequent weathering processes of very different forms and simultaneous complex deposition (leaching, frost and salt wedging, wind, solution weathering with sintering as well as biogenic and microbial effects) have further changed the nature of the rock surface. For example, collapse caves, small hole-like cavities (honeycomb weathering) with hourglass-shaped pillars, chimneys, crevices and mighty, rugged rock faces.

Many morphological formations in the rocky landscape of the Elbe Sandstone Mountains are suspected to have been formed as a consequence of karstification. Important indicators of such processes in the polygenetic and polymorphic erosion landscape of the Elbe Sandstone Mountains are the furrows with parallel ridges between them (grykes and clints) that look like cart ruts and which are particularly common, as well as extensive cave systems. They are occasionally described by the term pseudokarst. The application of the concept to several erosion formations in the sandstone of this mountain range is however contentious. Czech geologists have identified in quartzite-cemented sandstone areas in the northern part of the Bohemian Cretaceous Basin, karst features in the shape of spherical caverns and cave formations. According to them, these emerged as a result of solution processes by water in complex interactions with iron compounds from neighbouring or intrusive magmatic-volcanic rocks. The variation in relief in these sandstone regions is explained on the basis of these processes. The Elbe Sandstone Mountains are the greatest cretaceous sandstone erosion complex in Europe.

Human-induced changes caused by nearly 1,000 years of continual sandstone quarrying have also contributed in parts of the sandstone highlands to the appearance of the landscape today. The fissures (called Loose by the quarrymen) played an important role here, because they provided in effect natural divisions in the rock that were helpful when demolishing a rock face or when dressing the rough blocks of stone.

The sandstone of this region is a sought-after building material used for example, for imposing city edifices such as the Church of Our Lady in Dresden.

== Conservation ==
Large parts of the Elbe Sandstone Mountains are under statutory protection. In Germany there is the national park region of Saxon Switzerland, which consists two elements: Saxon Switzerland National Park itself, founded in 1990 and covered an area of 93 km²; and the protected area surrounding it that was founded in 1956 and covers 287 km². The German part of the range was also designated in May 2006 as one of the 77 most important national geotopes in Germany by the Academy of Geosciences in Hanover.

In the Bohemian part of the range there has been a protected landscape area in the northeastern region since 1972 called the Elbe Sandstone Protected Landscape Area with an area of 324 km^{2}. In 2000, Bohemian Switzerland National Park was established with an area of 79 km^{2}, bringing around 700 km^{2} of the range under protection as a natural and cultural landscape.

== Tourism ==
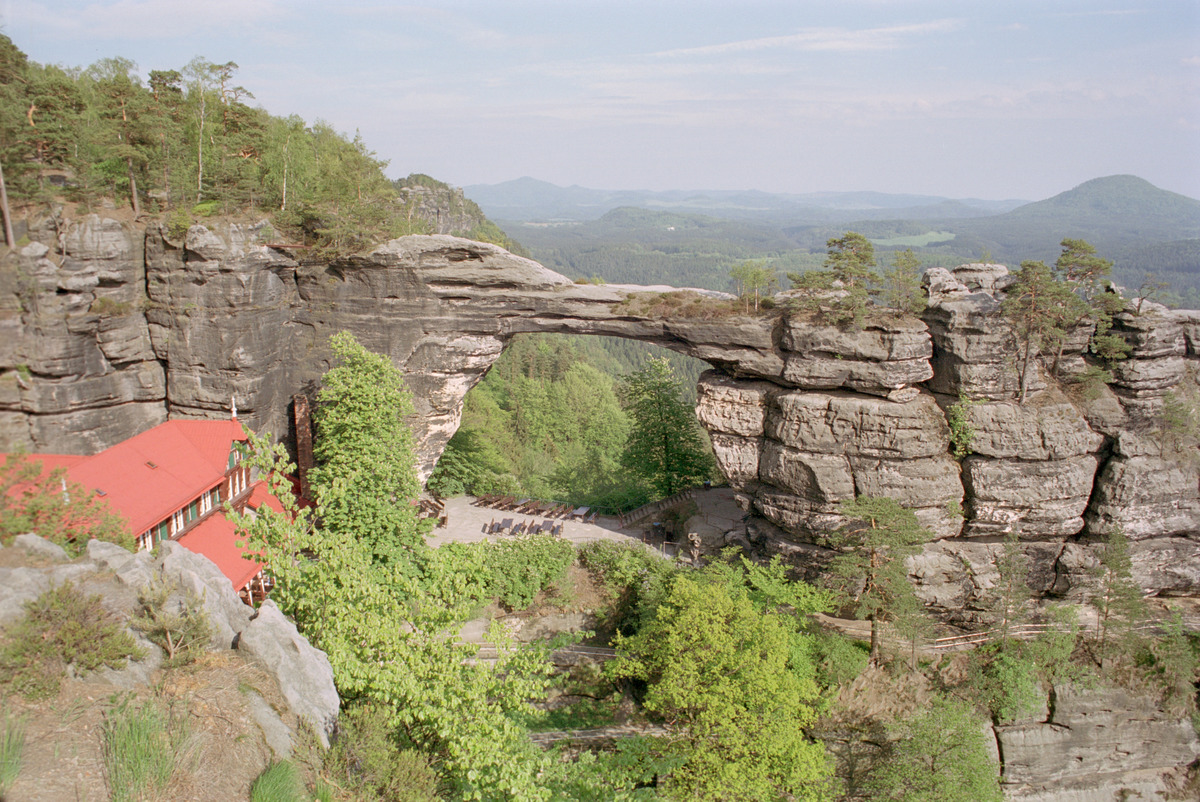
The Pravčická brána, a natural sandstone arch in Bohemian Switzerland

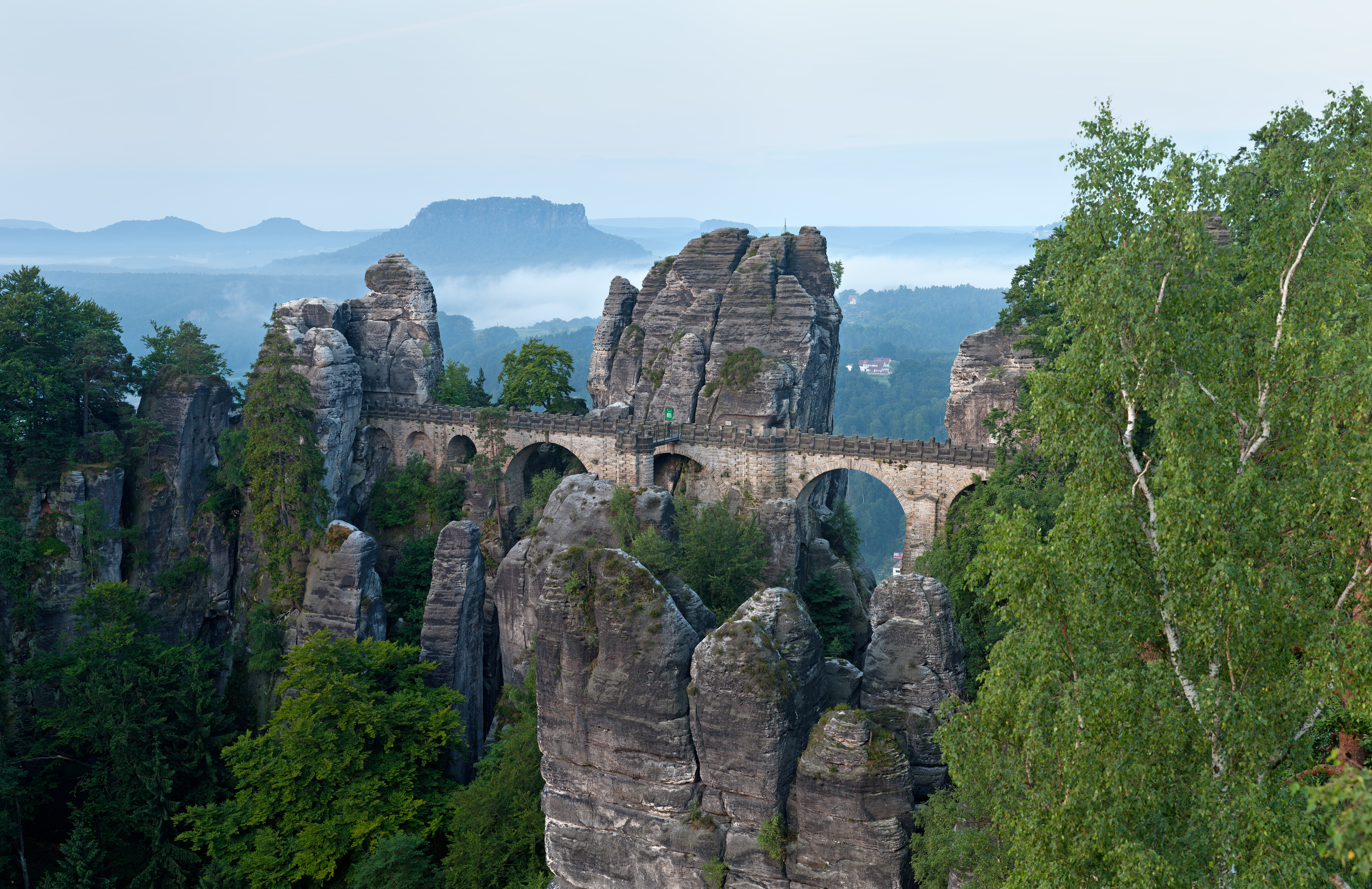
The Bastei bridge in Saxon Switzerland

The Elbe Sandstone mountains have been a popular destination for tourists for more than 200 years, and for climbers for more than 100 years. It is also a popular recreation area for the nearby Saxon capital Dresden. Places of interest include the Bastei cliffs near Rathen, the Königstein Fortress, Pravčická brána, the Schrammsteine, Pfaffenstein, and the valleys of the Kirnitzsch and Kamenice rivers. There are some 14,000 climbing routes via which mountain climbers can conquer 1100 free-standing peaks. Visitors can experience the natural scenes on the asphalt Elbe cycle path, or on board a steam paddleboat that is part of the oldest fleet of its kind in the world.

The Elbe Sandstone Mountains have numerous facilities for cure and rehabilitation. The discovery of ferrous and sulphurous sources in Bad Schandau in 1730 led to its development as a health resort and the building of swimming baths.

== See also ==
- List of mountains and hills of the Elbe Sandstone Mountains
- List of regions of Saxony
