= Biela Valley Trolleybus =

Overview
- Native name: Bielatalbahn

Technical
- Line length: 4.4 km
- Electrification: 500 Volts DC
- Operating speed: 12 km/h max.
- Maximum incline: 0.125 %

The Biela Valley Trolleybus (German: Bielatalbahn or Bielathalbahn) was a trolleybus service in the German state of Saxony. The facility opened on 10 July 1901 and had closed again by September 1904. It was one of the first trolleybus operations in the world. The 4.4-kilometre route was also known at the time as the Gleislose Bahn or "trackless railway" – its full name being Gleislose Bielathal-Motorbahn mit elektrischer Oberleitung ("Trackless Biela Valley Motor Line with Electric Overhead Cable"). It was operated by the firm of Bielathal-Motorbahn Königstein and served the lower valley of the Biela in Saxon Switzerland. The route linked Königstein on the Elbe with the then-independent village of Hütten. The terminus was at Kurbad Königsbrunn.

== See also ==
- List of trolleybus systems in Germany
