= Kuhstall (Saxon Switzerland) =

Second largest natural arch

Coordinates: 50°55′33.56″N 14°15′23.81″E

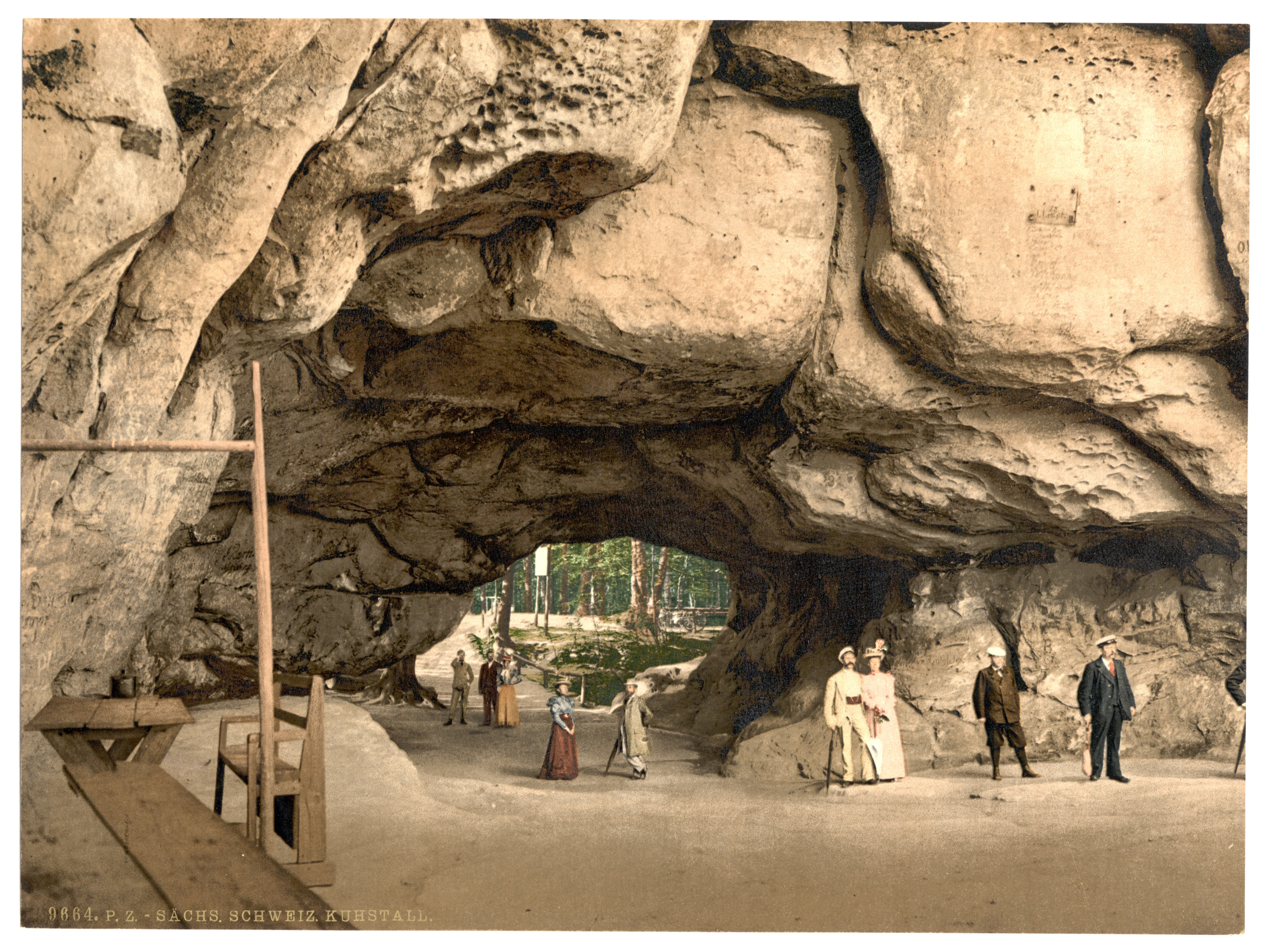
Tourists at the Kuhstall (around 1900)

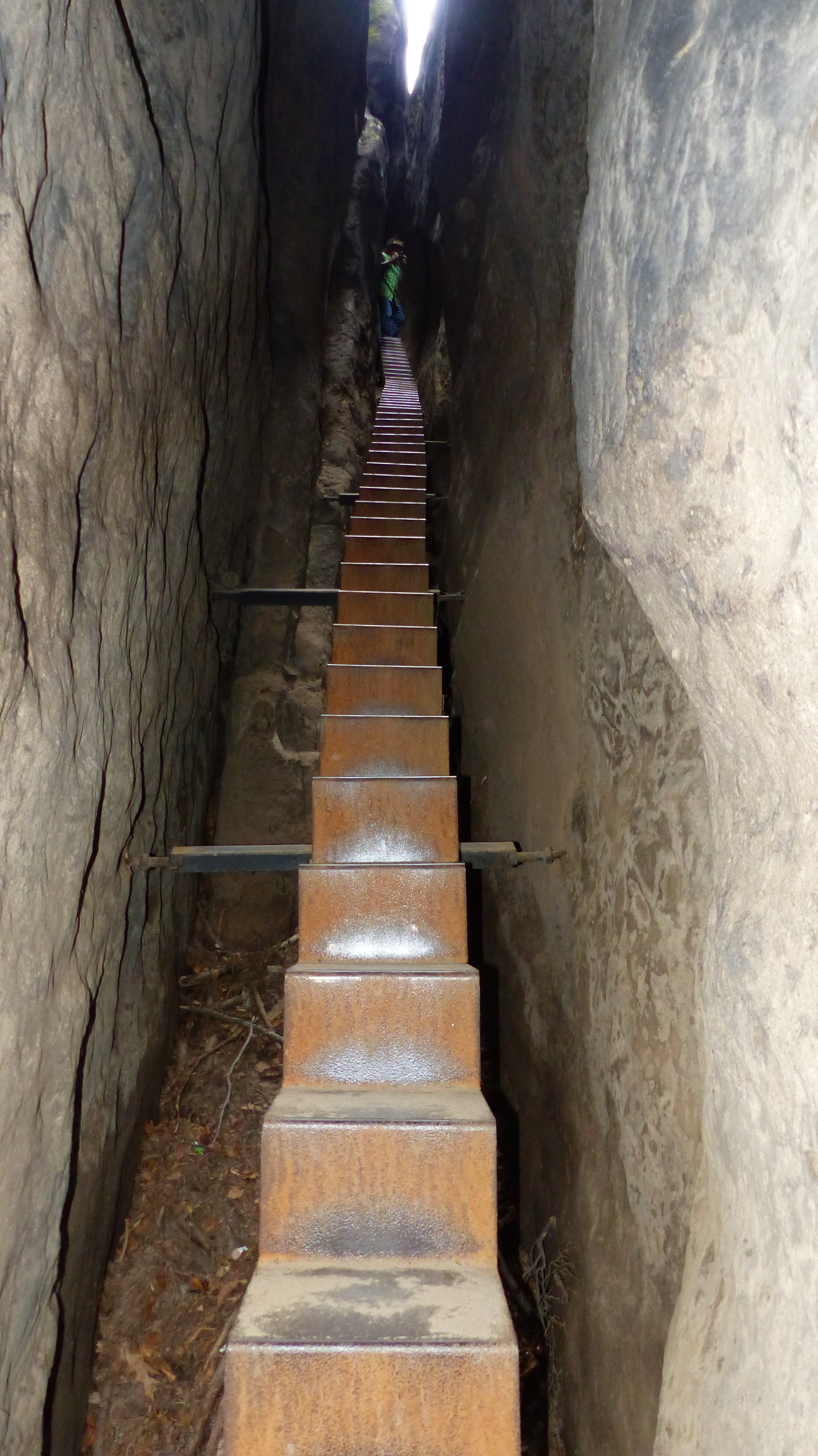
View up the Himmelsleiter

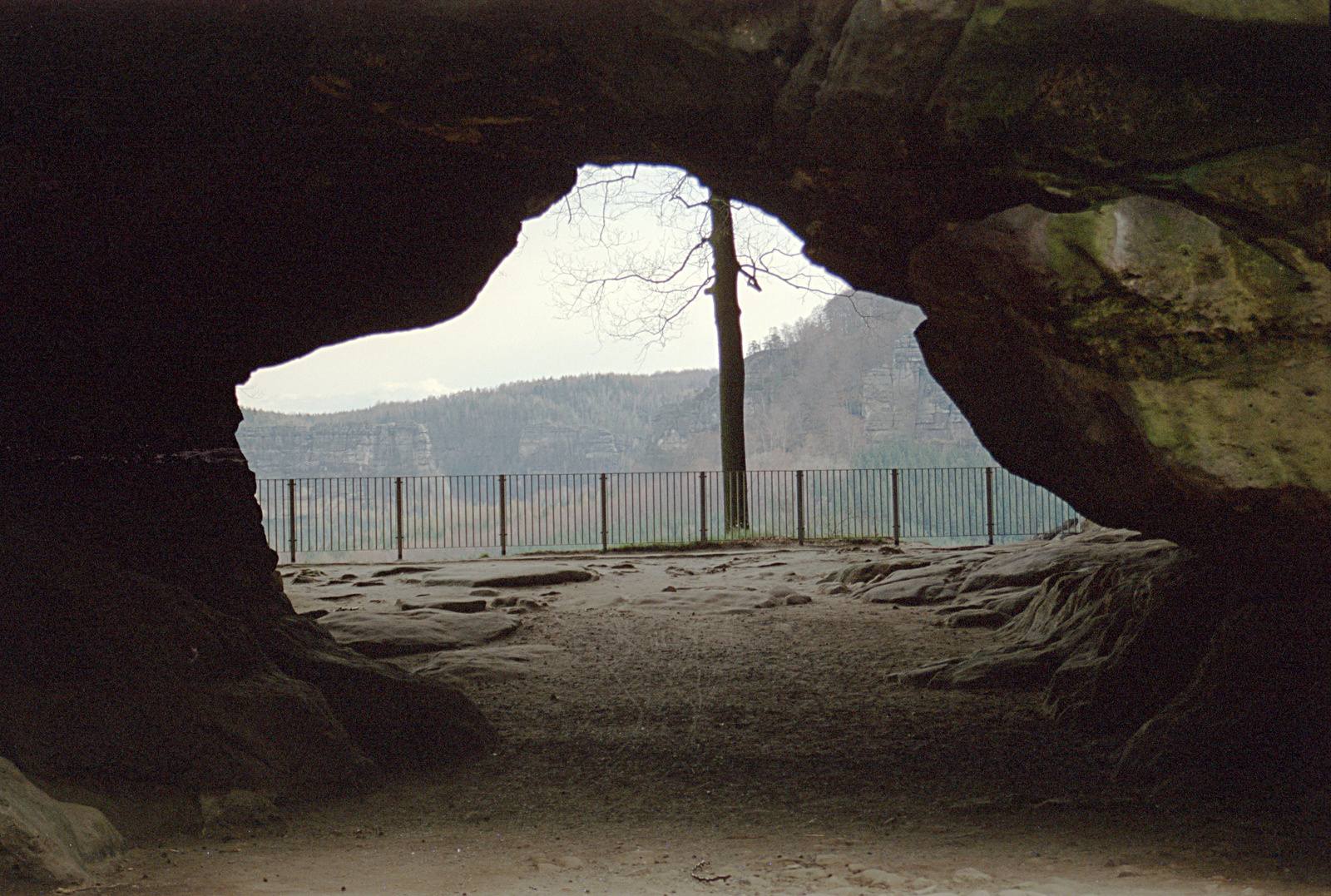
View through the Kuhstall

The Kuhstall (Czech: Kraví hora) is the second largest natural arch in the Elbe Sandstone Mountains after the Pravčická brána. It is located on the Neuer Wildenstein, a 337 m high rock outcrop in the hinterland of Saxon Switzerland, south of the Lichtenhain Waterfall and above the Kirnitzsch valley. It is crowned by the 15th-century castle of Wildenstein. The arch is 11 metres high, 17 metres wide and 24 metres deep.

== Name ==
The name Kuhstall has two possible origins. The first posit is that the local population hid their cattle in the very wide natural archway from marauding Swedish soldiers during the Thirty Years' War. The second is that the occupants of the medieval castle, that towards the end became a haven for robber knights, kept the cattle here that they had stolen during their raids.

The first developer of Saxon Switzerland, Wilhelm Lebrecht Götzinger, suggested that the natural arch should be called the Wildenstein Rock Hall (Wildensteiner Felsenhalle) instead of the traditional and folksy Kuhstall, but was not able to prevail. From the time when the area was first developed for tourism, there are many old inscriptions, that have been written on the walls and roof of the Kuhstall with soot and paint or scratched into the rock.

== Geology ==
The rock fenster lies on a clay-containing, intermediate layer. On the boundary walls is smooth polished, petrified rock. The cause was tectonic movements of the Lusatian Fault, about 900 metres away; here during the Cretaceous era, the older granite was pushed over the younger sandstones.

The rock massif has numerous caves and overhangs, some with legendary names like Schneiderloch and Wochenbett.

== Tourism ==
In the early 19th century the Kuhstall developed into one of the main attractions of Saxon Switzerland. It was an important station along the Malerweg or Artists' Way. August von Goethe visited the rocks in June 1819 and reported: "a friendly hospitality with beer, strawberries, lemonade and rum made this spot a place of rest for the hungry and tired body."

Since 1824 there has been a mountain inn by the rock arch that has been rebuilt and extended several times. With the opening of the Kirnitzschtal Tramway to the Lichtenhain Waterfall in 1898 the Kuhstall has been even more accessible.

In 1837 Helmina von Chezy made an entry in the guest book at the Kuhstall whilst on holiday which translates loosely as follows: "Here, where beautiful nature enchants and enthralls us, terrible jokes are scrawled that appal us." And reaps a reply along the lines of: "Aye, Mrs von Chezy, with her verses so sleazy. Ad. v. Th., 27 July 1837."

Even today the Kuhstall is a popular family destination. From the observation terrace south of the arch the climbing areas of the hinter Saxon Switzerland are visible over a wide panorama. Above the Kuhstall are the ruins of the former castle, accessible through the narrow rock tunnel of the Himmelsleiter.

On Bohemian engraved glass the Kuhstall is one of the most popular motifs of Saxon Switzerland.
