= Gerhart Kraaz =

German artist and illustrator

Gerhart Kraaz (1909–1971) was a German artist and illustrator.

Gerhart Kraaz was born in Berlin in 1909 and died in Königstein in 1971.
