= Kleiner Winterberg =

Kleiner Winterberg may refer to the following mountains in Germany:

- Kleiner Winterberg (Harz), a mountain and subpeak of the Wurmberg in the Harz Mountains, Saxony-Anhalt
- Kleiner Winterberg (Saxon Switzerland), a hill in Saxon Switzerland, in the Elbe Sandstone Mountains, Saxony
