= Saxon-Bohemian Chalk Sandstone Region =

Natural region in south Saxony

The Saxon-Bohemian Chalk Sandstone Region (German: Sächsisch-Böhmische Kreidesandsteingebiet) is a natural region in south Saxony on the southern border with the Czech Republic.

== Description and location ==
It forms part of the northern perimeter of the Bohemian Massif and comprises Saxon Switzerland, the German part of the Elbe Sandstone Mountains and the Zittau Hills, a small section of the Lusatian Mountains on German soil. Because the boundary between the Elbe Sandstone Mountains and the Lusatian Uplands is on Czech territory, the two natural regions are physically separated.

At the beginning of the 21st century, the working group for Ecological Balance and Regional Character in the Saxon Academy of Sciences in Leipzig grouped all mountain and hill areas in the Saxon-Bohemian border region into a single geographical unit known as the Saxon Highlands and Uplands. This includes the Lusatian Mountains sandwiched between the Zittau Hills and Saxon Switzerland, which had been grouped by Meynen with the loess landscapes to the east and west into the natural region of Upper Lusatia; to the west the new major unit merges into the Ore Mountains and the Vogtland.

The Lusatian Mountains are not, however, built of chalk sandstone, but descend northwards and form the eastern part of the Saxon Uplands together with the 'real' chalk sandstone region.

== Sub-divisions ==
The Saxon-Bohemian Chalk Sandstone Region, according to Meynen, was divided as follows (in brackets: natural regions according to the BfN):

- 43 (=D15) Saxon-Bohemian Chalk Sandstone Region (in its widest sense)
  - 430 Saxon Switzerland
  - 431 Zittau Hills
  - (441 Lusatian Mountains)

== See also ==
- Saxon Highlands and Uplands
- Natural regions of Germany

== General sources ==
- BfN
  - Map services
  - Landscape fact files:
    - Saxon Switzerland (excluding the Elbe Valley)
    - Upper Elbe Valley
    - Zittau Mountains
    - (Lusatian Uplands)

== Literature ==
- Meynen, Emil (ed.): Handbuch der naturräumlichen Gliederung Deutschlands. Selbstverlag der Bundesanstalt für Landeskunde, Remagen 1953-1962 (Teil 1, enthält Lieferung 1-5), ISBN B0000BJ19E
- Meynen, Emil (ed.): Handbuch der naturräumlichen Gliederung Deutschlands. Selbstverlag der Bundesanstalt für Landeskunde, Remagen 1959-1962 (Teil 2, enthält Lieferung 6-9), ISBN B0000BJ19F
