= Saxon Switzerland =

Hilly natural area in Saxony, Germany

Coordinates: 50°56′N 14°12′E

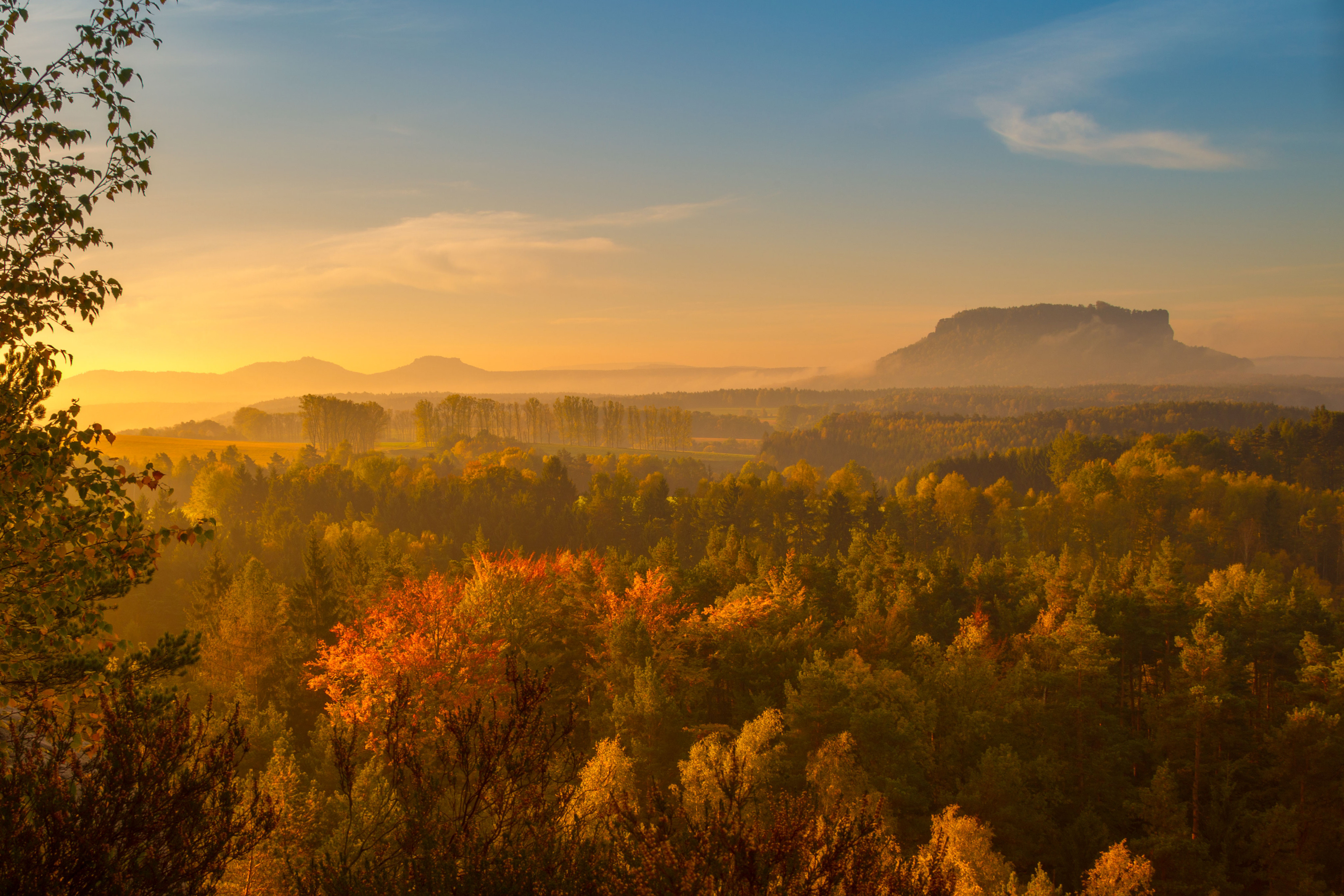
- View of the Lilienstein in Saxon Switzerland View of the Lilienstein in Saxon Switzerland
- Native name: Sächsische Schweiz
- Natural region: Elbe Sandstone Mountains

Natural region characteristics
- Landscape type: Landscape
- Highest point: Großer Zschirnstein (562 m)
- Settlements: Pirna, Bad Schandau, Sebnitz, Rathen
- County/District: Sächsische Schweiz-Osterzgebirge
- State(s): Saxony
- Country: Germany

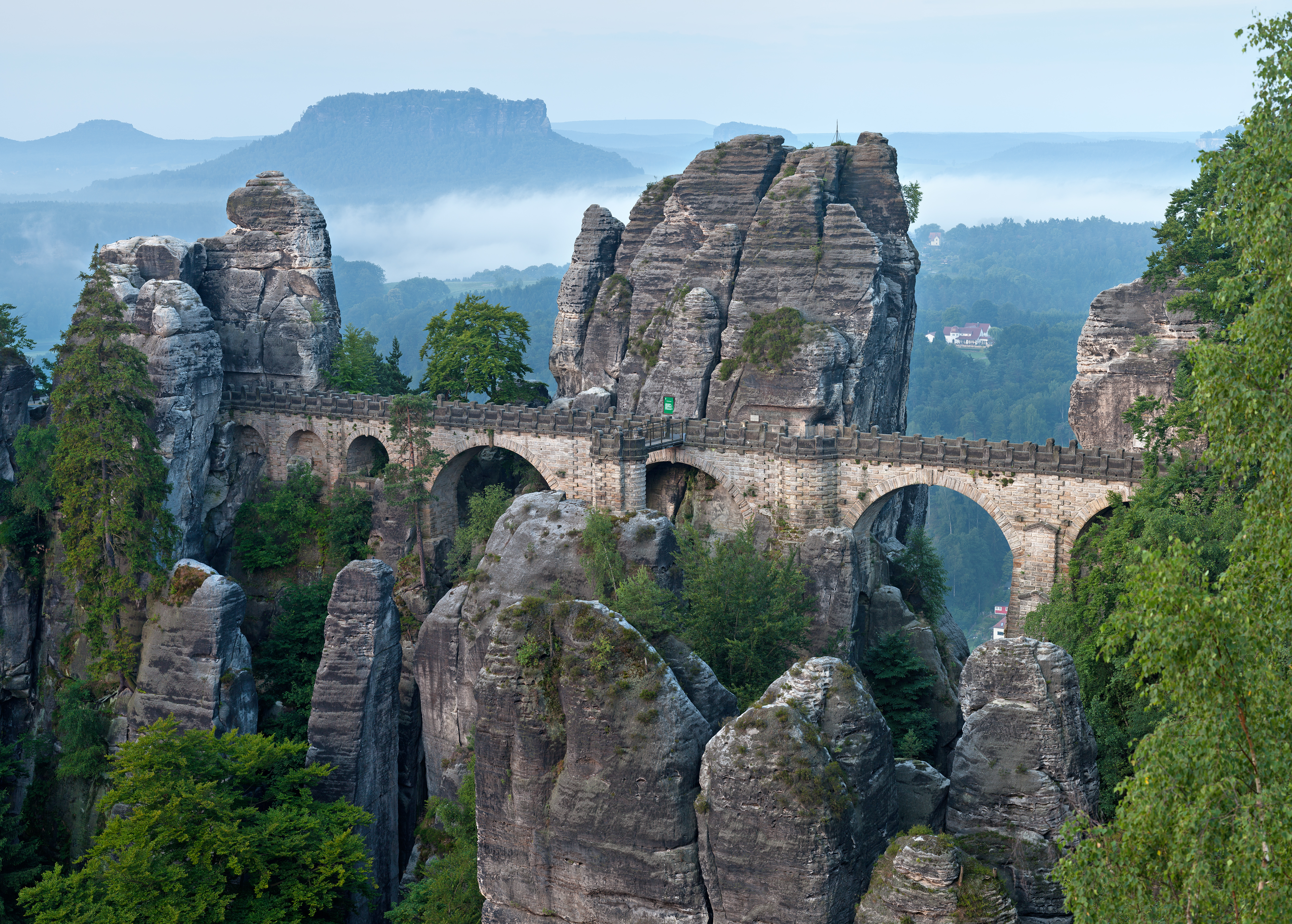
Bastei bridge in Saxon Switzerland

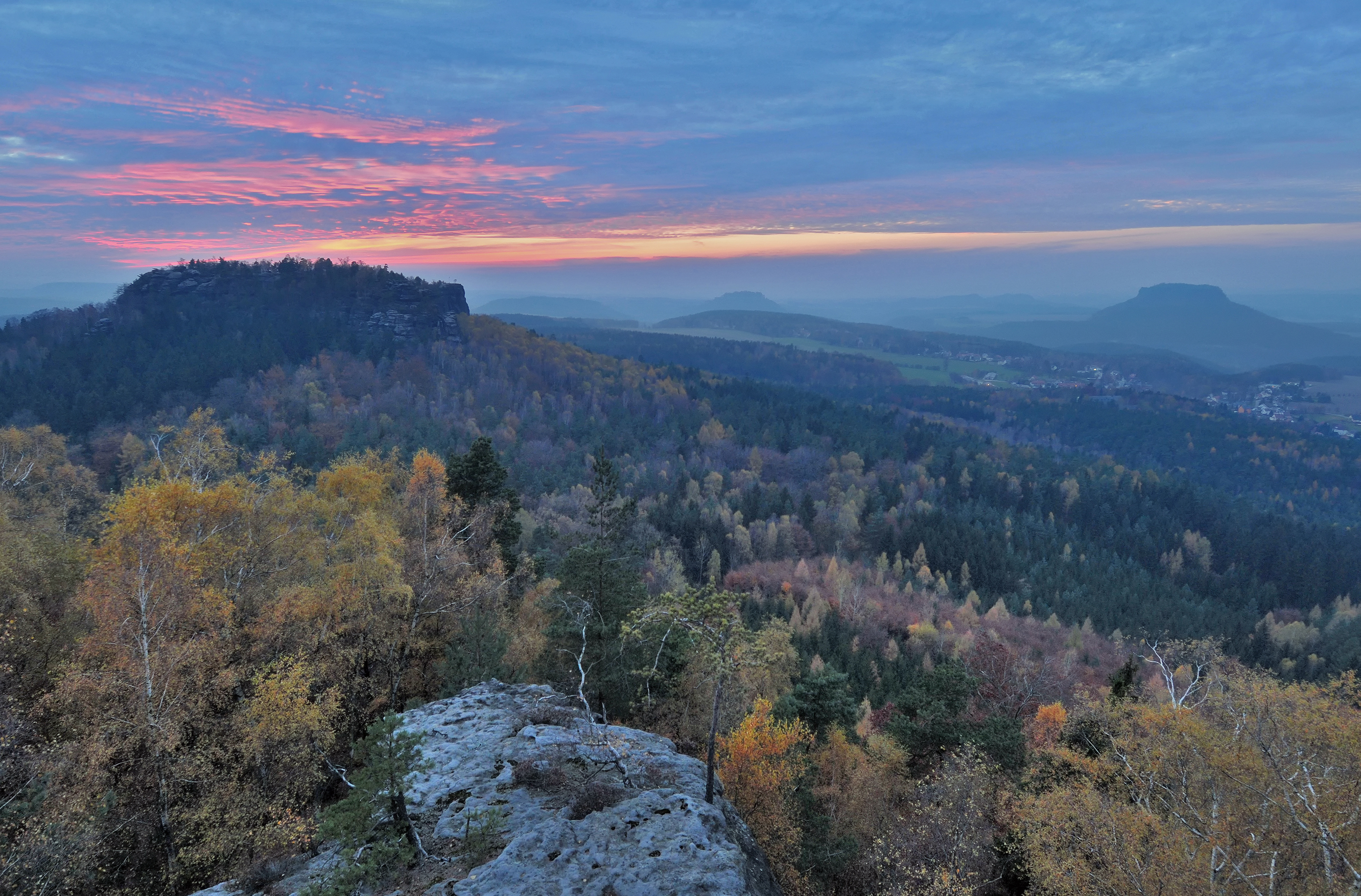
Sunset in Saxon Switzerland from the top of the Papststein. The three large hills are Gohrisch (l), the Königstein Fortress (c) and the Lilienstein (r).

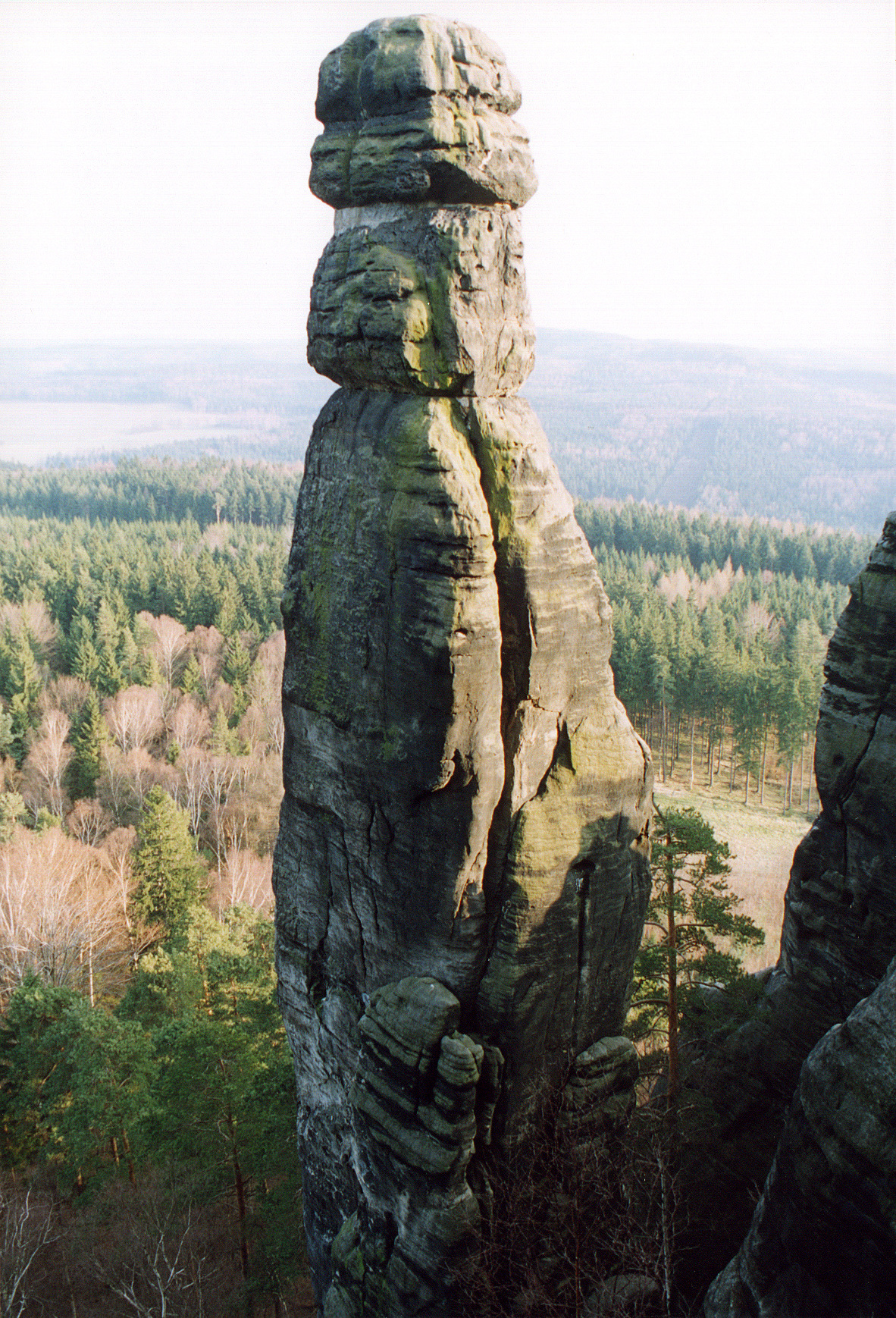
The Barbarine at Pfaffenstein

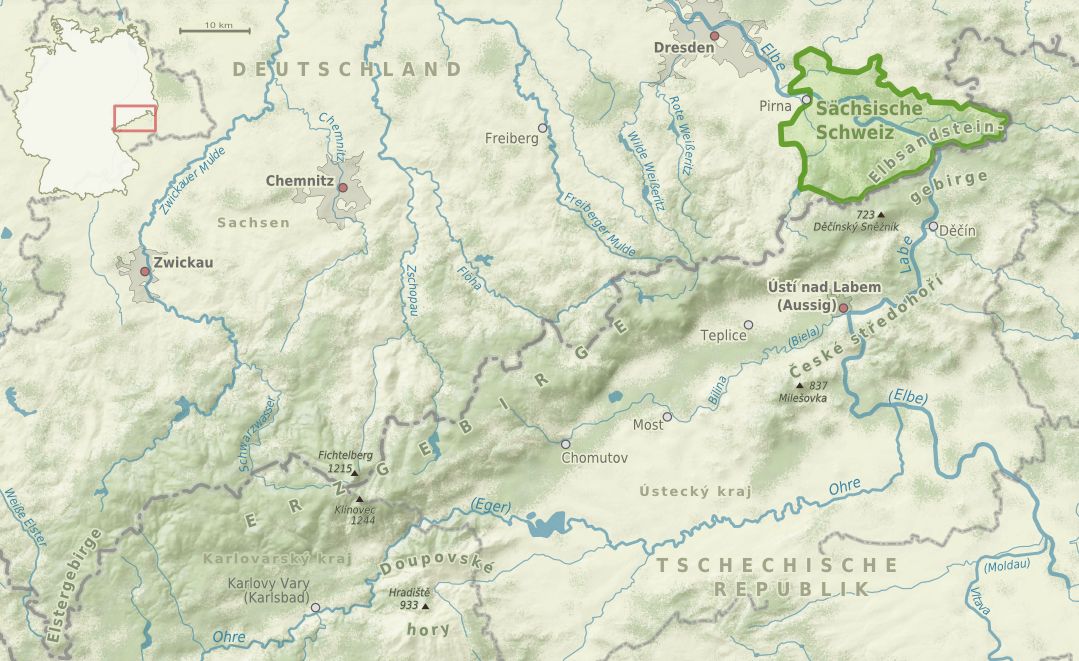
Physical map of Saxon Switzerland

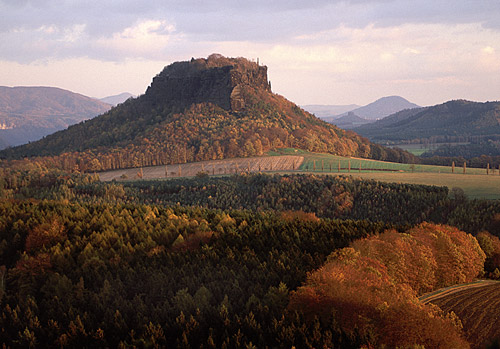
The Lilienstein at dusk

Saxon Switzerland (German: Sächsische Schweiz, pronounced [ˈzɛksɪʃə ˈʃvaɪts]) is a hilly climbing area and national park in the Elbe Sandstone Mountains. It is located around the Elbe valley south-east of Dresden in Saxony, Germany, adjoining Bohemian Switzerland in the Czech Republic. Together with the Czech part, the region is known as Saxon-Bohemian Switzerland.

The administrative district for the area is Sächsische Schweiz-Osterzgebirge. The fortress of Königstein is a well-known landmark.

== Etymology ==
The German name for Saxon Switzerland, Sächsische Schweiz, appeared in the 18th century. Two Swiss artists, Adrian Zingg and Anton Graff, were appointed in 1766 to the Dresden Academy of Art.

From their new, adopted home they look eastwards and saw, about a day's walk away, a hill range. It had a strange, flattish profile, without any actual summits […]

— according to Lothar Kempe

They felt the landscape was reminiscent of their homeland, the Swiss Jura, and reported in their exchange of letters on the difference between their homeland and "Saxon Switzerland". Previously, the Saxon part of the Elbe Sandstone Mountains had merely been referred to as the Meißner Hochland, Meißen Oberland or Heide über Schandau.

The description became popular through the publication of the name by Wilhelm Lebrecht Götzinger. In his books he described the area as Saxon Switzerland and made the term known to a wide audience.

In English the usual translation is "Saxon Switzerland". However other sources call it "Saxony Switzerland" or even "Swiss Saxony".

== Geography ==
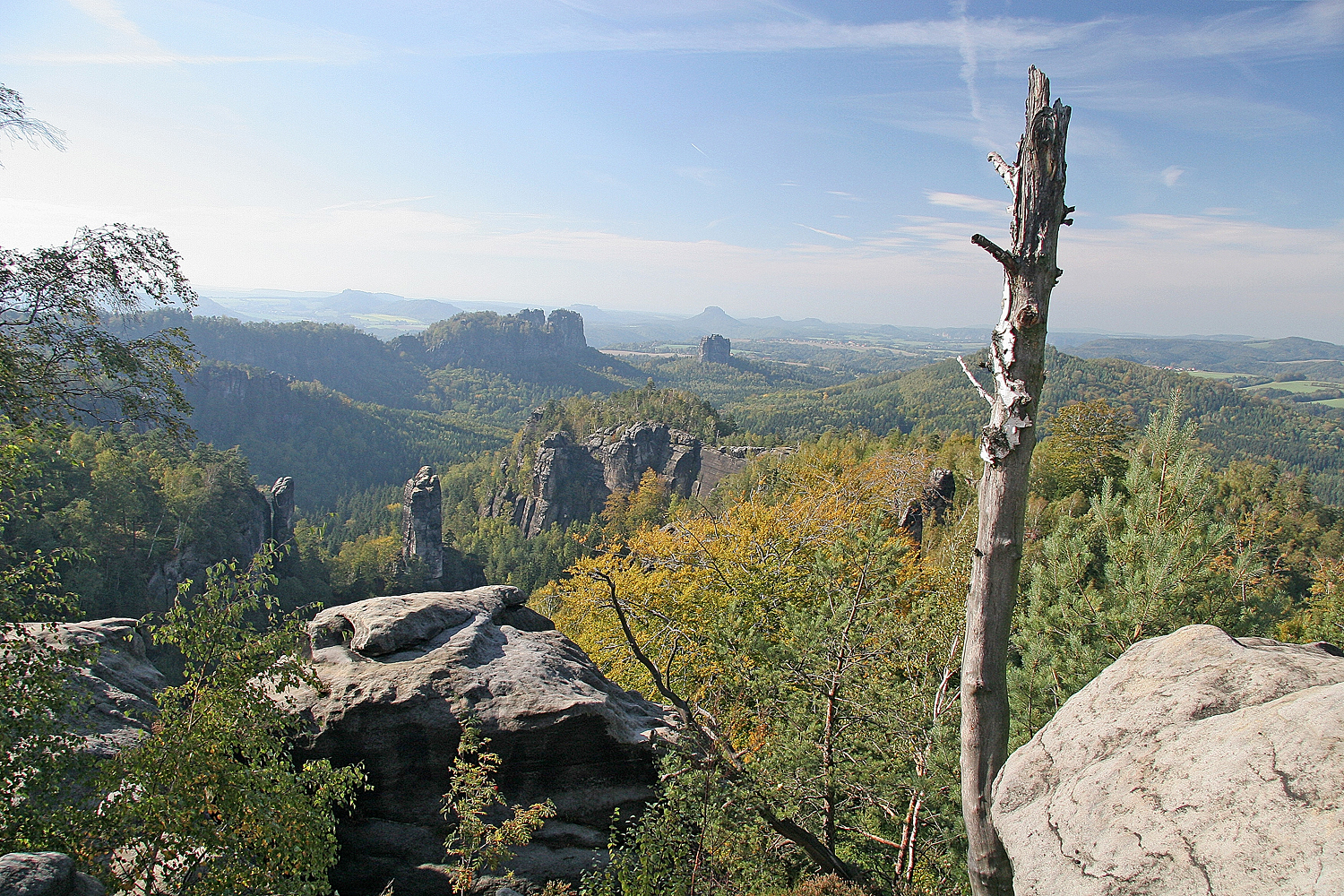
View from Carolafelsen into the Elbe Sandstone Mountains

Saxon Switzerland forms the northern part of the Elbe Sandstone Mountains range, located on the German-Czech border. To the east, it transitions into the Lusatian Highlands and, to the west, into the Ore Mountains. The Czech part of the Elbe Sandstone Mountains is partly formed by the Bohemian Switzerland national park. The highest elevation in Saxon Switzerland is the Großer Zschirnstein at 562 m above sea level.

=== Natural region classification ===
In the classification of natural regions by Emil Meynen, Saxon Switzerland was a major unit (430) within the Saxon-Bohemian Chalk Sandstone Region (main unit group 43), whose only other major unit on German soil was the Zittau Mountains. The boundary between the two mountain ranges, the Elbe Sandstone Mountains and the Lusatian Mountains, is located on Czech territory, which is why these natural regions are geographically separated from one another.

The Ecosystem and Regional Character working group of the Saxon Academy of Sciences in Leipzig has now, at the beginning of the 21st century, grouped all ranges in the Saxon-Bohemian border region into the super unit Saxon Highlands and Uplands (Sächsisches Bergland und Mittelgebirge). The Lusatian Mountains between Saxon Switzerland and the Zittau Mountains also belong to it, whereas Meynen had grouped it with the loess hill country to the north and east into the major unit of Upper Lusatia (Oberlausitz); to the west the new super unit is continued by the main unit groups of the Ore Mountains and Vogtland.

=== Geological formation ===
See Elbe Sandstone Mountains (Geology section)

=== Hills ===
As a rule, two types of hill may be distinguished.

Numerous rock formations in the Elbe Sandstone Mountains, in both Saxon Switzerland and Bohemian Switzerland, are known locally in this region as Steine ("rocks"). Prominent examples are the Königstein, the Lilienstein, the Gohrisch and the Papststein. This description does not, however, include the dome-shaped Kuppen such as the Waitzdorfer Höhe or the Großer Winterberg, whose bedrock is made of volcanic basalt or granitic material.

The Cretaceous sandstone formations soar above the so-called "levels" of their surrounding area, the former level of the River Elbe, and represent the remains of an old peneplain. In the course of the Late Tertiary, uplifting of the Ore Mountains and sideways pressure from the Lusatian Highlands shattered the sandstone plate along lines that intersected like a grid and this, combined with the simultaneously increasing stream velocity of the Elbe and regressive erosion in its side valleys, offered new lines of attack and new routes for the destructive power of water. Initially the larger table hills (Lilienstein), or those already deeply fissured like Zirkelstein, Kaiserkrone or already forested (Kohlbornstein), remained, but these too broke up later as a result of erosive destruction into long ridges (Schrammsteine) or even into individual rock pinnacles (Torwächter). Morphologically harder sections of strata, that resisted karstification longer and more successfully, generally form the uppermost layers. The collapse of rock structures is usually therefore a result of erosion from below or from the flanks.

== History ==
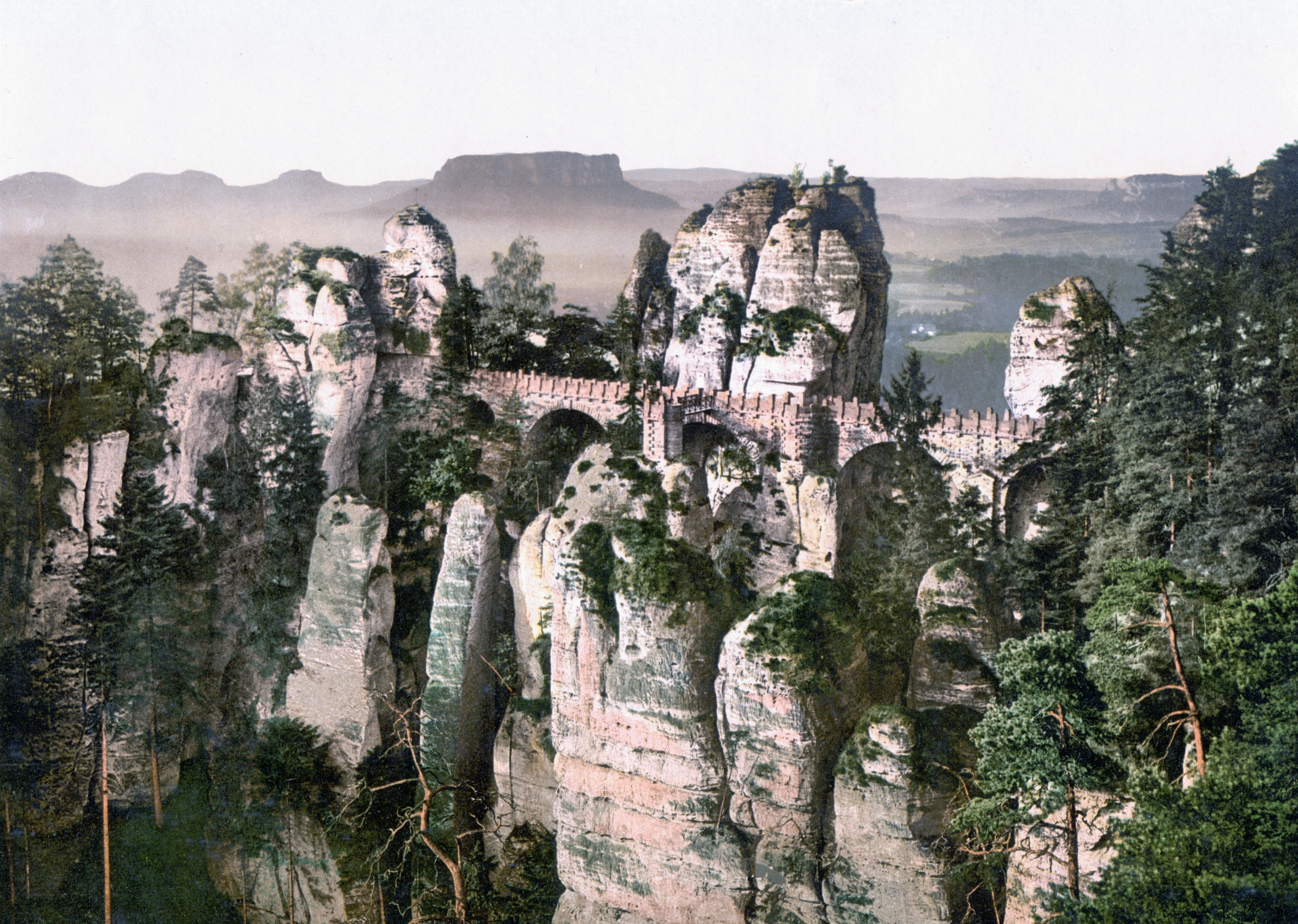
The Bastei c. 1900

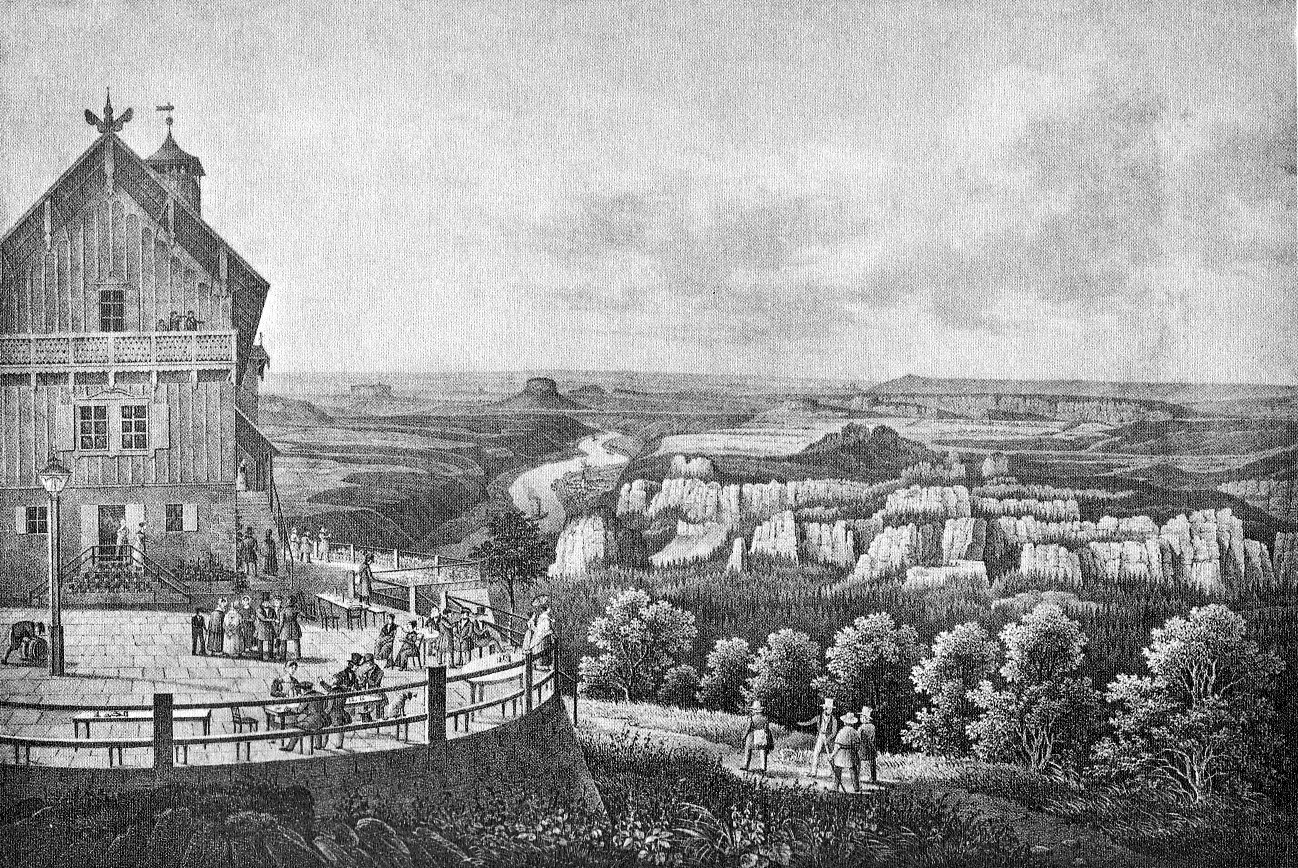
View from the Winterberg c. 1850

During the early Mediaeval period, the region was settled by Slavs and was part of the Kingdom of Bohemia during the Middle Ages. About 1000 years ago Bohemian-Saxon Switzerland was the borderland of three Slavic tribes. The Nisane tribe (east of the Elbe from Dresden to Pirna), the Milzane tribe (from today's Upper Lusatia) and in the south the Dacine tribe shaped the political and economic landscape at that time.

It was not until the 15th century that the area now called Saxon Switzerland came under Saxon hegemony when it became part of the Margraviate of Meissen with boundaries roughly corresponding to those of today.

The development of the area for tourism began in earnest in the 19th century. This was greatly helped by the building of one of the first trolleybus lines in the world: the Biela Valley Trolleybus, which was in operation from 1901 to 1904 and was operated from Königstein.

Romantic artists were inspired by the beauty of wilderness, like the painter Ludwig Richter or the composer Carl Maria von Weber, who set his famous opera Der Freischütz with its Wolfsschlucht ("Wolf's Gorge") scene set near the town of Rathen.

In the Nazi era the description of German territories as Schweiz ("Switzerland") was officially banned. For that reason, with effect from 19 October 1938, the official term "Sächsische Schweiz" was replaced by "Amtshauptmannschaft Pirna" and from January 1939 by "Kreis Pirna" in the names of the local places of Königstein, Obervogelgesang, Ottendorf, Porschdorf, Rathen, Rathewalde, Rathmannsdorf and Reinhardtsdorf.

=== Medieval castles ===
When Germans began to settle in the 13th century, there was a systematic banishment of Bohemian influence and numerous local military conflicts erupted around strategically important fortifications. These fortifications primarily serve to protect the border and trading routes. Due to a lack of central power this protective function was left to local knights. The progressive division of the area due to the hereditary distribution of estates upset the economic balance of the region and many castles degenerated into bases for robber barons.

Not until the middle of the 16th century, when the Wettins captured many of the castles did the situation stabilise. Today, these castles and ruins, some of which are well preserved, are popular with tourists, who make their way to these sites up steep climbing paths.

These castles include: Hohnstein, Hockstein, Neurathen, Altrathen, Königstein, Lilienstein, Falkenstein, Frienstein, and Rauschenstein.

== National park ==
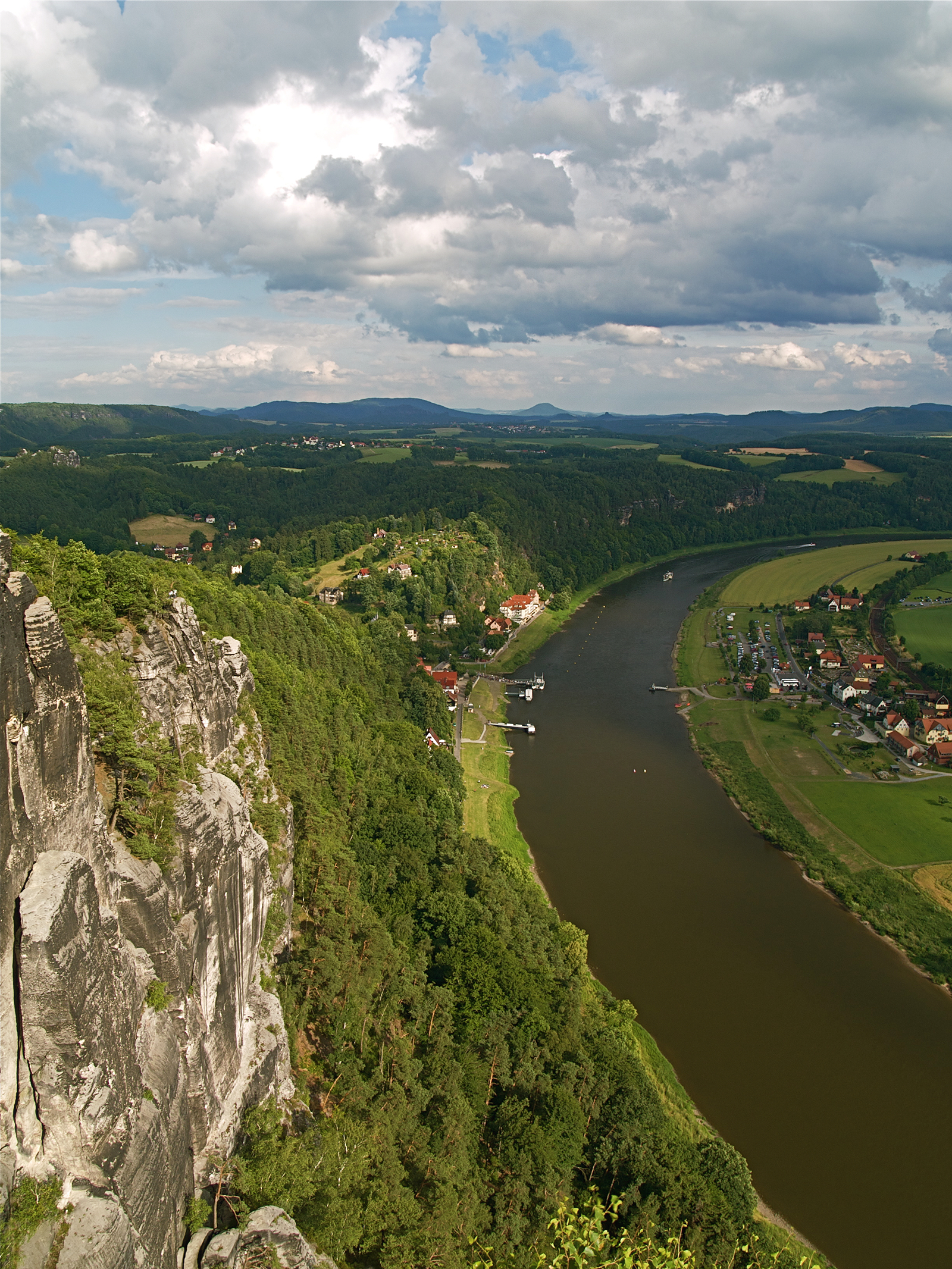
View of the Elbe near Rathen

In September 1990, even before the reunification of Germany, a national park was created in Saxon Switzerland in order to protect the unique natural character of the hill range. The 93 km^{2} area covers two physically separate regions: one near Rathen – the region of the Bastei, Polenz valley, Brand and Uttewalder Grund – and the other embracing the whole Saxon Switzerland Hinterland (Hintere Sächsische Schweiz) between the Elbe and the state border with the Czech Republic and including the Schrammsteinen, Großer Winterberg, Großer Zschand and Kirnitzsch valley.

== Rock climbing ==
Saxon Switzerland is characterized by its sandstone rocks which draw many rock climbers. There are some 14,000 climbing routes on over 1,100 rock pinnacles. At the beginning of the 20th century, the Saxon Rules for rock climbing were established. They are considered to be one of the origins of free climbing. Ropes and bolts may only be used for safety but never as a means of climbing. The use of chalk and common means of protection such as nuts and friends is also not permitted; instead knotted nylon slings are used. With a few exceptions, climbing is only practised and permitted at freestanding rock towers.

A Saxon oddity is the concept of a Baustelle (literally "building site") where climbers scale a difficult section by climbing on top of the shoulders of other climbers (sometimes several people on top of each other) with everybody involved only holding himself by holds the rock provides. Though this would normally be considered a form of aid climbing, it is here accepted as a form of free climbing. As the pinnacles are often very close to one other, jumping from one rock to another is also rather popular and this technique even has its own grades of difficulty.

In addition to the climbing summits there are also various steep paths, on which hikers with sure-footedness and a head for heights can climb, in places, great heights with the aid of steps, ladders, metal rungs and railings at various points. Amongst the most popular of these climbing paths are the Häntzschelstiege in the Affensteinen, as well as the Heilige Stiege, the Rübezahlstiege and the Rotkehlchenstiege north of Schmilka.

== Boofen ==
A Boofe (plural: Boofen) is local slang for sleeping out overnight in the open under a rock overhang and has a long tradition in Saxon Switzerland. Many young people travel to Saxon Switzerland at weekends in order to boofen. Today it is only permitted by the National Park Authority at designated sites. However the growing number of Boofers and the bad conduct of individuals (e.g. who light illegal campfires, tear up saplings or cause soil erosion) has led to repeated altercations.

== Points of interest ==
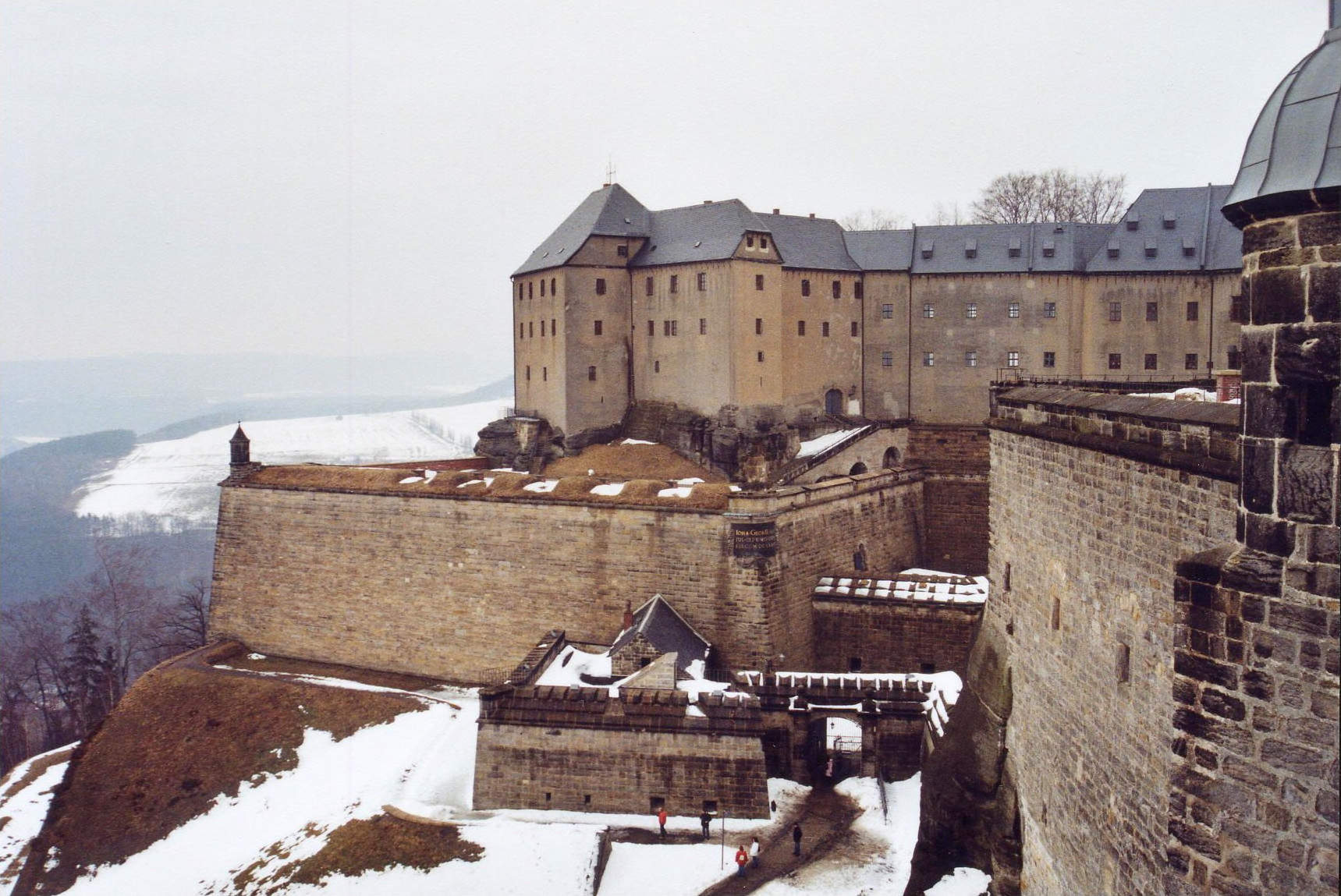
Königstein Fortress

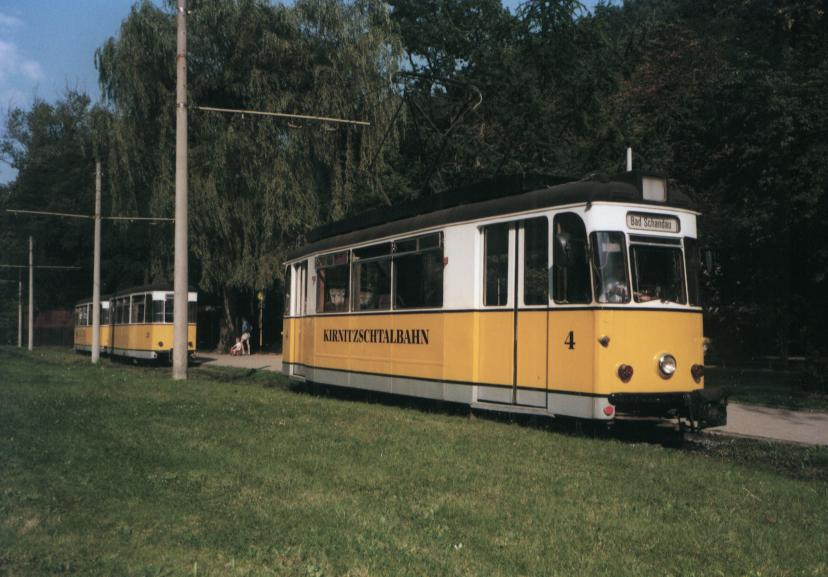
Kirnitzschtal Tramway

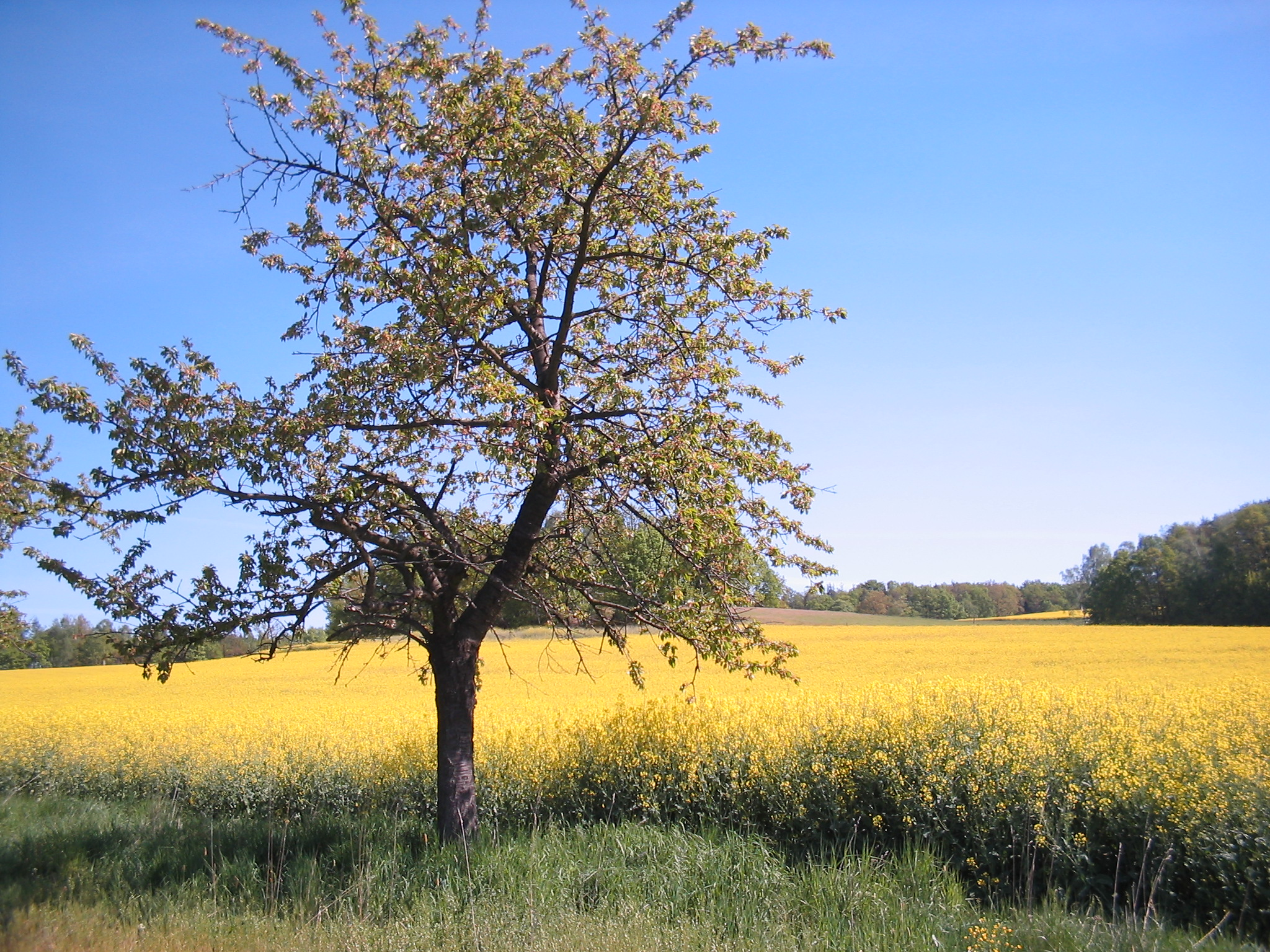
Agricultural fields are typical of Saxon Switzerland

- Bastei and Neurathen Castle
- Bärensteine and Rauenstein near Weißig
- Biela Valley
- Stolpen Castle
- Ruins of Wehlen Castle
- Rock arch near Wehlen
- Frienstein and the Ida Grotto
- Mount Gohrisch with its refuge hut
- Kaiserkrone and Zirkelstein
- Kirnitzschtal Tramway, an historic interurban in the Kirnitzsch valley
- Little Saxon Switzerland, a miniature park layout in the village of Wehlen
- Königstein Fortress, the largest hill fortress in Europe
- Kuhstall on the New Wildenstein
- Lilienstein, Schrammsteine
- Obere Schleuse, boat trip near Hinterhermsdorf
- Rathen Open-Air Stage, an open-air theatre
- Papststein with observation tower and restaurant
- Pfaffenstein and the Barbarine
- Wolfsberg
- Bad Schandau Botanical Gardens, a regional botanical garden

== Panorama ==
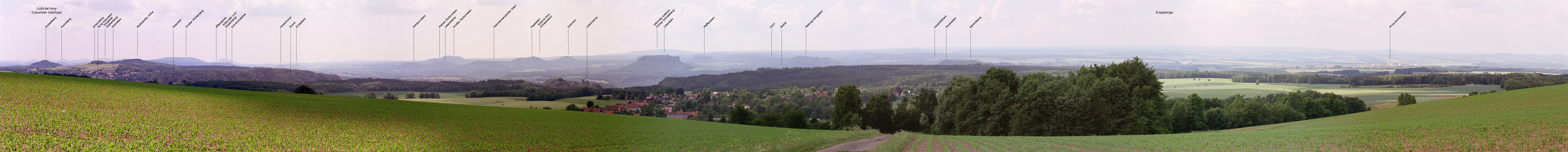
View from the Hohburkersdorf lookout with a panorama of Saxon and Bohemian Switzerland, showing from the left the peaks of the Lusatian Mountains, including the Studenec (Kaltenberg); several smaller mountains near Hohnstein as well as Hohnstein Castle, the Polenz valley, the Großer Winterberg (the highest hill in Saxon Switzerland east of the Elbe), the Rosenberg, the Affensteine and the Schrammsteine, the Kaiserkrone und den Zirkelstein, die Zschirnsteine mit dem Kleinen und dem Großen Zschirnstein (der höchste Berg der Saxon Switzerland), dann der Papststein und der Gohrisch and in between in the distance near Ústí nad Labem the Buková hora with its TV tower. In the foreground you can see the climbing rock of the Lokomotive near Rathen. On the horizon the next peak is the Hoher Schneeberg (the highest mountain in the Elbe Sandstone Mountains), in front of it the Lilienstein, further right is the Bastei and above it and behind Königstein Fortress. Even further right are the Rauenstein, the Bärensteine and the village of Leupoldishain with the site of the firm of Wismut. On the horizon is the crest of the Eastern Ore Mountains and in the foreground is Pirna-Sonnenstein.
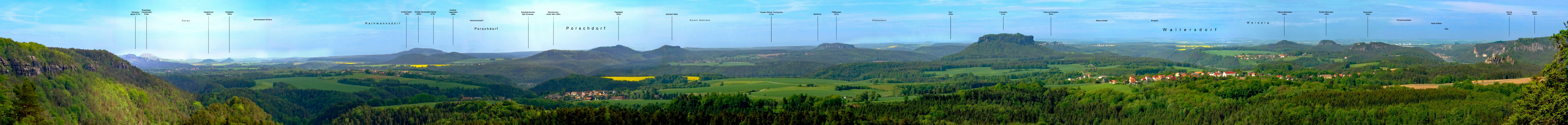
View from the Brand lookout

== See also ==
- Saxon Switzerland National Park
- Elbe Sandstone Mountains
- List of regions of Saxony

== Gallery ==
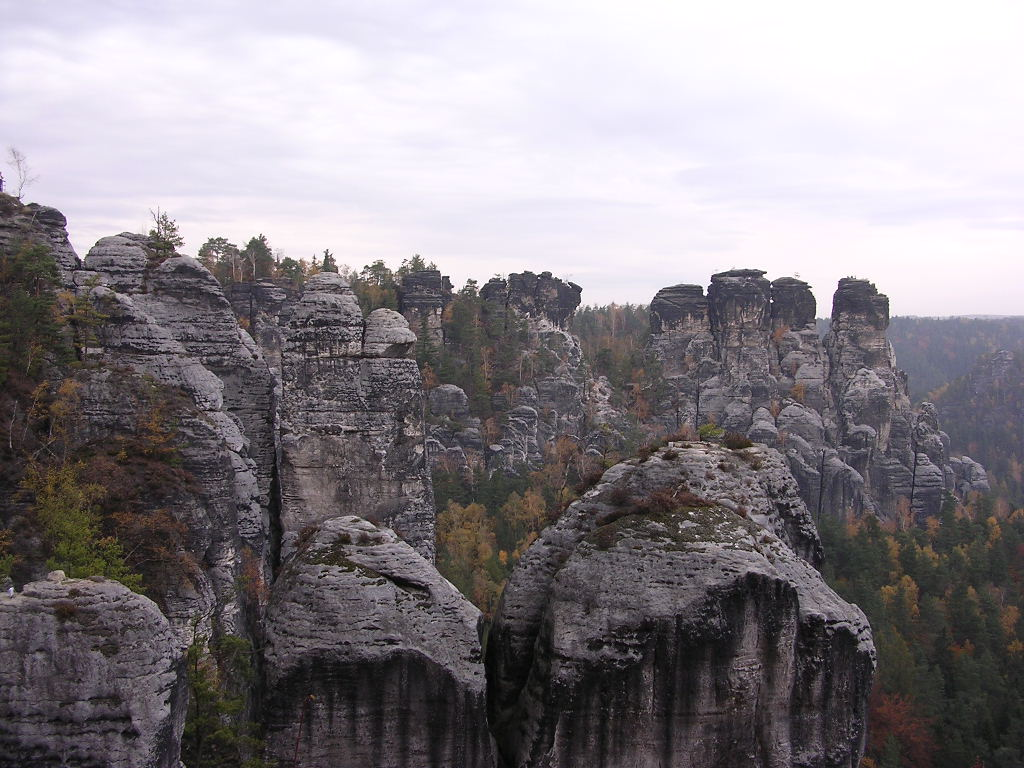
View from the Bastei

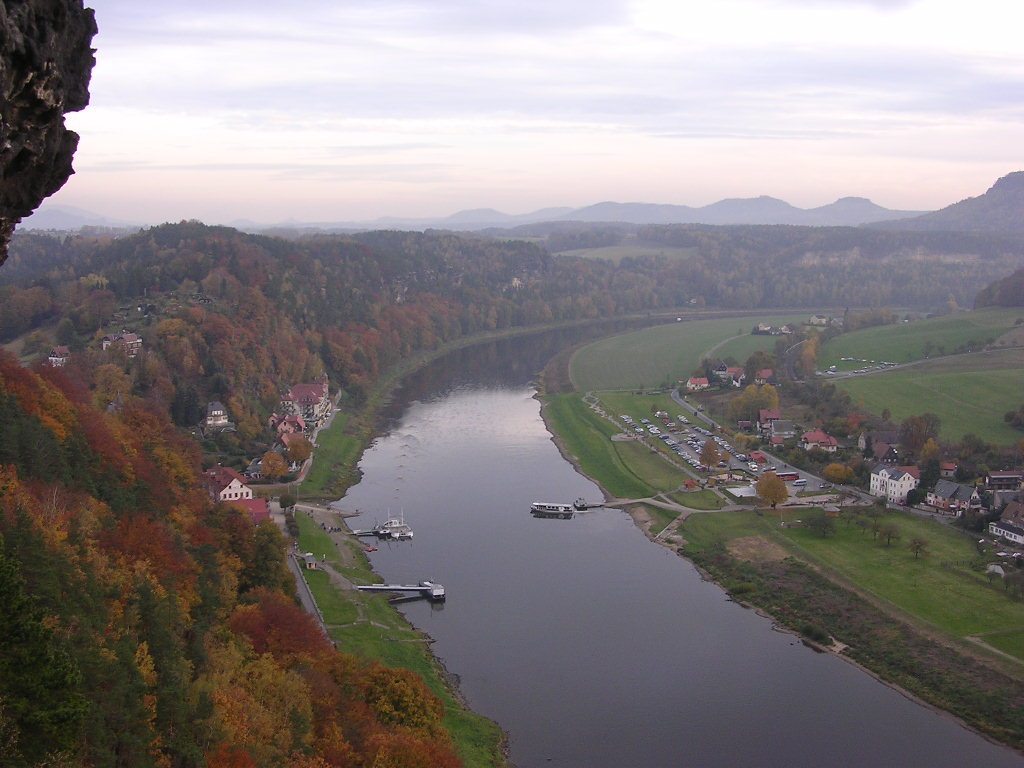
View of the Elbe River from Bastei

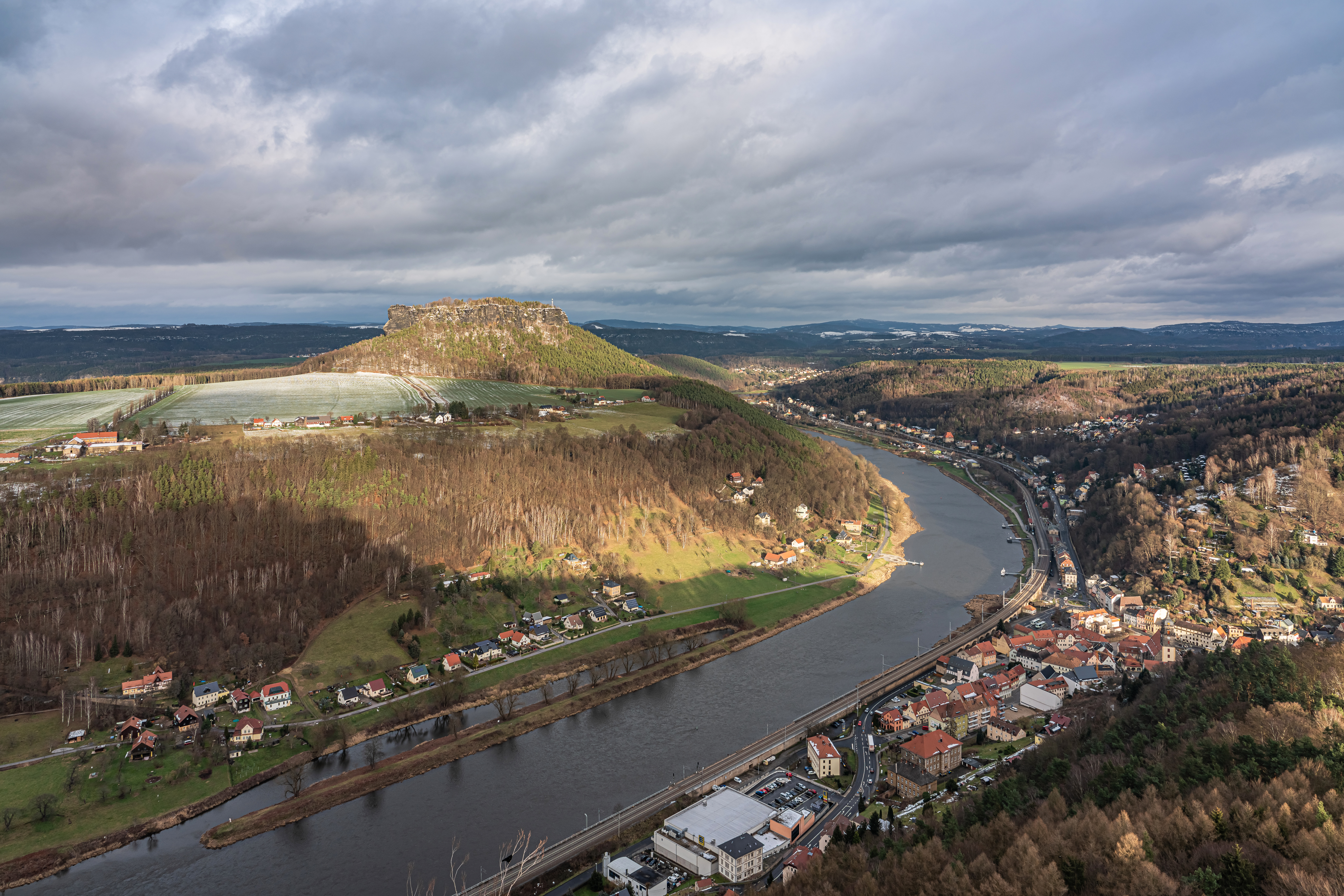
View from Königstein fortress to Lilienstein and Elbe

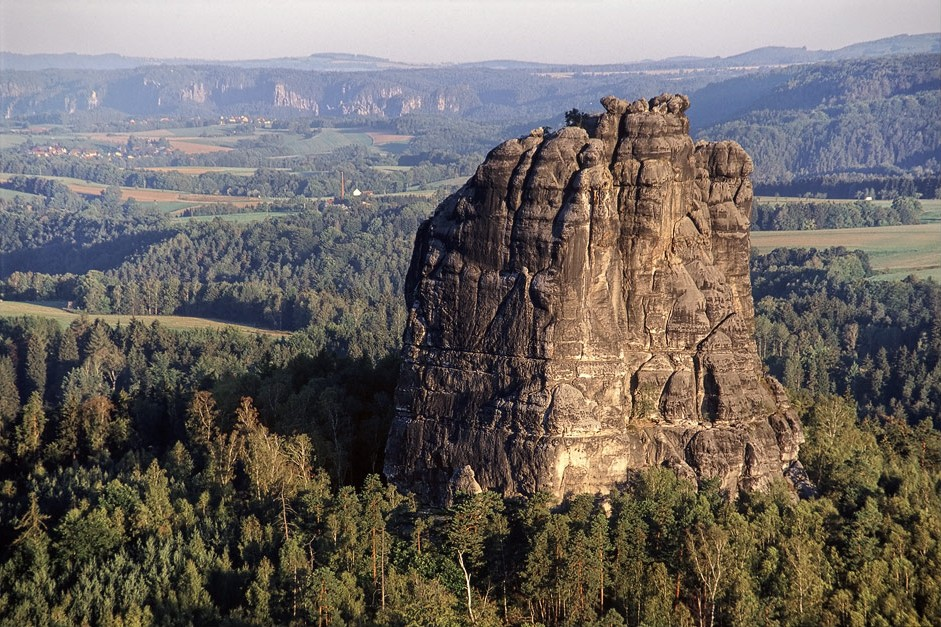
Falkenstein

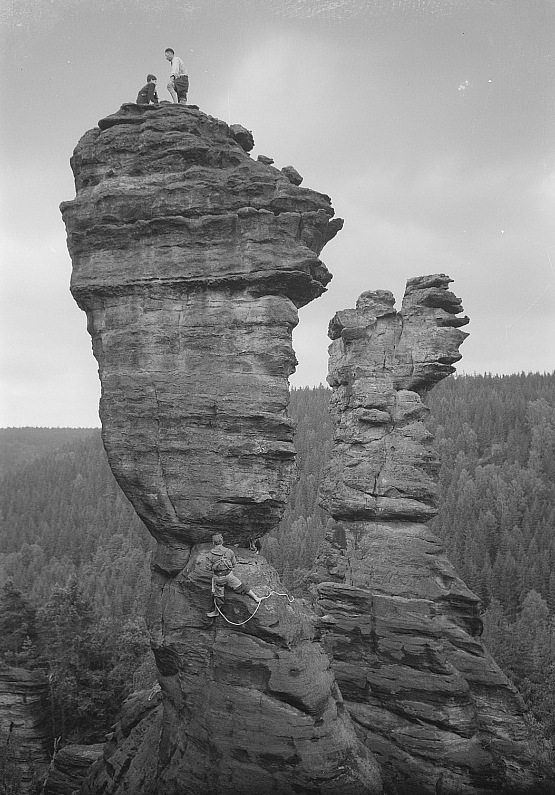
Climbing in the Biela valley

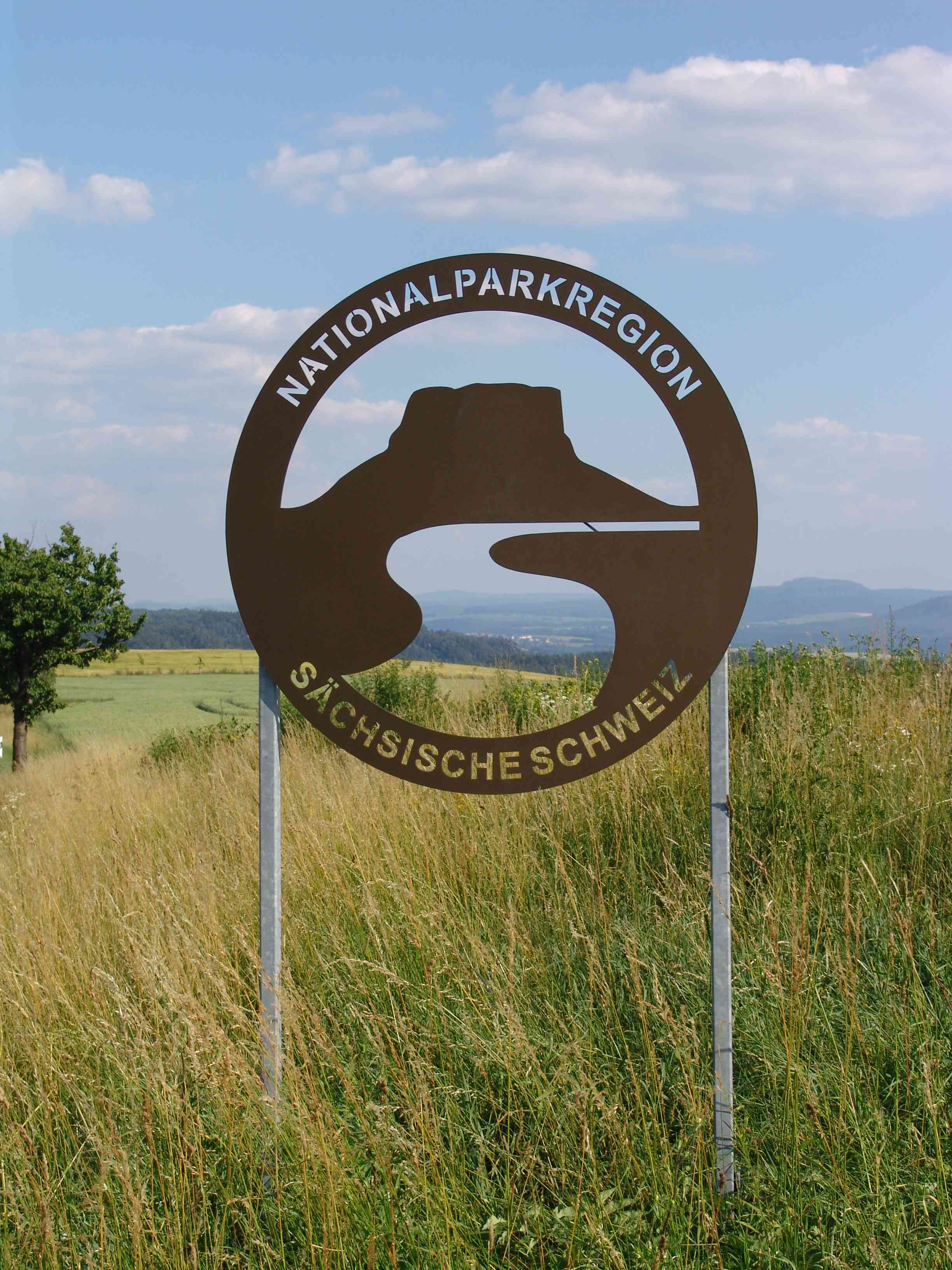
National Park sign

== Sources ==
- Autorenkollektiv: Brockhaus Reisehandbuch Sächsische Schweiz – Osterzgebirge. Leipzig 1970.
- Wilhelm Lebrecht Götzinger: Schandau und seine Umgebungen, oder Beschreibung der Sächsischen Schweiz. Begersche Buch- und Kunsthandlung, Dresden 1812.
- Heinz Klemm: Die Entdeckung der Sächsischen Schweiz. Sachsenverlag, Dresden 1953.
- Alfred Meiche: Die Burgen und vorgeschichtlichen Wohnstätten der Sächsischen Schweiz. Wilhelm Baensch Verlagsbuchhandlung, Dresden 1907. (Reprint Leipzig 1979)
- Alfred Meiche: Historisch-topographische Beschreibung der Amtshauptmannschaft Pirna. Dresden 1927.
- Michael Bellmann: Der Klettersteigführer: Klettersteige und Stiegen in der Sächsischen Schweiz. Dresden 2019.
