= Lilienstein =

Mountain in Saxon Switzerland

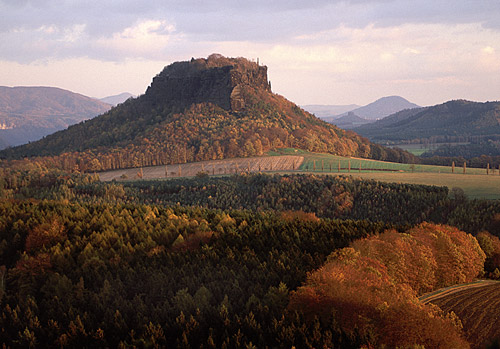
- Lilienstein at sunset

Highest point
- Elevation: 415.2 m (1,362 ft)
- Coordinates: 50°55′52″N 14°05′05″E

Geography
- Location within Saxony
- Location: Saxony, Germany

Geology
- Mountain type: Table
- Rock type: Sandstone

Lilienstein is a highly distinctive mountain in Saxon Switzerland, in Saxony, southeastern Germany, and was once the site of a Bohemian castle. It is one of the few table mountains on the east of the river Elbe and constitutes the symbol of the Saxon Switzerland National Park.

== Name ==
The name is not related to the flower lily (German: Lilie) but is probably derived from St. Gilgen or St. Ilgen (earlier names of the mountain were "Ylgenstein" and "Illgenstein"). These names refer to Saint Giles.

== Location ==
The Lilienstein is located 15 km east of Pirna and 5 km west of Bad Schandau. It overlooks the river Elbe, which forms a 180° loop around the mountain. The Königstein Fortress is located opposite on the left bank of the river.
