= Raumberg (Saxon Switzerland) =

Mountain in Saxony, Germany

Coordinates: 50°53′57″N 14°20′02″E

Raumberg (Sächsische Schweiz)
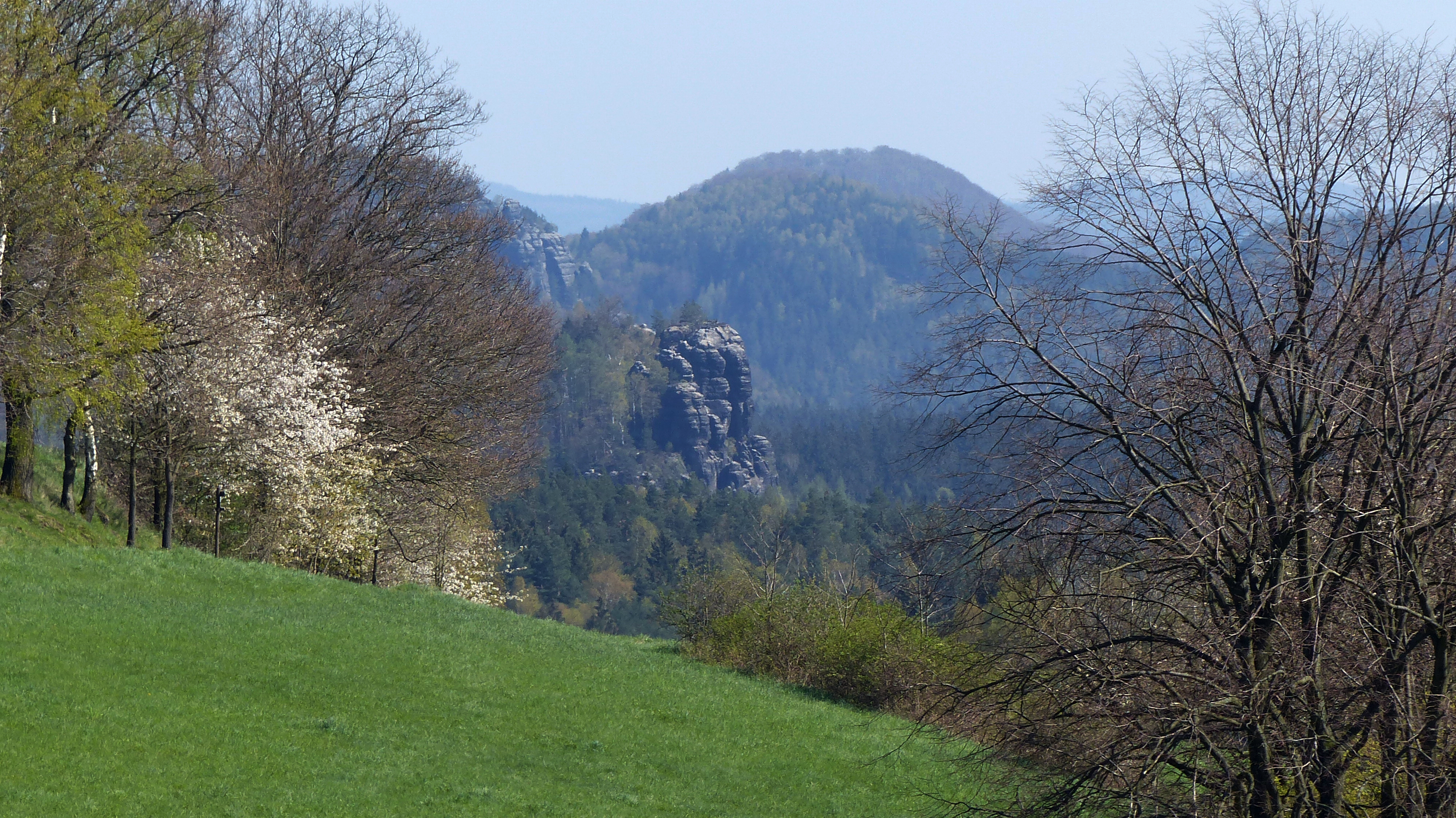
- View of the Raumberg from the north (before the Hochhübel).

Geography
- Location within Saxony
- Location: Saxony, Germany

Raumberg (Sächsische Schweiz) is a mountain of Saxony, southeastern Germany.
