= Kleiner Winterberg (Saxon Switzerland) =

Mountain in Saxony, Germany

Coordinates: 50°54′39″N 14°15′27″E

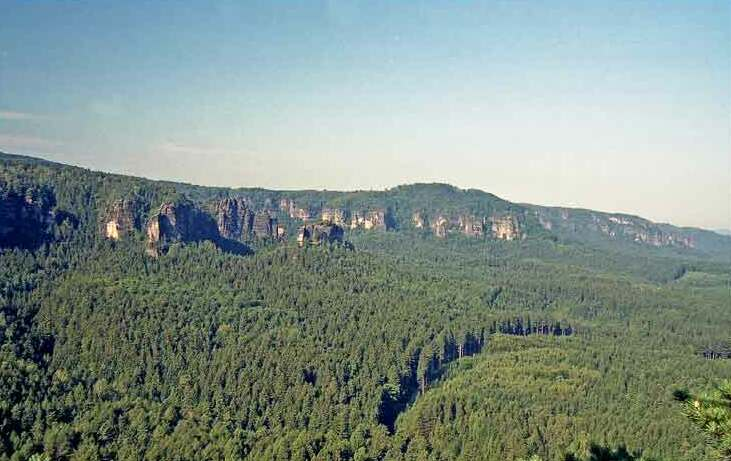
- Winterberg Hill from Techstein in Germany

Geography
- Location within Saxony
- Location: Saxony, Germany

Kleiner Winterberg is a hill in Saxon Switzerland.
