= Großer Winterberg =

Coordinates: 50°53′45″N 14°15′35″E

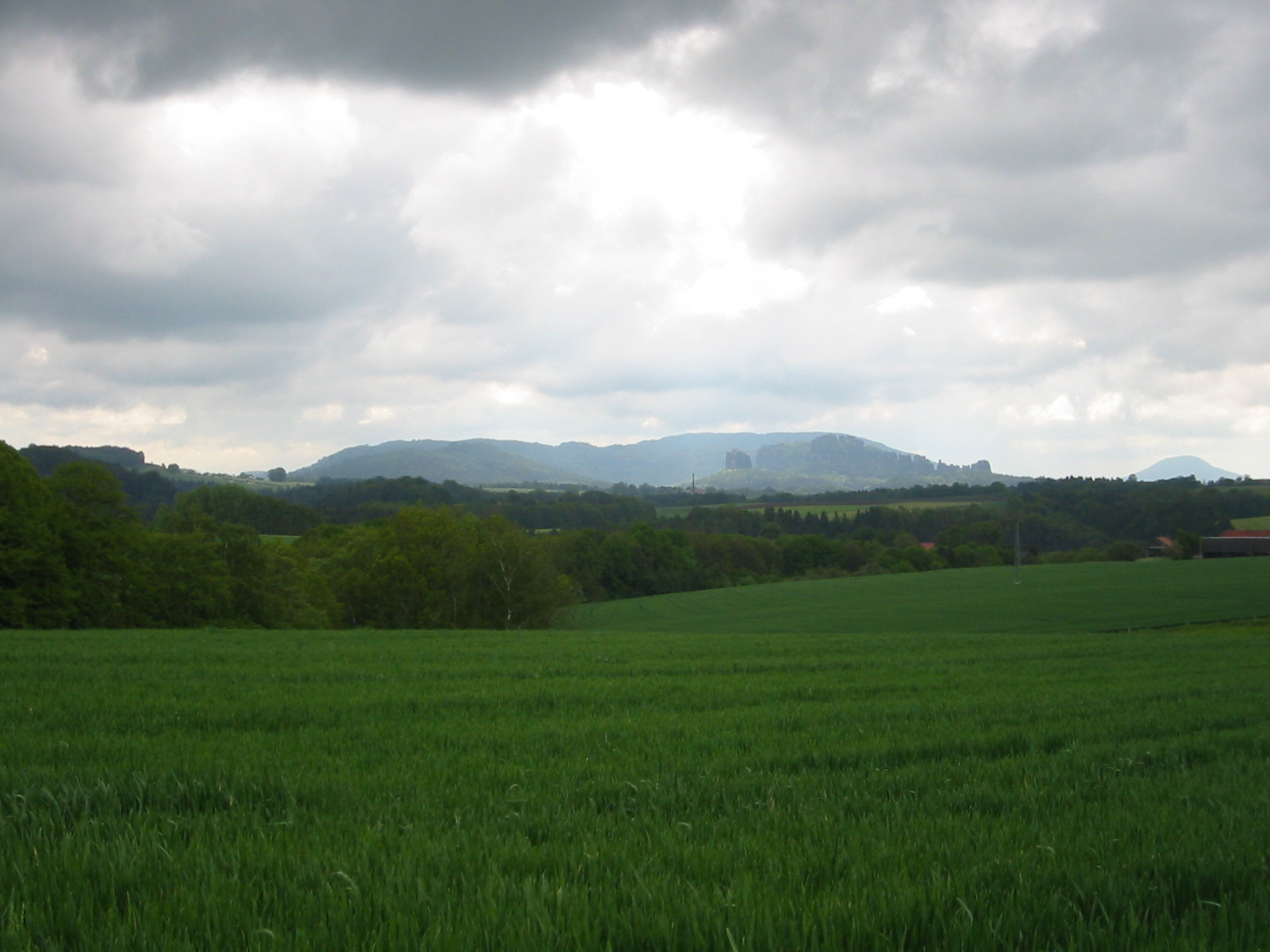
- The Schrammsteine with the Großer Winterberg in the background

Geography
- Location within Saxony
- Location: Saxony, Germany

Großer Winterberg is a mountain of Saxony, southeastern Germany. It is the second highest mountain of the Saxon Switzerland and is located on the border between Germany and the Czech Republic.
