= Lusatian Fault =

The Lusatian Fault (German: Lausitzer Verwerfung; Upper Sorbian: Łužiska wina; Lower Sorbian: Łužyska wina), formerly Lusatian Overthrust (Lausitzer Überschiebung; Łužiske presadźenje; Łužyske nadsajźenje), is the most important geological disturbance zone between the Elbe valley and the Giant Mountains. It is a fault that separates the granite of Lusatia from the Cretaceous sandstones of North Bohemia to the south. It is assumed that there was a fault throw of several hundred metres whereby the northern block was uplifted or upthrust relative to the southern block.

== Course ==
The start of the fault in the west is assessed as being near Oschatz, but it first becomes topographically significant as a steep ledge near Weinböhla. From there it runs eastwards along the northern perimeter of the Dresden Basin and forms the Elbe valley slopes from Radebeul via Dresden to Pirna. From there it continues rather less noticeably along the northern edge of the Elbe Sandstone Mountains via Hohnstein and Hinterhermsdorf. In Hohnstein by the so-called Wartenberg Road (Wartenbergstraße) is the only geological outcrop where the granite of Lusatia lies immediately above the sandstone.

Further east the fault follows the northern boundary of the Lusatian / Zittau Mountains via Jiřetín pod Jedlovou (St. Georgenthal), Waltersdorf and Olbersdorf, where it is most prominent east of the Zittau Mountains.

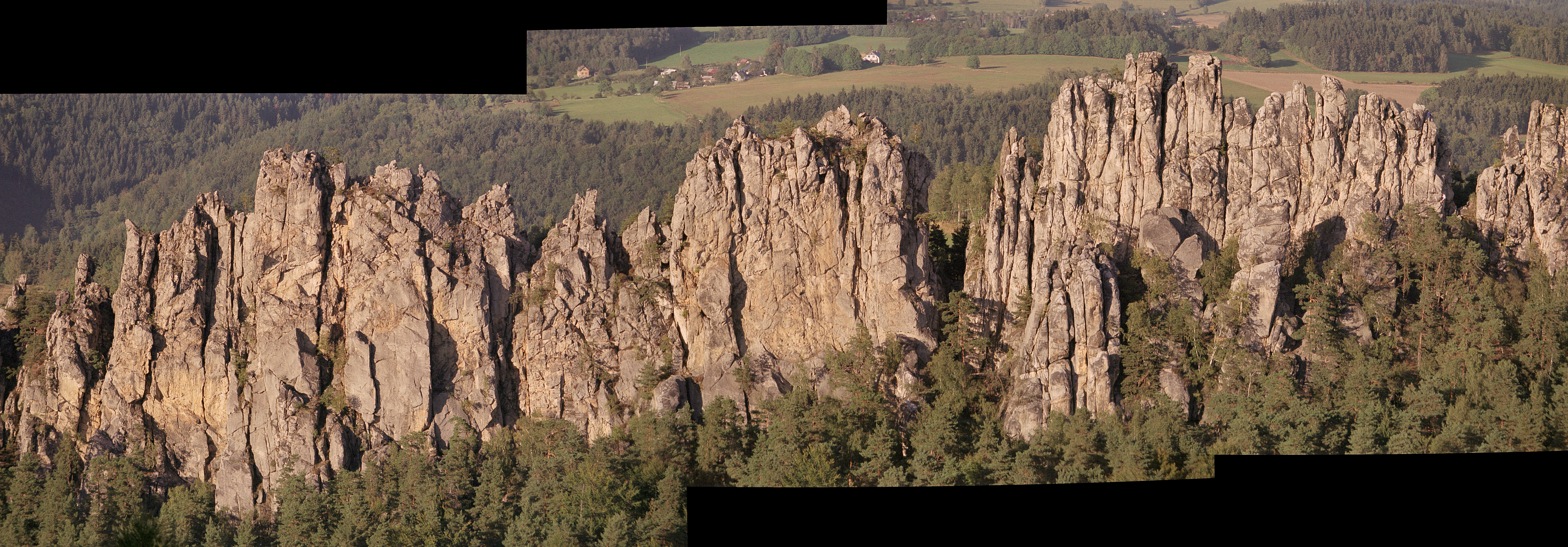
Natural monument of Suché skály, Bohemian Paradise

Now back on Czech territory, the fault more or less follows the crest line of the Jeschken Mountains. At the Ještěd (Jeschken) is the highest point on the fault line, a topographical dominant that is visible from a long way off. The fault then runs eastwards, almost in a straight line, along the Ještěd-Kozákov Ridge - interrupted by the valleys of the Mohelka and the Jizera - to Kozákov in the Bohemian Paradise. In Malá Skála is the most notable geological outcrop along the fault, the Suché skály. Here the once horizontal sandstone beds were tilted vertically by the pressure of the fault and, today, form an impressive rock formation.

== See also ==
- Lusatian Mountains

== Sources ==
- Otto Herrmann: Steinbruchindustrie und Steinbruchgeologie. Verlag von Gebrüder Borntraeger, Berlin 1899
- Kurt Pietzsch: Abriss der Geologie von Sachsen. Volk und Wissen, Berlin 1951
