= Biela (river) =

River in Germany

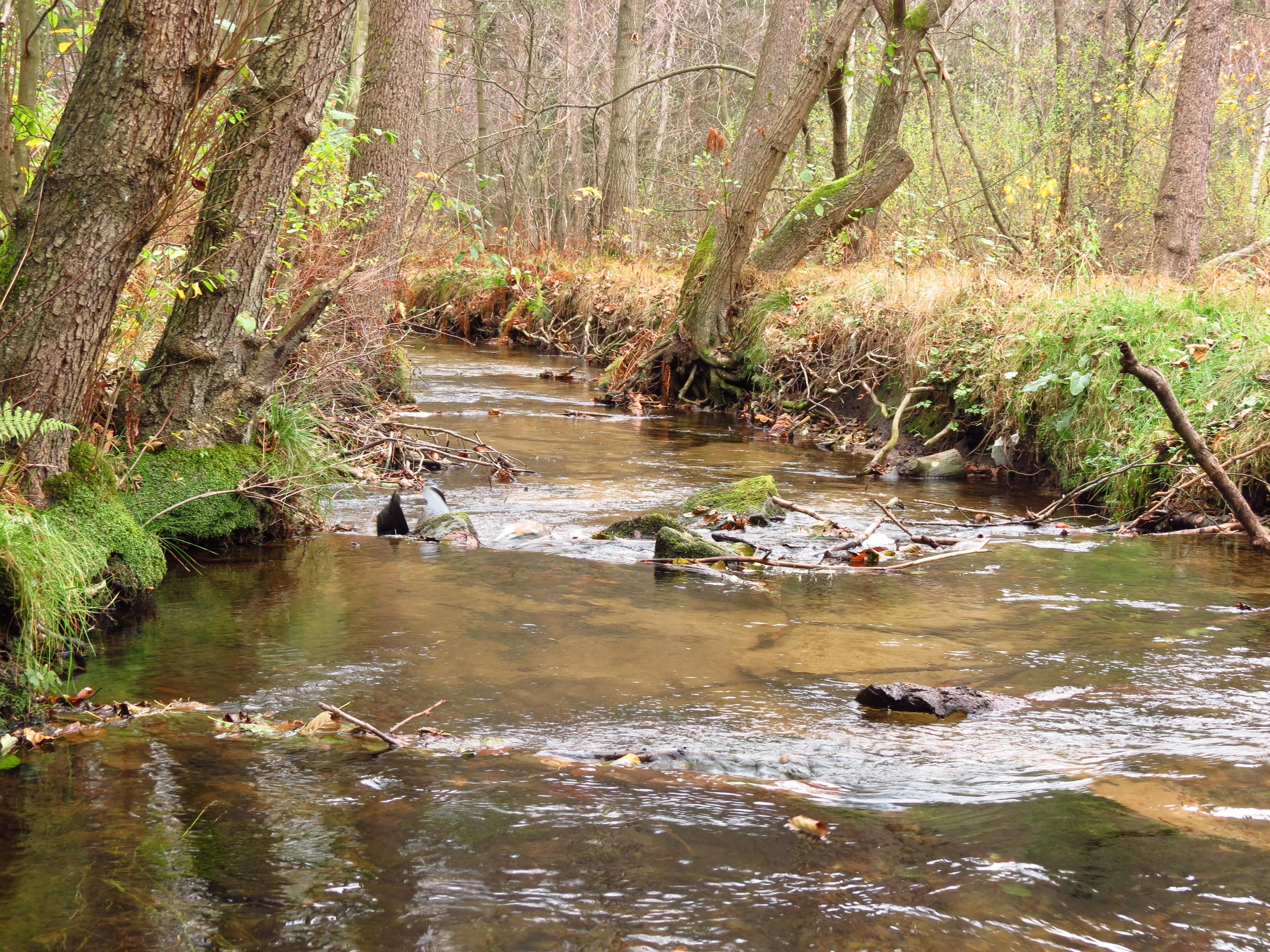

Location
- Countries: Germany; Czech Republic

Physical characteristics
- Source
  - location: Bohemian Switzerland
  - elevation: 520 m (1,710 ft)
- Mouth
  - location: Elbe
  - coordinates: 50.9194°N 14.0743°E
- Length: 18 km (11 mi)

Basin features
- Progression: Elbe→ North Sea

The Biela (German name) or Bělá or Ostrovská Bělá (Czech names) is a river in eastern Germany and northern Czech Republic, a left tributary of the Elbe. The source is near Ostrov hamlet in the municipality of Tisá, in the Bohemian Switzerland, northwest of Děčín. After a few km it crosses into Saxony (and the Saxon Switzerland). The town Königstein is located at the confluence of the Biela with the Elbe.

== See also ==
- List of rivers of Saxony
- List of rivers of the Czech Republic
