= Königstein, Saxony =

Königstein
- Town
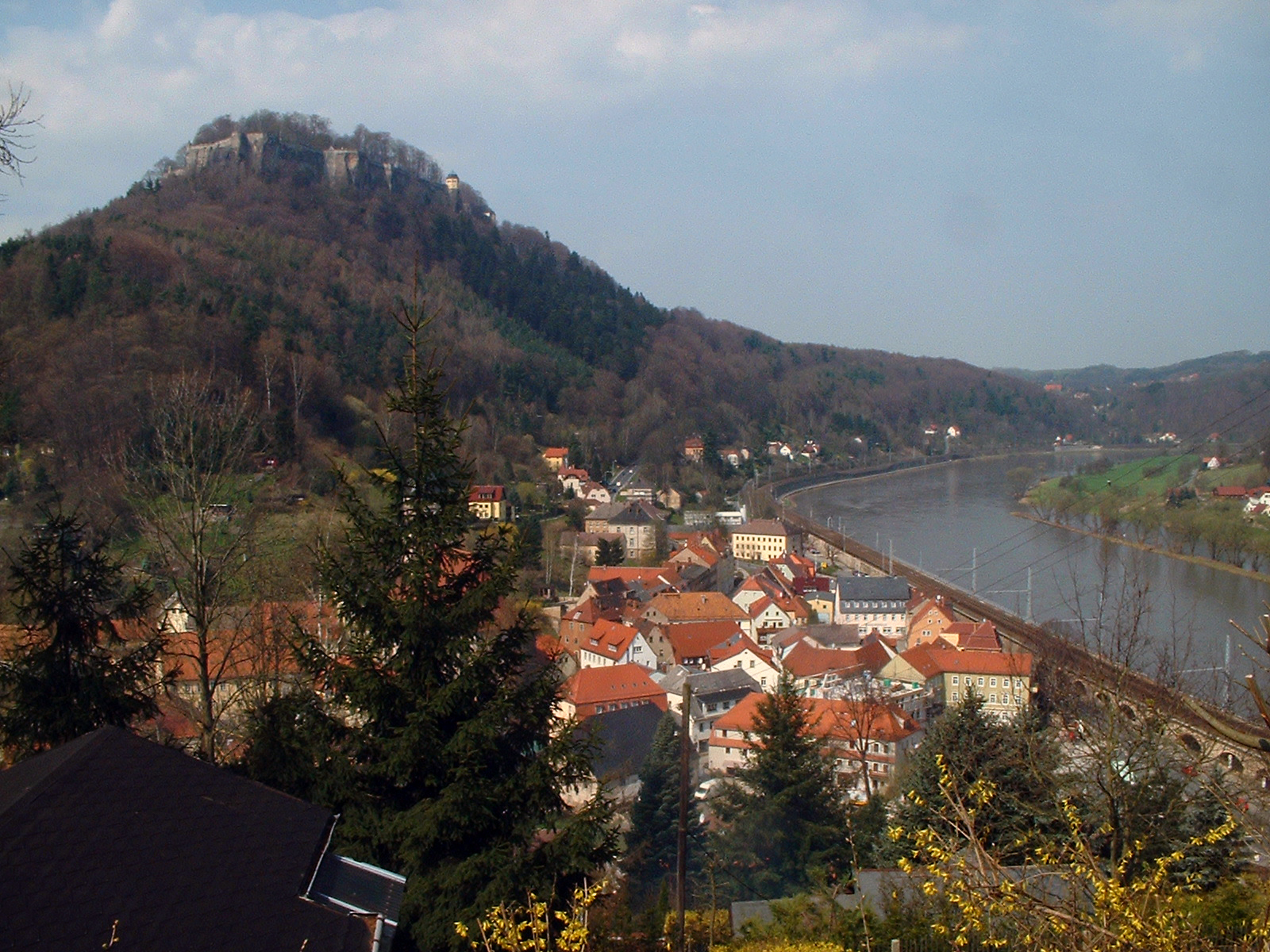

- Coat of arms

- Location of Königstein within Sächsische Schweiz-Osterzgebirge district
- Interactive map of Königstein
- Location within Germany Location within Saxony
- Coordinates: 50°55′8″N 14°4′17″E
- Country: Germany
- State: Saxony
- District: Sächsische Schweiz-Osterzgebirge
- Subdivisions: 2

Government
  - Mayor (2022–29): Tobias Kummer (CDU)

Area
  - Total: 27.04 km^{2} (10.44 sq mi)
- Elevation: 212 m (696 ft)

Population (2025-12-31)
  - Total: 2,082
  - Density: 77.00/km^{2} (199.4/sq mi)
- Time zone: UTC+01:00 (CET)
  - Summer (DST): UTC+02:00 (CEST)
- Postal codes: 01824
- Dialling codes: 035021
- Vehicle registration: PIR
- Website: www.koenigstein-sachsen.de

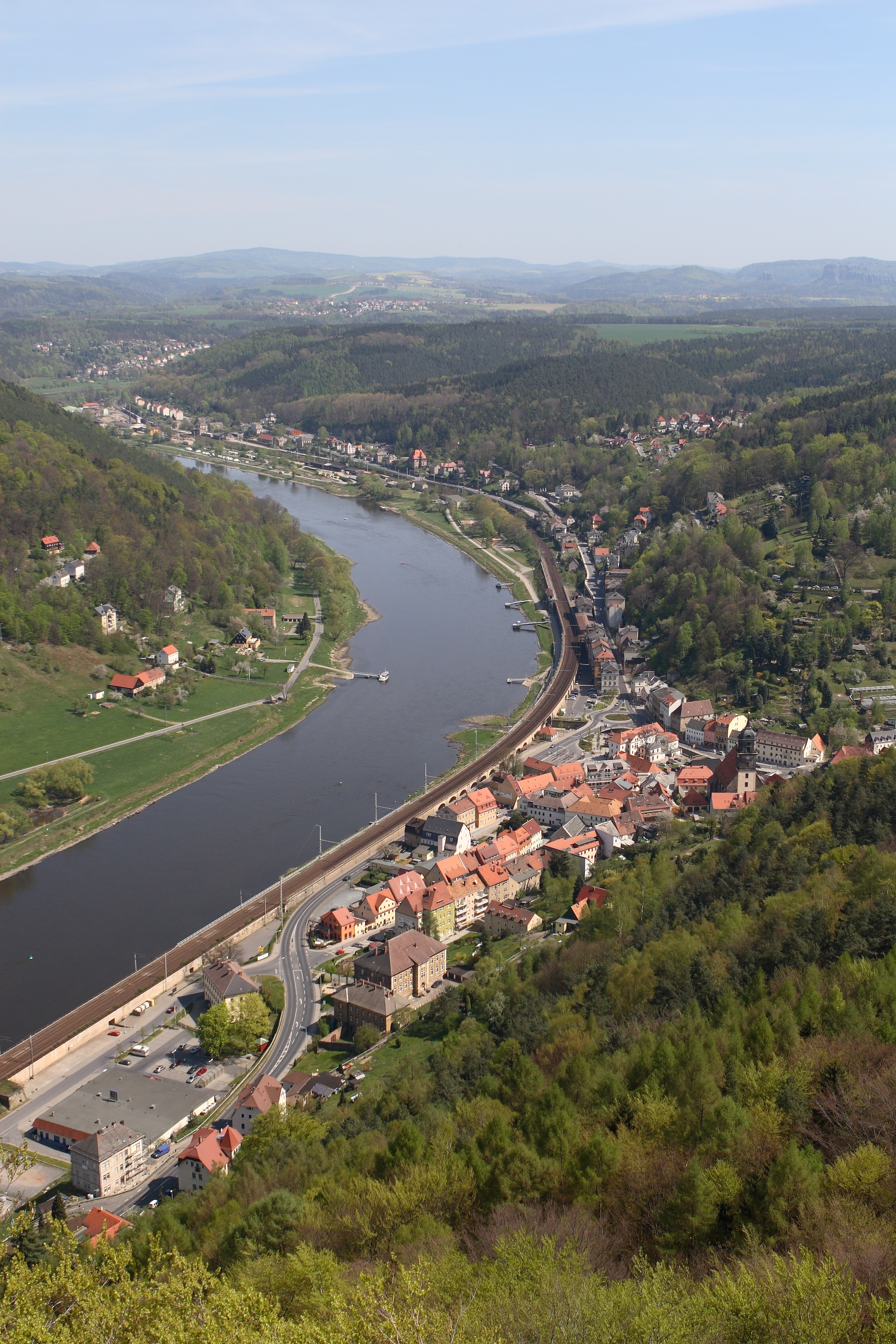
Königstein in 2007

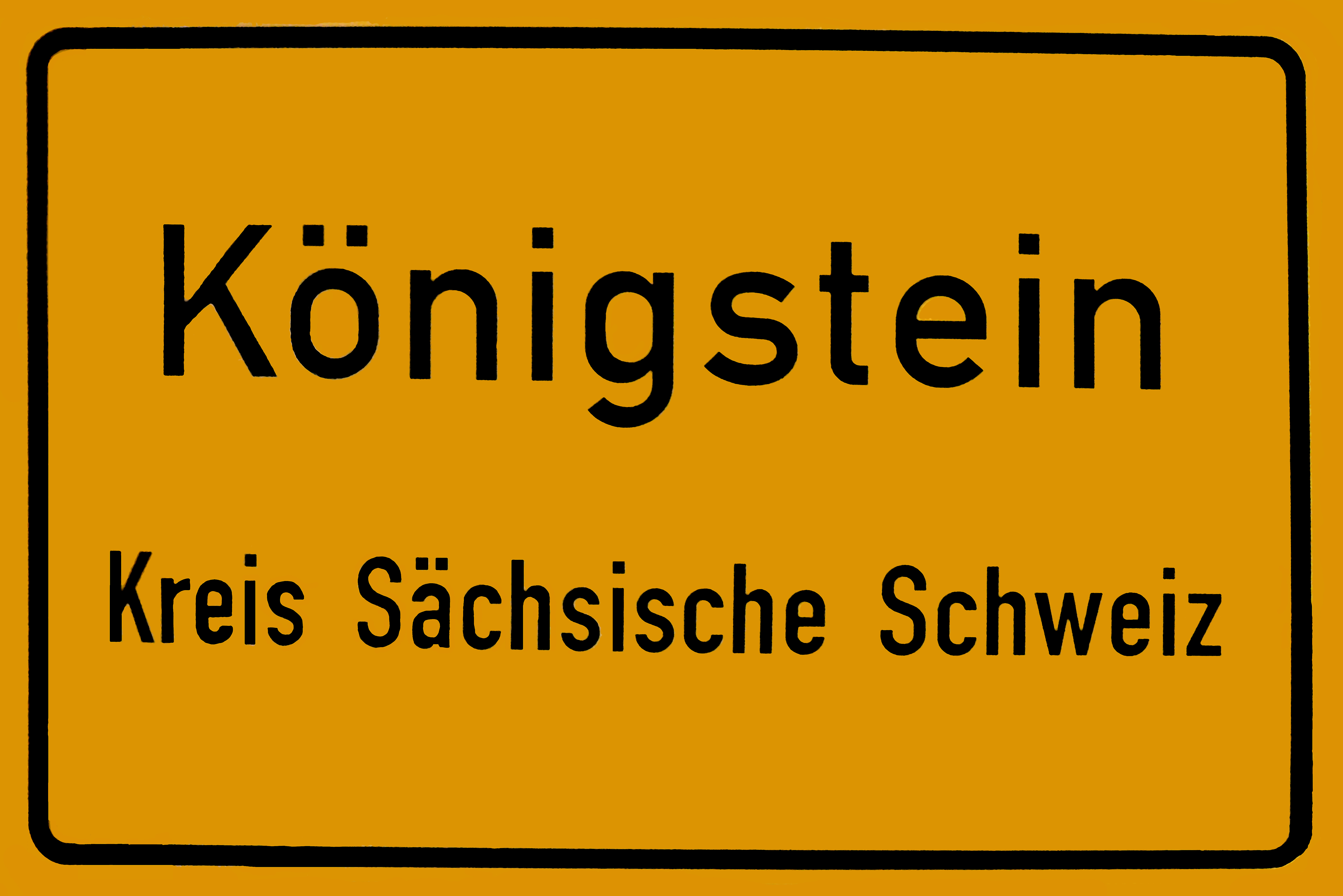
Street sign - "Königstein - Kreis Sächschische Schweiz"

Königstein (German pronunciation: [ˈkøːniçʃtaɪn] or [ˈkøːnikʃtaɪn]; Upper Sorbian: Kralowc, pronounced [ˈkʁalɔfts]) is a town on the river Elbe in Saxony in Germany. Königstein lies in the Sächsische Schweiz-Osterzgebirge District and had a population of 2,089 in 2018. It includes land on both banks of the Elbe, but the centre and most of the town lies to the south of the river. The Königstein Fortress is situated above and to the south-west of the town.

== Geography ==
Königstein is located in the Elbe Sandstone Mountains. The town lies in between Pirna and the Czech border at the confluence of the Biela with the Elbe. Königstein was damaged during the flooding of the Elbe in 2002.

== History ==
The town of Königstein was first mentioned in 1379 as a settlement near the castle of Königstein. It was named after a King of Bohemia, but eventually passed to the Saxon Margraves of Meißen. However, Königstein still retains the double-tailed lion of Bohemia in its coat of arms. During World War II the prisoner-of-war camp for Allied officers, Oflag IV-B, was located in the castle.

== Transport ==
Königstein (Sächsische Schweiz) station, on the Dresden S-Bahn and the Dresden to Prague railway, is located in the centre of the town. Königstein is also a stop for the Sächsische Dampfschiffahrt ships, including historic paddle steamers, operating on the Elbe between Dresden and the Czech border.

Bus services in the Königstein area are operated by the Regionalverkehr Sächsische Schweiz-Osterzgebirge, who also operate the Königstein to Halbestadt passenger ferry that crosses the river to the Halbestadt quarter on the north bank.
