= Rathen ferry =

Cable ferry across the Elbe river at Rathen, Germany

Coordinates: 50.957305°N 14.079977°E

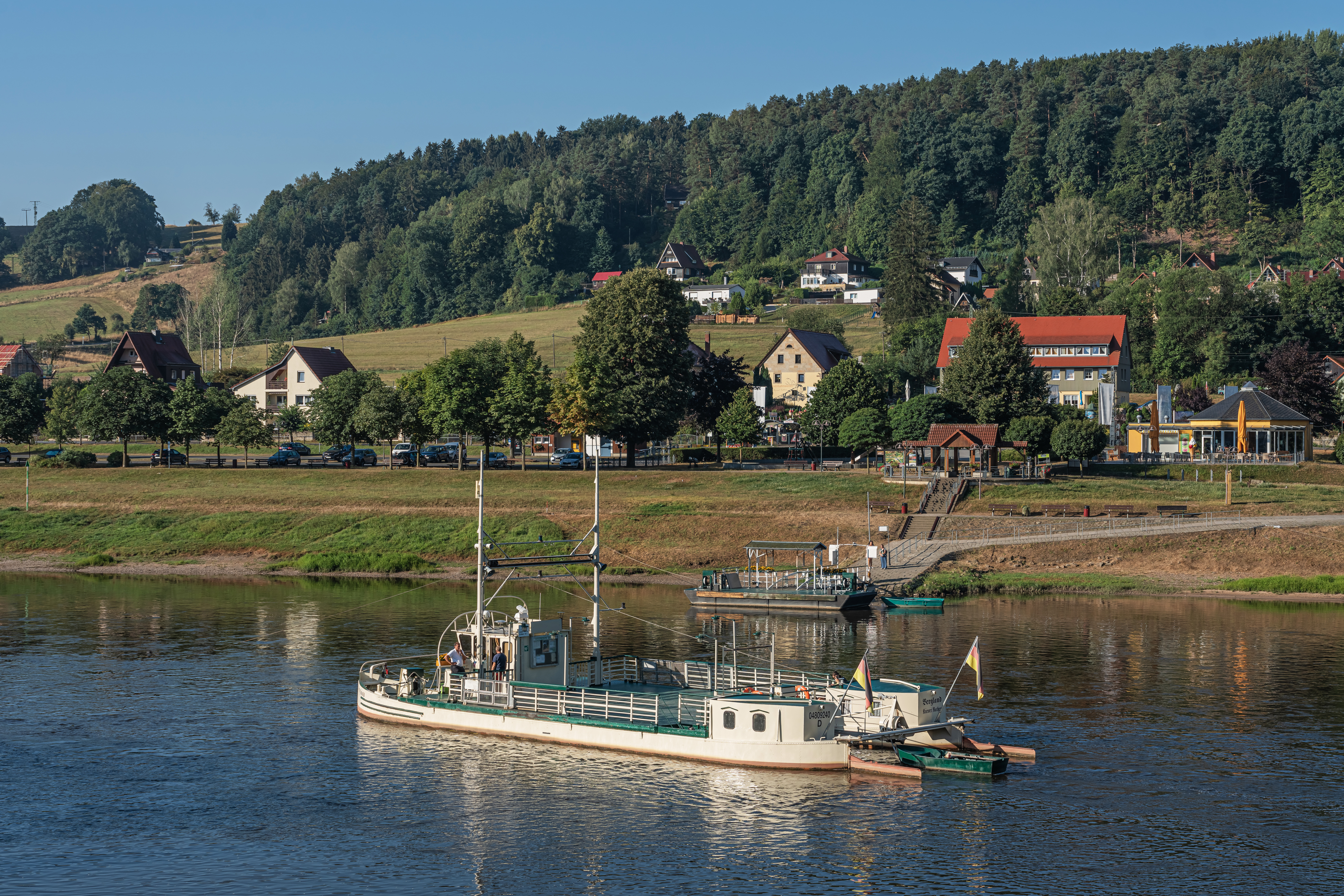
The Rathen Ferry in mid-stream, looking towards Oberrathen.

Time-lapse video of the ferry, view of Rathen from the Bastei cliffs. The ferry leaves its landing stage on the near bank after another ship crossed, and its floating cable can be seen picked out by buoys.

The Rathen Ferry is a passenger cable ferry across the Elbe river at Rathen in Saxony, Germany. It connects Niederrathen, on the east bank, to Oberrathen, on the west bank. Kurort Rathen railway station, on the Dresden S-Bahn, is about 200 metres (660 ft) from the Oberrathen ferry terminal. The Niederrathen ferry terminal provides access to the famous Bastei cliffs, to the Amselsee lake, and the Felsenbühne Rathen outdoor theatre.

The ferry is owned by the Gemeinde Rathen. It operates from 05:30 until 23:45, seven days a week and throughout the year. On weekdays service starts at 04:30. In summer, service is extended until 00:45.

The ferry service is provided by the Bergland, an unpowered catamaran ferry built in 1954. Technically, the ferry is a reaction ferry, which is propelled by the current of the water. The ferry is attached to a floating cable which is anchored firmly in the riverbed upstream of the ferry. To operate the ferry, it is angled into the current, causing the force of the current to swing the ferry across the river on the cable. A smaller diesel powered ferry, the Ratiner, is available when the Bergland cannot be used, particularly during times of flooding or ice.
