= Wehlgrund =

Valley in eastern Germany

Coordinates: 50°57′46″N 14°04′32″E

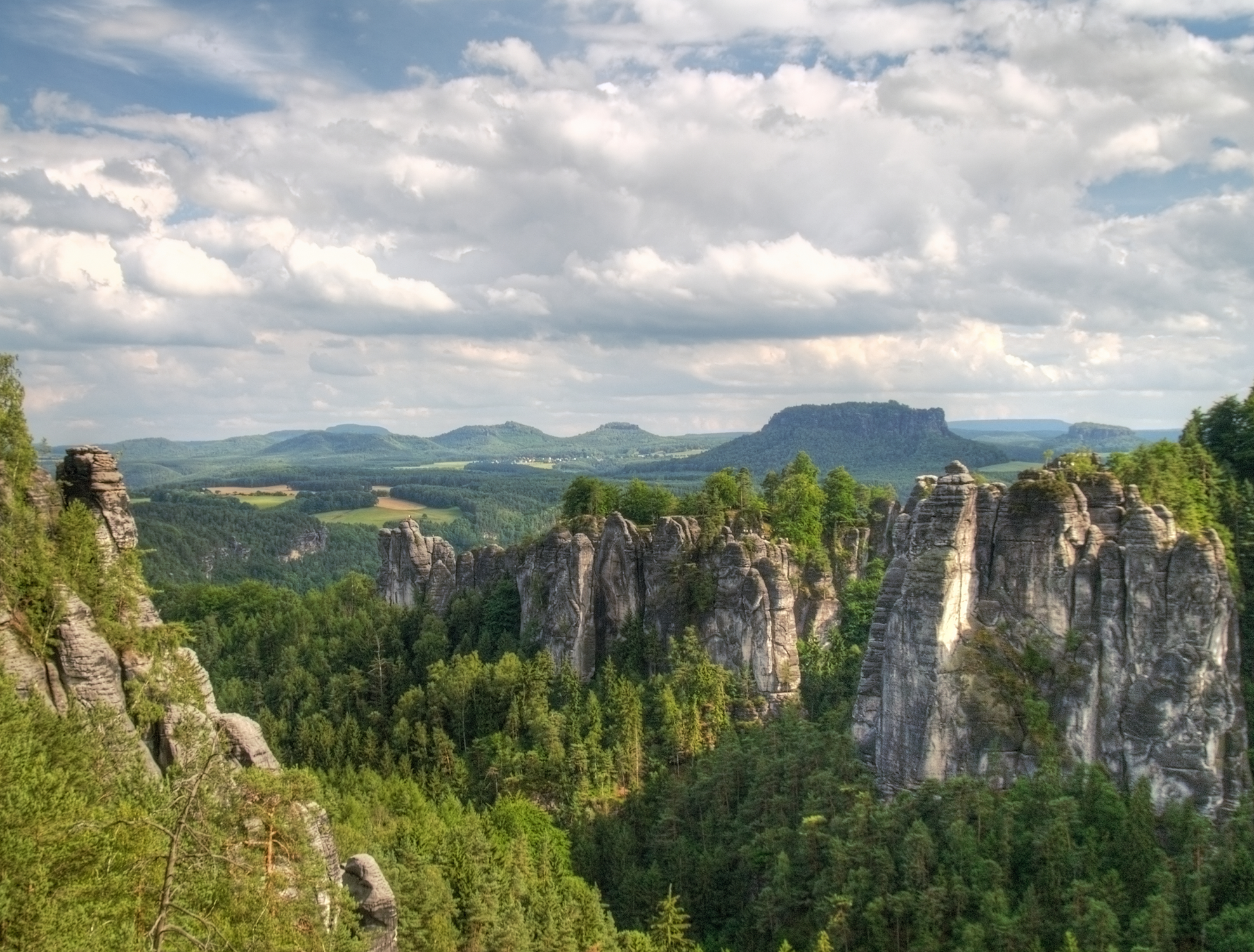
View from the Wehlgrund lookout over the Wehlgrund to the Bastei and the Lilienstein

The Wehlgrund in Saxon Switzerland in Eastern Germany is a right-hand, side valley of the Amselgrund, between the Bastei massif and the Kleiner Gans. Amongst the steep rock faces of the upper valley and the heavily divided head of the valley is the romantic and natural backdrop for the Rathen Open Air Stage. The Wehlgrundbach flows along the valley bottom and empties into the Grünbach in the Amselgrund valley a short distance above Niederrathen. North of the open air stage near the rocks of the Gänse rises the imposing Wehlnadel and, in its vicinity, are the Wehltürme rock towers. The Bastei may be reached from the Wehlgrund over the Rathen Staircase (Rathener Treppe) of 487 steps.

== See also ==
- Rock climbing in Saxon Switzerland
