= Rathen Open Air Stage =

Performance venue, Elbe

Coordinates: 50°57′49″N 14°4′29″E

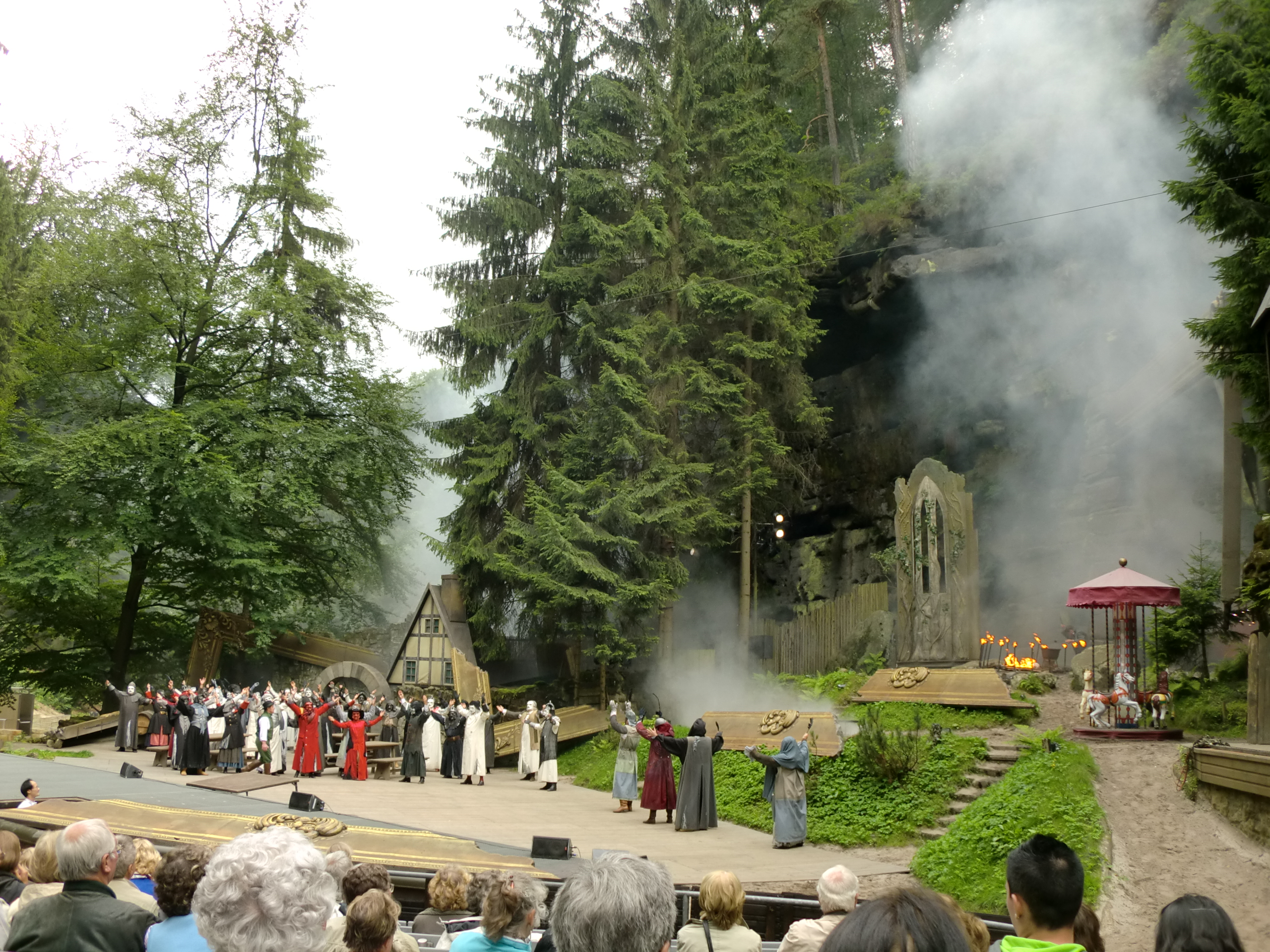
Felsenbühne Rathen Freischütz

The Rathen Open Air Stage (German: Felsenbühne Rathen) is a natural stage in Saxon Switzerland in East Germany. It is located in a hollow at the upper end of the Wehlgrund valley between the rocks of Kleine Gans and Großer Wehrturm below the famous Bastei rocks and Neurathen Castle. The entrance to the hollow branches off just above the valley's junction with the Amselgrund.

== History ==
The open-air theatre has 2,000 seats (since its expansion in 1957) and was laid out in 1936, inspired by the ideas of the Thingbewegung movement, by the municipality of Rathen for the staging of plays and concerts. It opened with Basteispiel by Kurt Arnold Findeisen.

By 1938 the first Karl May Festivals were being held. After the war the stage reopened in 1946. Since 1954 the stone stage has been used by the Landesbühnen Sachsen. In 1984 their performance of Schatz im Silbersee in an adaptation by Helmut Menschel continued the interrupted tradition of Karl May. It was followed by Winnetou (adapted by Uwe Wolf) in 1987 and Old Surehand (adapted by Olaf Hörbe) in 1995. On the 165th anniversary of Karl May's birth on 23 June 2007, the new work Der Schatz im Silbersee was launched in an adaptation by the actor and director Olaf Hörbe.

In the summer season between May and September there are up to 90 performances by the Landesbühnen Sachsen. The programme is very varied, ranging from musical theatre to plays and from classic to modern works. Traditional performances, in addition to the Karl May pieces, include Freischütz, Hänsel and Gretel and Carmina Burana.

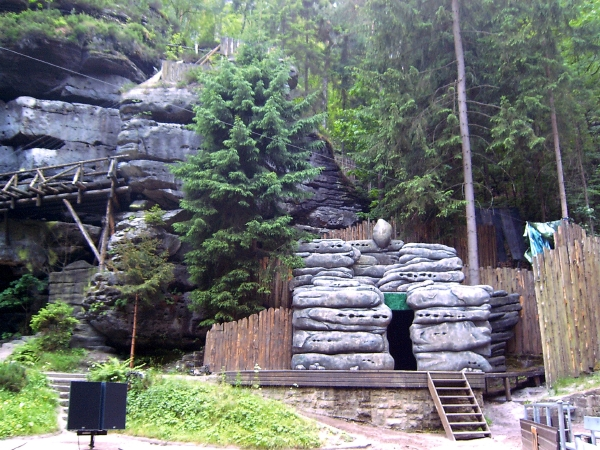
Part of the stage

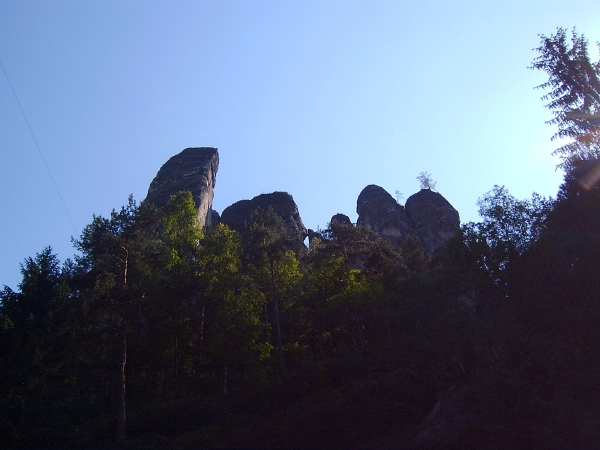
The Wehlgrund rocks are the backdrop to the stage

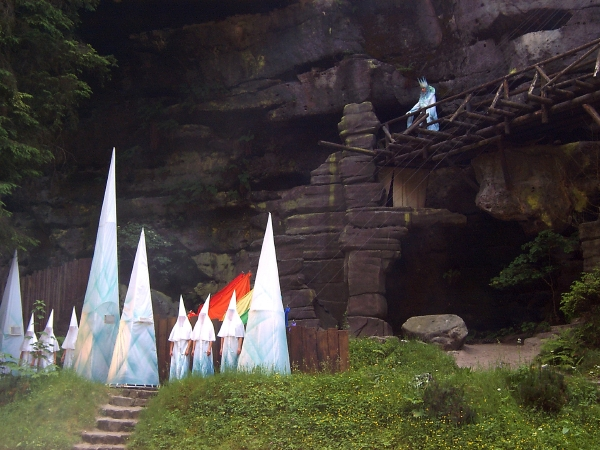
Scene from children's musical Der Regenbogen
