= Altrathen Castle =

- Burg Altrathen
- Rathen
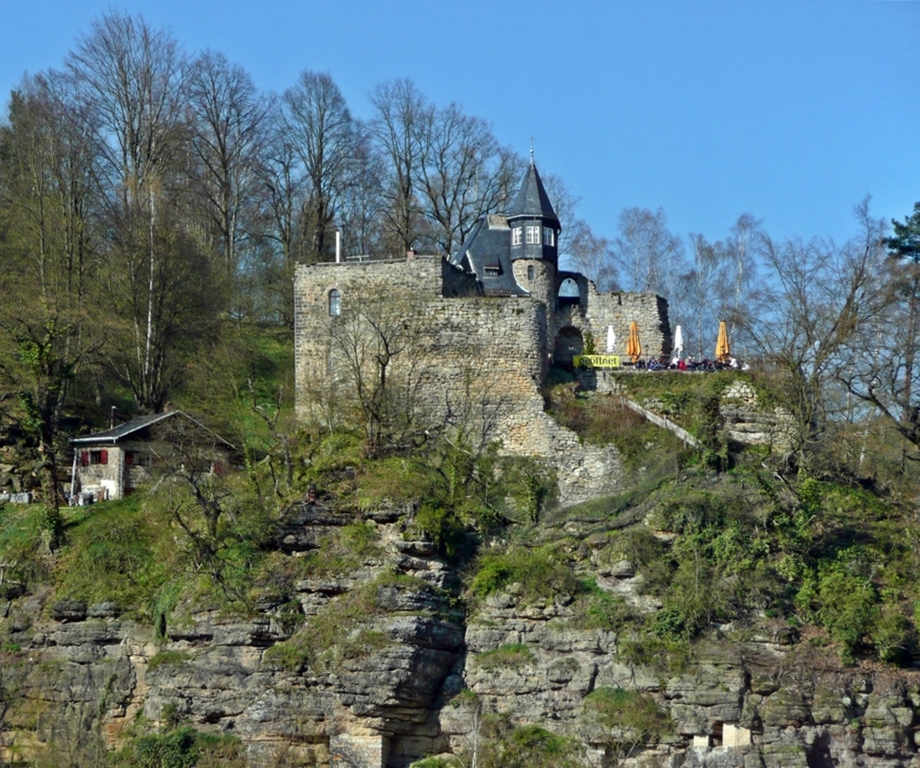
- Altrathen Castle

Site information
- Type: hilltop castle, rock castle
- Code: DE-SN
- Condition: insignificant elements survive

Location
- Coordinates: 50°57′31.8″N 14°4′50.3″E

Site history
- Built: ca. 1100

Altrathen Castle (German: Burg Altrathen) is located on a rock outcrop near Rathen in Saxon Switzerland in the German state of Saxony.

== History ==
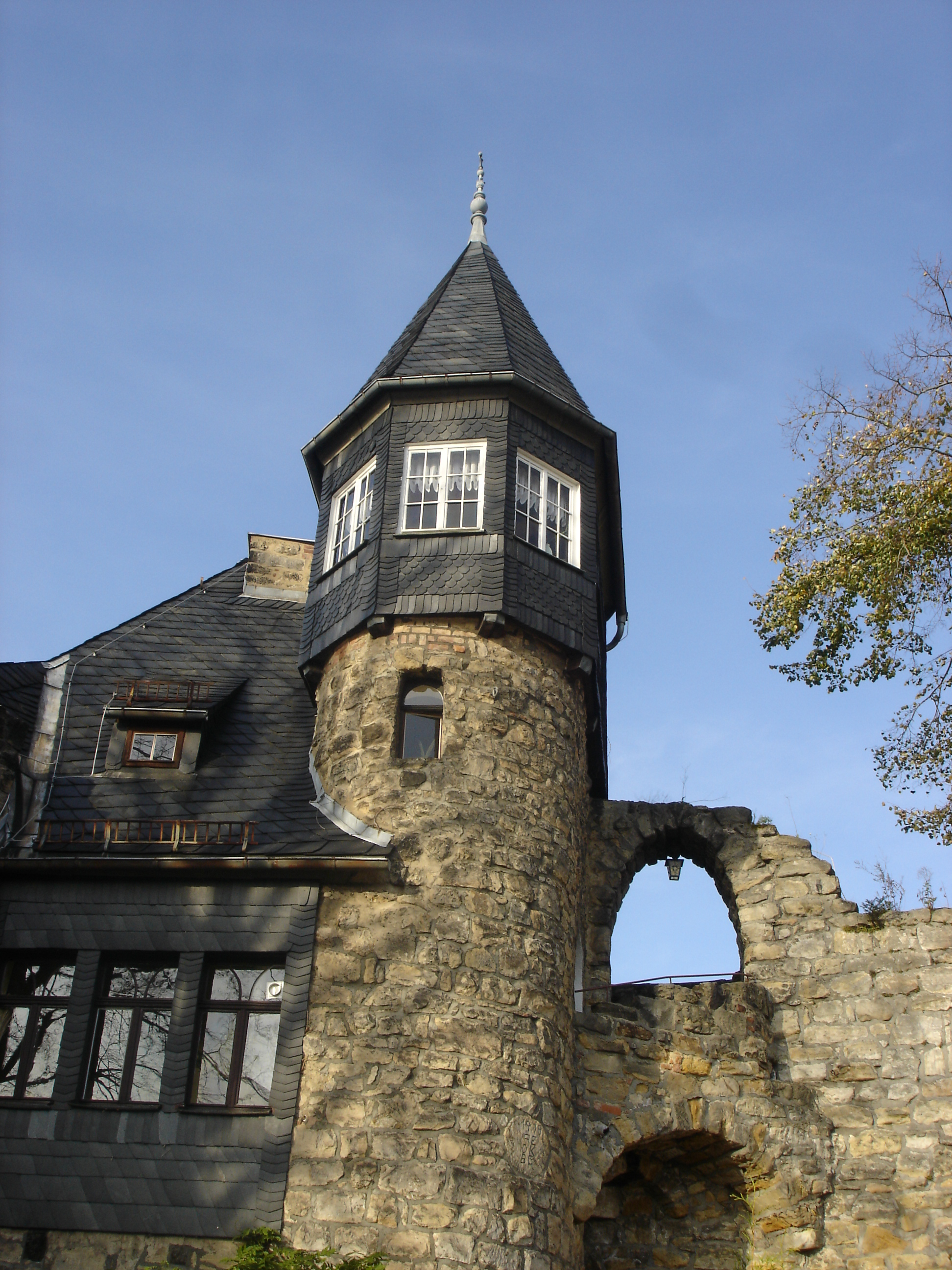

Unlike the neighbouring Neurathen Castle, very little is known about the history of this fortification. It was probably built at the same time in the 11th century. The castle was first mentioned in the records in 1289. In 1469, Altrathen and Neurathen castles were slighted.

In 1888, the industrialist Eduard Seifert bought the ruins of the castle and rebuilt it in 1893 in a Neogothic style. Of the medieval castle, only the cellars and parts of the spiral staircase of the keep have survived.

After 1945 the building acted as a works holiday home for the VEB Brau und Malz in Dresden and later for the East German state bank. In 1995 the site was sold by the Treuhandanstalt to a private owner. Since then the building has been used as a small hotel and restaurant.

== Sources ==
- Richard Vogel: Werte unsere Heimat Band 1; Gebiet Königstein Sächsische Schweiz. 2nd ed., Akademie Verlag, Berlin 1985.
