= Schwedenlöcher =

Small valley in Rathen, Switzerland

Coordinates: 50°58′10″N 14°4′25″E

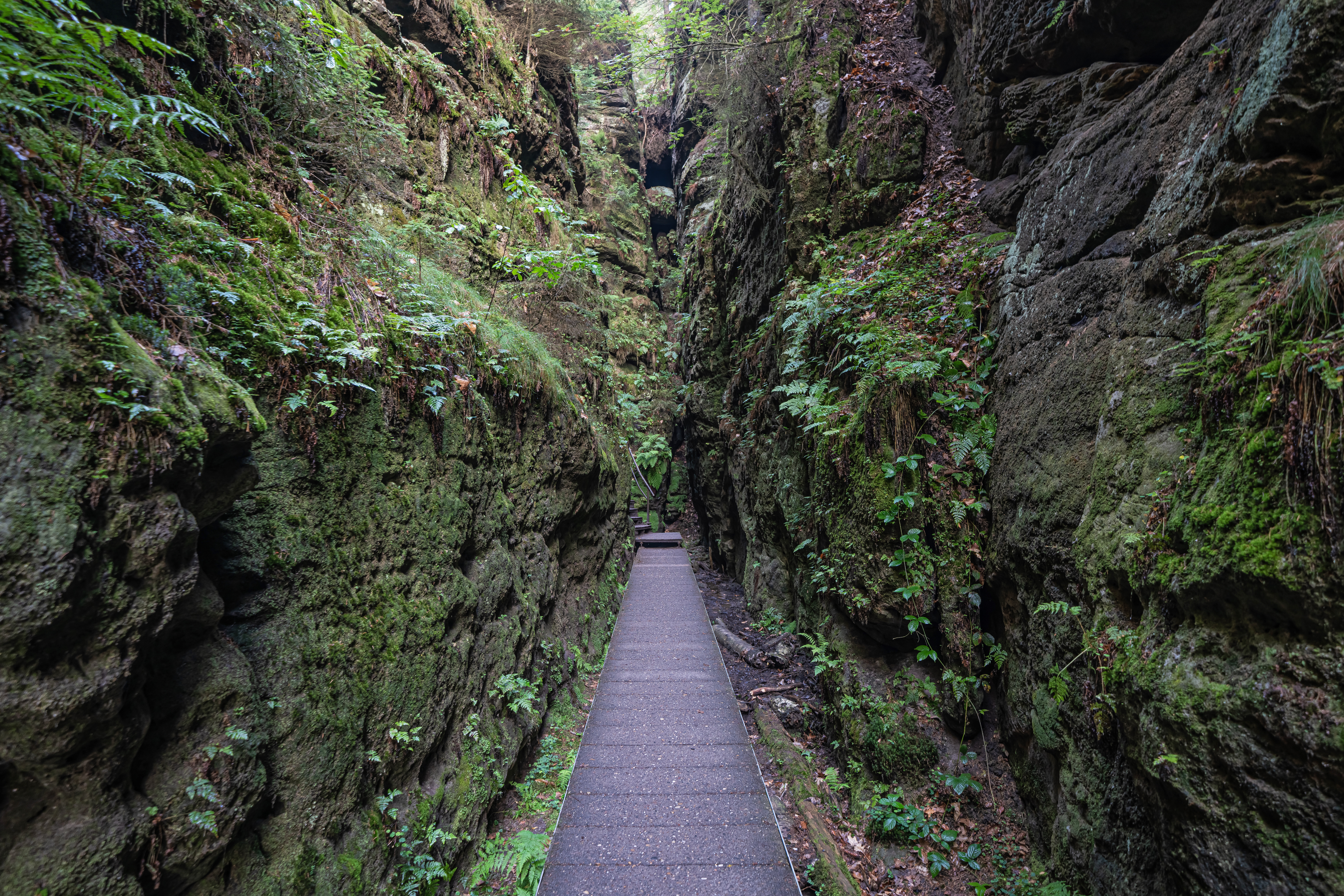
The Schwedenlöcher

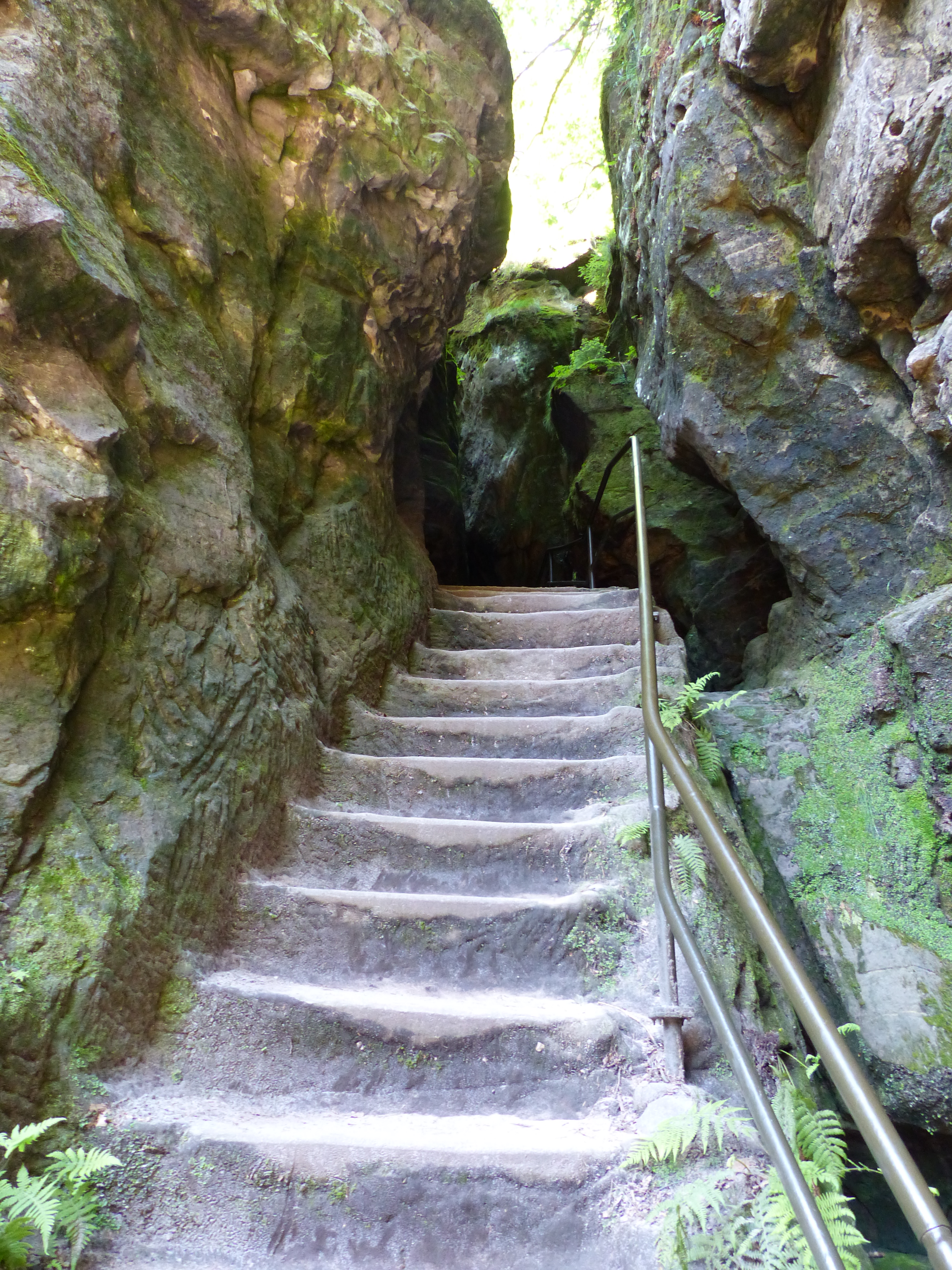
The Schwedenlöcher

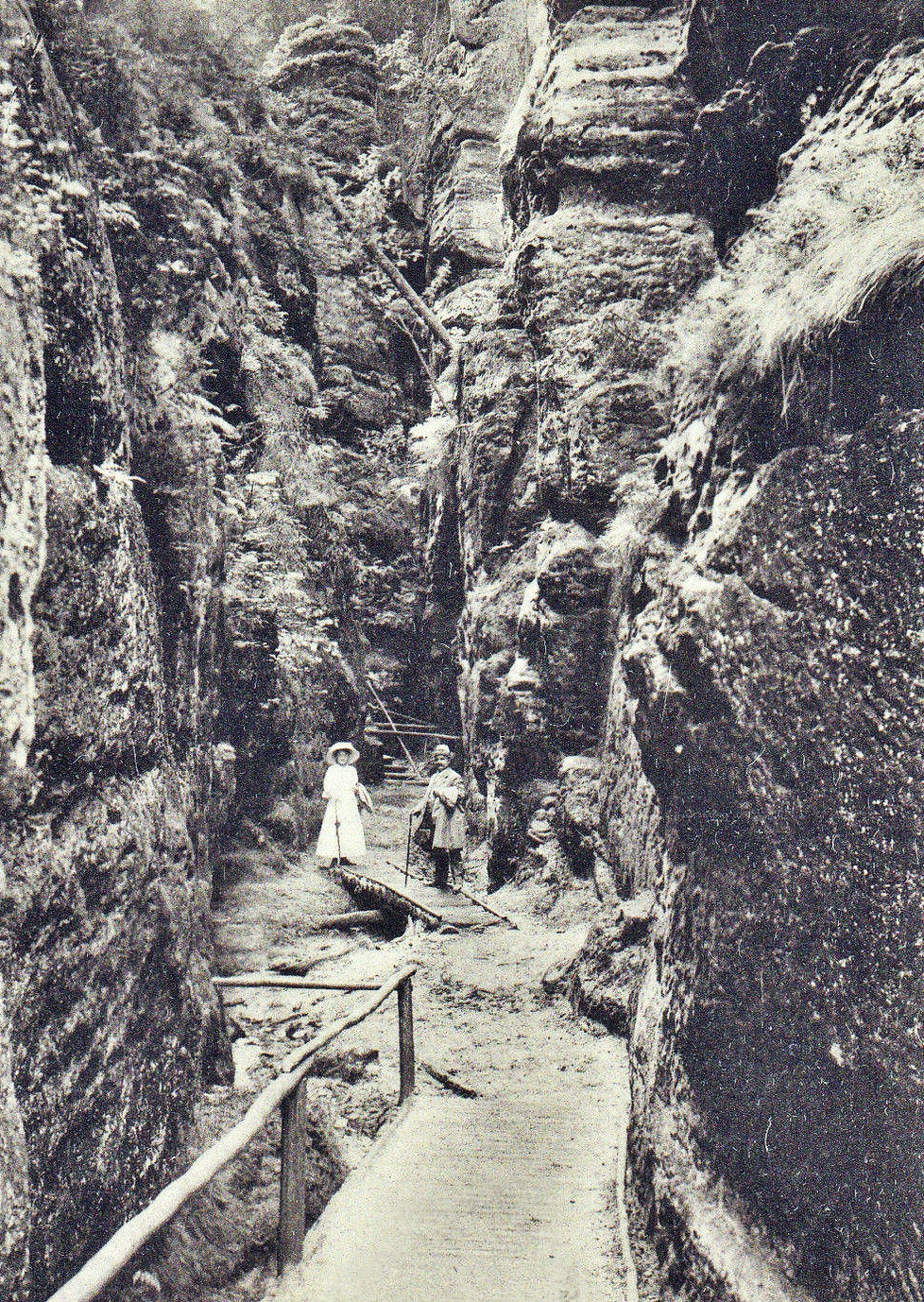
The Schwedenlöcher, historical view around 1900

The Schwedenlöcher is a gorge-like side valley of the Amselgrund near Rathen in Saxon Switzerland.

== History ==
The deeply incised ravine was formed by the erosion of the soft sandstone. Its course follows the main direction of fissuring in the Elbe sandstone.

Originally the Schwedenlöcher was an undeveloped gorge that was difficult to access and was known as the Blanker Grund. When, during the Thirty Years' War, the village of Rathewalde to the north was destroyed by Swedish soldiers in August 1639, the peasants of the region fled into the wild gorge and carried their possessions to safety. The gorge served as a refuge during later conflicts, such as in 1706 during the Great Nordic War, in 1813 during the Wars of Liberation and in 1945 during the last days of the Second World War.

In the 1780s, the first tracks were made in the Schwedenlöchern in order to extract timber. This is recalled by several dates chiselled into the sandstone (1782, 1784, 1787).

The first touristic development of the gorge occurred comparatively late on. In 1886, at the initiative of the Alpine Club for Saxon-Bohemian Switzerland, a walkway was built through the Schwedenlöcher. To build the steps and bridges the gorge had to be artificially widened in places. The new footpath, which linked the well known rock massif of the Bastei with the Amselgrund, was opened on 1 May 1886 on the occasion of the 6th German Geographers' Day. In 1967/68, comprehensive renovation was carried out on the path. This involved the construction of 3.5 tons of steel and 600 concrete slabs. The path has 777 steps and over 20 concrete bridges.

Today the footpath through the Schwedenlöcher is one of the most popular walks in Saxon Switzerland. The Saxon Switzerland National Park authorities estimate that up to 2,000 people per day walk the path during the peak season.

== Rockfalls ==
The path through the narrow gorge is often threatened by rockfalls from the eroding sandstone and has had to be closed several times.

In May 2012 a tree root broke off a large piece of rock, roughly 10 cubic metres in volume. The falling rock injured seven walkers. The path had to be closed for several days while inspections of the damage and clearance work took place. In February 2013 the gorge was closed again due to the danger of falling rock. For safety reasons in August 2013 an overhanging rock was blown up. The path had to be rerouted past the demolition site and was re-opened in September 2013.

== Climbing rocks ==
The Schwedenlöcher are part of the Saxon Switzerland Climbing Area. The climbing rock known as the Schwedenturm is next to the path. It was first climbed in 1905 by Rudolf Fehrmann and his brother Arymund.

== Literature ==
- Gebiet Königstein, Sächsische Schweiz. Edition no. 1 Akademie-Verlag Berlin, Berlin 1957 (Werte der deutschen Heimat. Vol. 1).
- Oskar Lehmann: Die Bastei in der sächsischen Schweiz. Festschrift zur hundertjährigen Jubelfeier ihres Eintritts in die Geschichte am 29. Mai 1897. Köhler, Dresden, 1897 (Digitalisat)
