= Rathen =

- Municipality
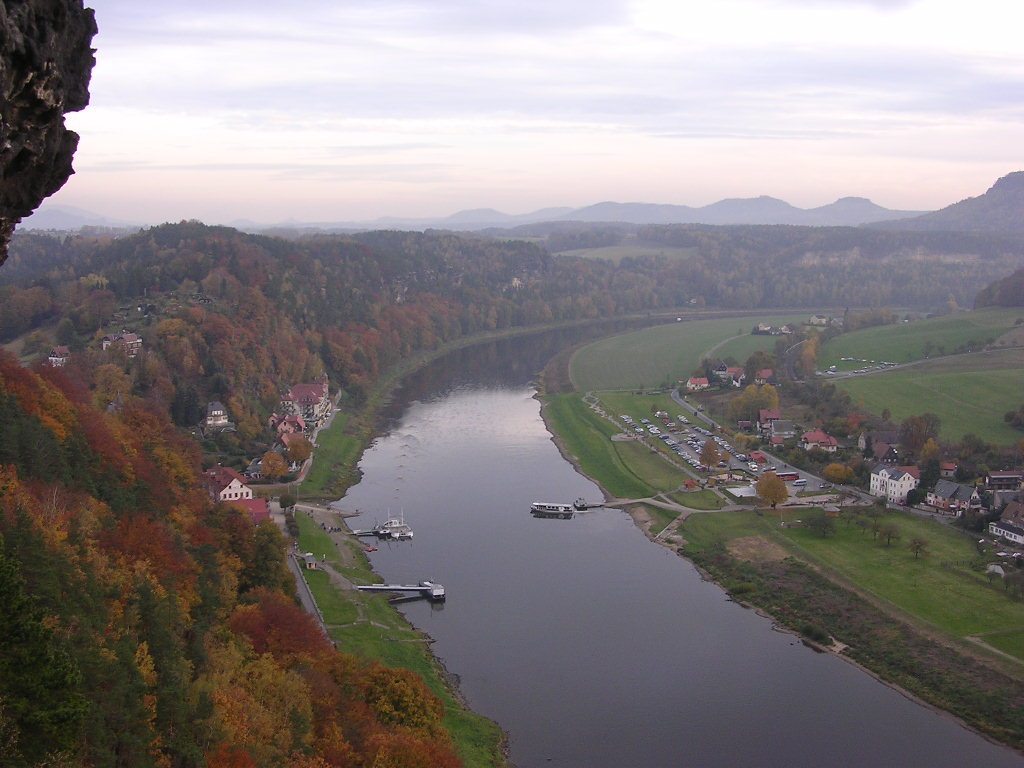

- Coat of arms

- Location of Rathen within Sächsische Schweiz-Osterzgebirge district
- Interactive map of Rathen
- Location within Germany Location within Saxony
- Coordinates: 50°57′N 14°05′E
- Country: Germany
- State: Saxony
- District: Sächsische Schweiz-Osterzgebirge
- Subdivisions: 2

Government
  - Mayor (2022–29): Roman Rolof

Area
  - Total: 3.56 km^{2} (1.37 sq mi)
- Elevation: 112 m (367 ft)

Population (2025-12-31)
  - Total: 333
  - Density: 93.5/km^{2} (242/sq mi)
- Time zone: UTC+01:00 (CET)
  - Summer (DST): UTC+02:00 (CEST)
- Postal codes: 01824
- Dialling codes: 035024
- Vehicle registration: PIR
- Website: Official website

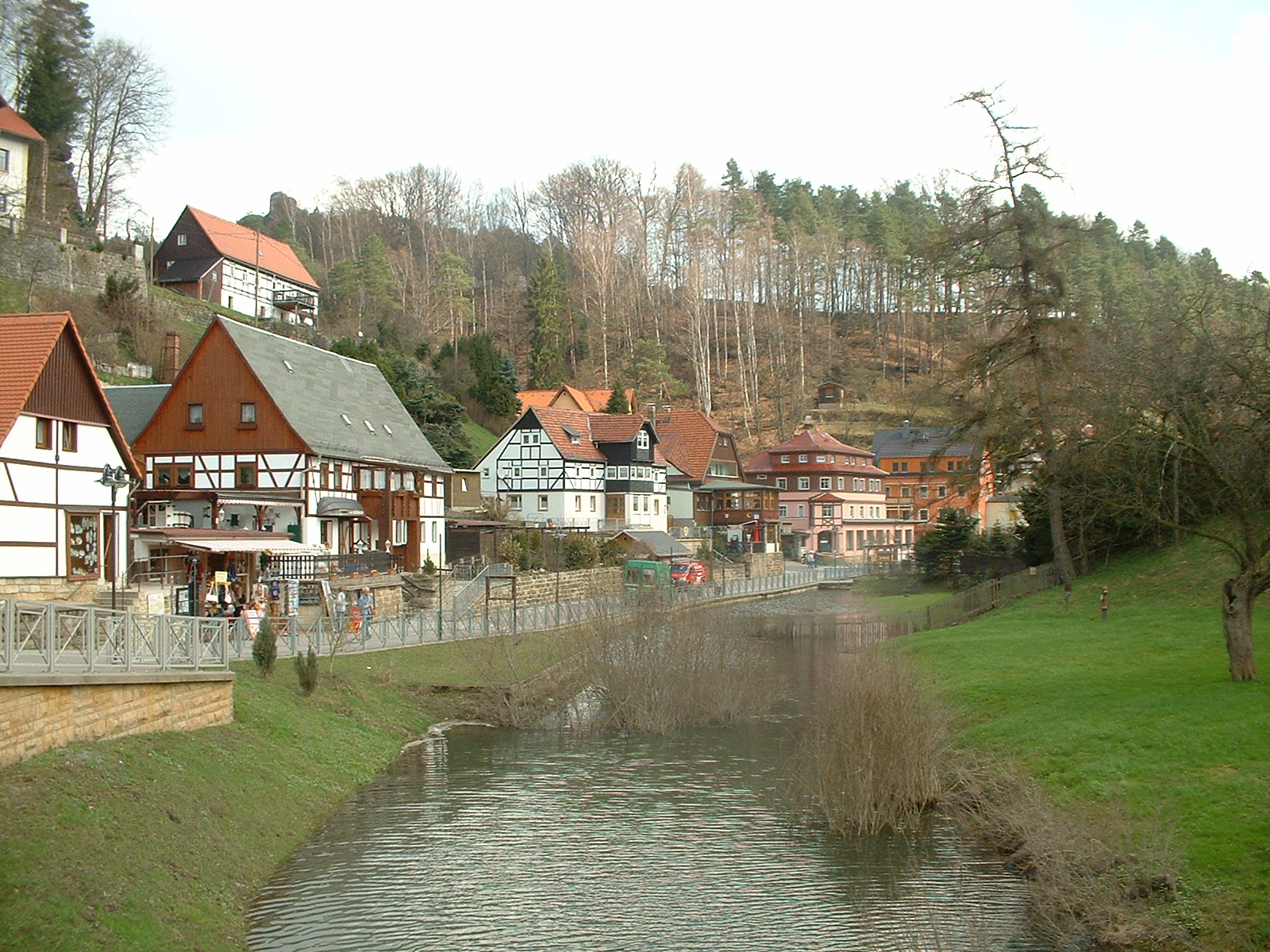
Rathen shortly after the 2006 flood

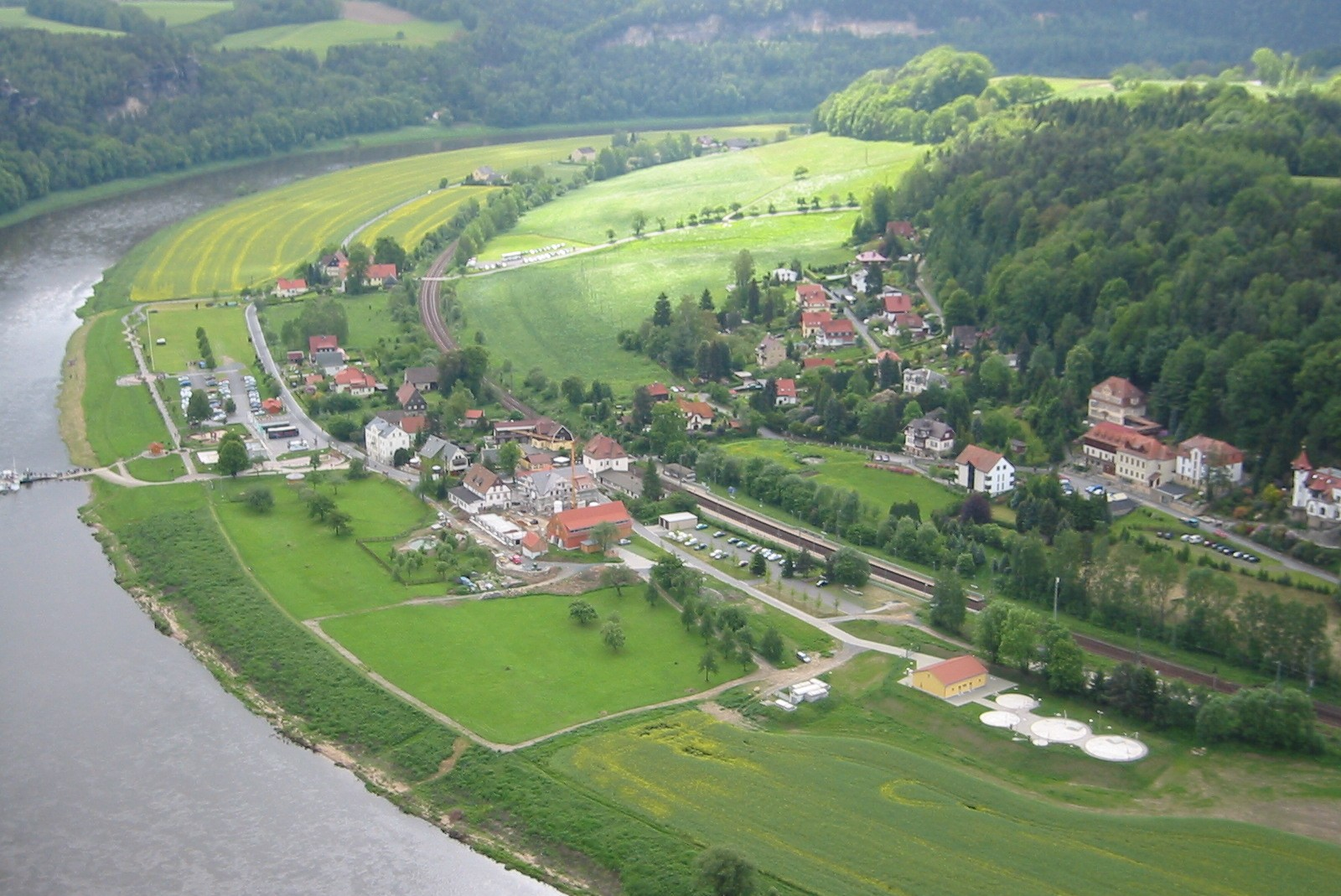
district Oberrathen - view from Bastei

Rathen (German pronunciation: [ˈʁaːtn̩]) is a village in the Elbe Sandstone Mountains, in Saxony, Germany, about 35 kilometres (22 mi) southeast of Dresden. The village occupies both banks of the river Elbe and, as of 2020, has 339 inhabitants. Rathen is a popular tourist destination, the main sights are the Bastei cliffs, the Amselsee (a lake), and the outdoor theater "Felsenbühne Rathen".

== History ==
Rathen was founded in the 13th century around 1261 as place for a castle fortress.

During World War II, a subcamp of Flossenbürg concentration camp was located here.

== Tourism ==
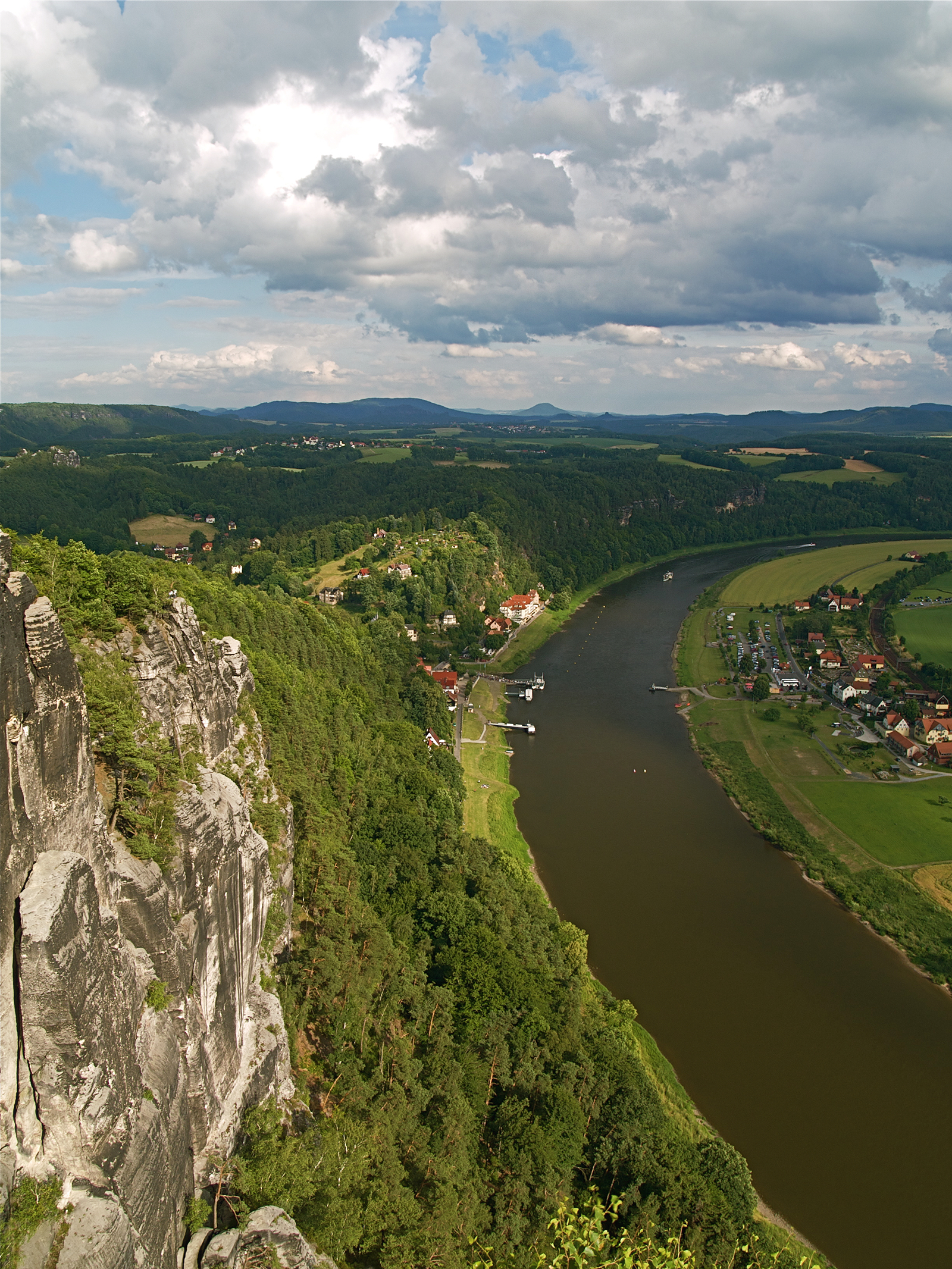
View of Rathen from the Bastei

The state-recognised climatic spa of Rathen is not only the base for tours in the western part of Saxon Switzerland, but also for the world-famous Bastei rocks. Other popular destinations in the local Amselgrund valley are the lake of Amselsee and the Rathen Open Air Stage. There are a good 400 inhabitants on both sides of the Elbe, linked by the historic Rathen Ferry, which is a protected monument. In addition to the Old Mill of 1567, which was nearly demolished after the hundred year flood, there is a range of other timber-framed houses.

Due to its proximity to the town of Wehlen the following wordplay saying is given to visitors: "Sie können Rathen wählen, ich würde Ihnen auch zu Wehlen raten." ("You can choose Rathen, I would also recommend Wehlen to you.")

=== Local places of interest ===
- Bastei with the Schweizerhaus, Bastei bridge and Bastei lookout
- Rathen Open Air Stage in the Wehlgrund
- Rhododendron park on the Kleine Bastei
- Rauenstein
- Amselgrund and Amsel Falls
- Saxon Switzerland National Park
- Castles of Neurathen and Altrathen
- Largest garden railway in the world at Eisenbahnwelten im Kurort Rathen
- Schwedenlöcher

== Transport ==
The Rathen Ferry, a passenger reaction ferry, connects Niederrathen, on the right bank of the Elbe river, to Oberrathen on the left bank. Kurort Rathen railway station, on the Dresden S-Bahn and the Dresden to Prague railway, is adjacent to the Oberrathen ferry terminal. Rathen is also a stop for the Sächsische Dampfschiffahrt ships, including historic paddle steamers, operating between Dresden and the Czech border.

Road access to Niederrathen is by means of a road from Bad Schandau, whilst Oberrathen is linked by road to Struppen. There is no direct vehicular connection across the river between the two halves of the village, and the road journey between the two is some 23 kilometres (14 mi) in length.
