= Kurort Rathen station =

Railway station in Rathen, Germany

Kurort Rathen (Kr Pirna)
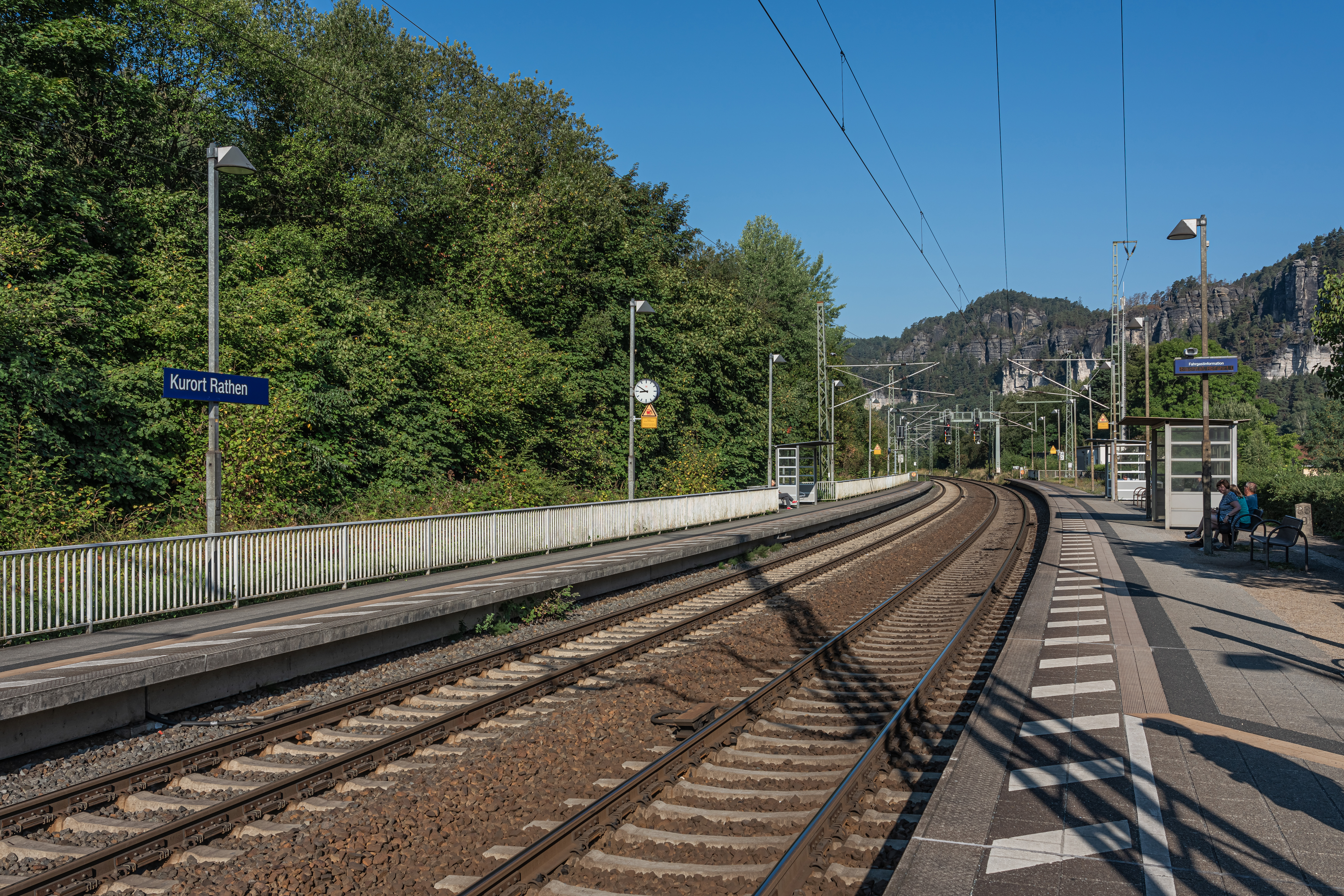
- S-Bahn train at Kurort Rathem station

General information
- Location: Germany
- Coordinates: 50.95687°N 14.07521°E
- Line: Děčín hl.n.–Dresden-Neustadt
- Platforms: 2
- Tracks: 2

Other information
- Station code: 3475
- Category: 6

Services
Preceding station	Dresden S-Bahn	Following station
Stadt Wehlen towards Meißen Triebischtal	S 1	Königstein (Sachs) towards Schöna
Location
- Location within Saxony Location within Germany Location within Europe

Kurort Rathen station serves the village of Rathen in the German state of Saxony. The station is located in the Oberrathen quarter of the village on the south bank on the Elbe on the Dresden to Děčín railway line. It is linked to the Niederrathen quarter on the other bank of the river by the Rathen Ferry, a passenger-only reaction ferry.

The station is served by the Dresden S-Bahn S1 service. Trains run to Pirna, Dresden and Meißen in one direction, and to Bad Schandau and Schöna in the other direction. The service provides two trains per hour in both directions for most of each day.
