= Amselsee =

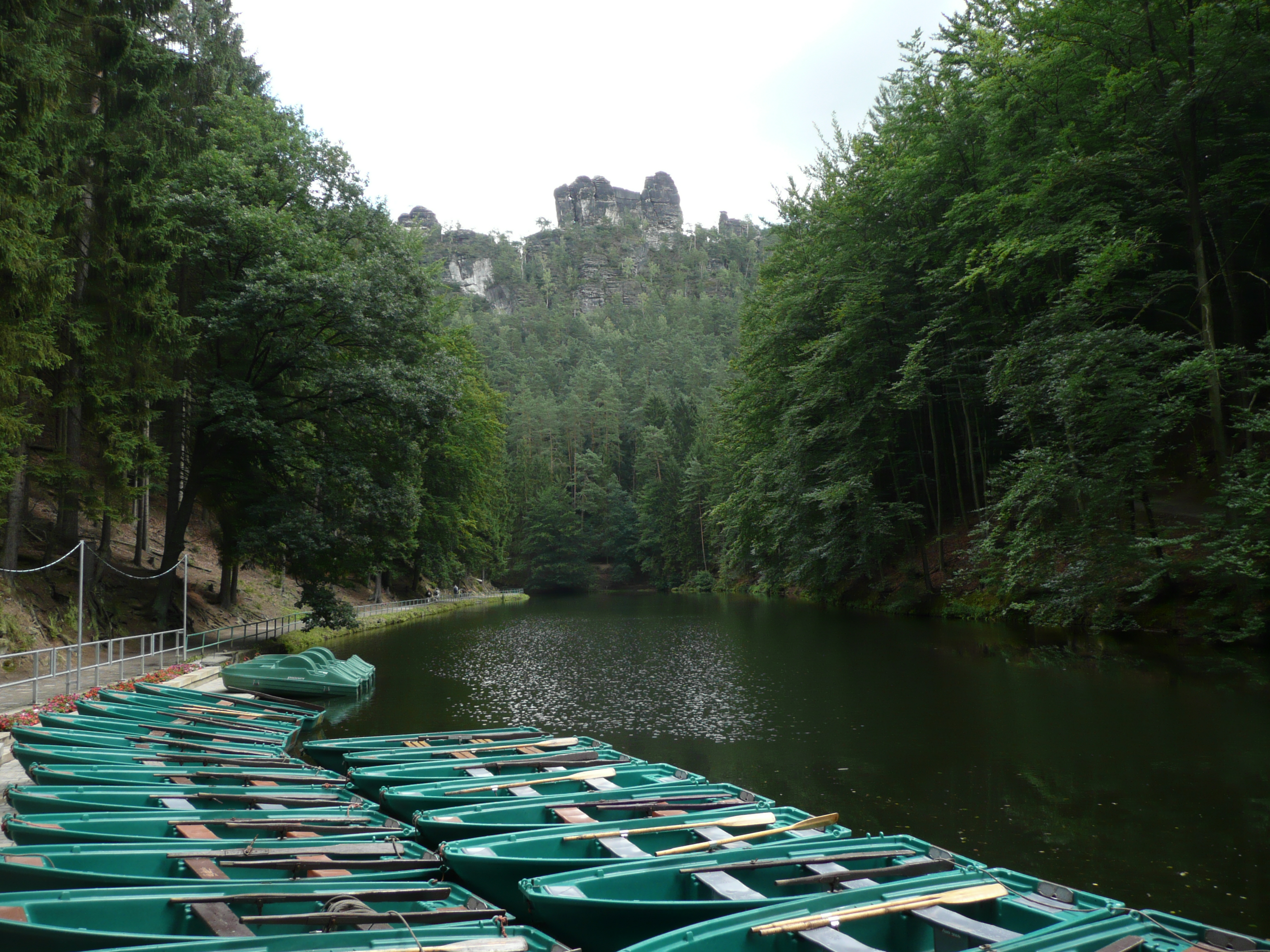
- View over the Amselsee
- Interactive map of Amselsee
- Location: Saxon Switzerland
- Coordinates: 50°57′55″N 14°04′54″E
- Construction began: 1934

Dam and spillways
- Impounds: Grünbach
- Height (thalweg): 5.5 m (18 ft) (with parapet wall)
- Length: 38 m (125 ft)
- Width (crest): 1.2 m (3 ft 11 in)

Reservoir
- Active capacity: 19,600 m^{3} (15.9 acre⋅ft)
- Surface area: 0.012 ha (0.030 acres)
- Maximum length: 0.55 m (1 ft 10 in)
- Normal elevation: 125.7 m (412 ft)

The Amselsee (also Amselsee Rathen) is a small reservoir in the spa town of Rathen in Saxon Switzerland. It is located in the Free State of Saxony in Eastern Germany.

== Reservoir ==
The Amselsee Reservoir in Saxon Switzerland, was formed in 1934 by the municipality of Rathen when it impounded the Grünbach (or Amselgrundbach) stream (the main waterbody in the Amselgrund valley,) just above its confluence with the Wehlgrund valley. The dam is around five metres high. At 127 meters above sea level the curved, narrow, roughly 550- meter-long trout pond is used in the summer for boat rides (using slot machines!) as well as for fish breeding. It also provides flood prevention. Round trips have been possible since 1969. The trout stock is sometimes mixed with American rainbow trout. Amongst the lakeside vegetation broad-winged damselflies or demoiselles may be seen.

== Dam ==
The barrier is a straight gravity dam made of rubble stone masonry. It was built in 1934 and taken into service in 1935. According to an article in the Sächsische Zeitung of 31 July 2004 the period of construction lasted from 21 July 1934 to 19 December 1934. It has a drainage outlet with a diameter of 50 cm and a flood spillway with seven openings, each two meters wide, in the centre of the dam.

== Gallery ==
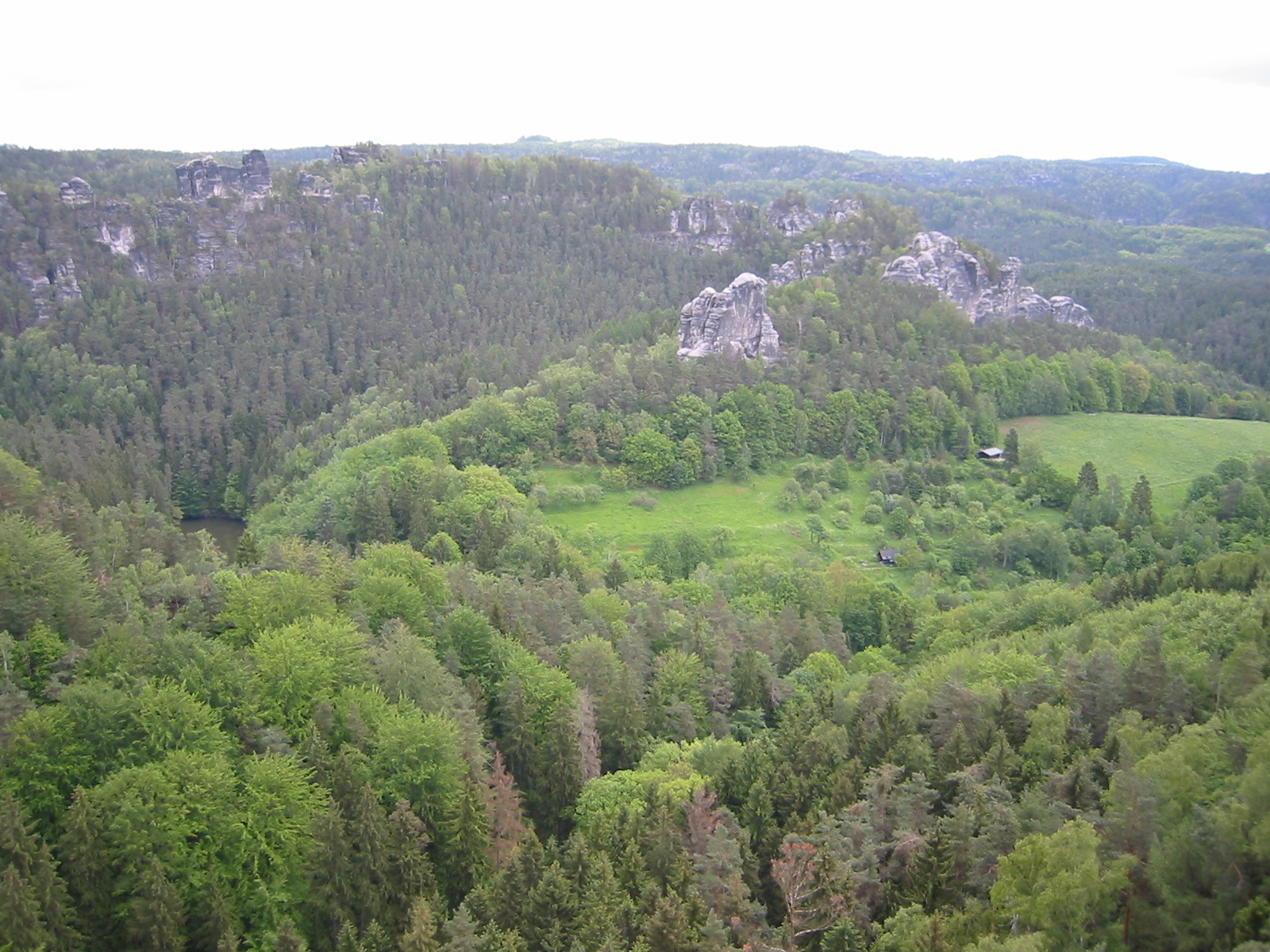
The Amselgrund with the Amselsee, Lokomotive and the Talwächter

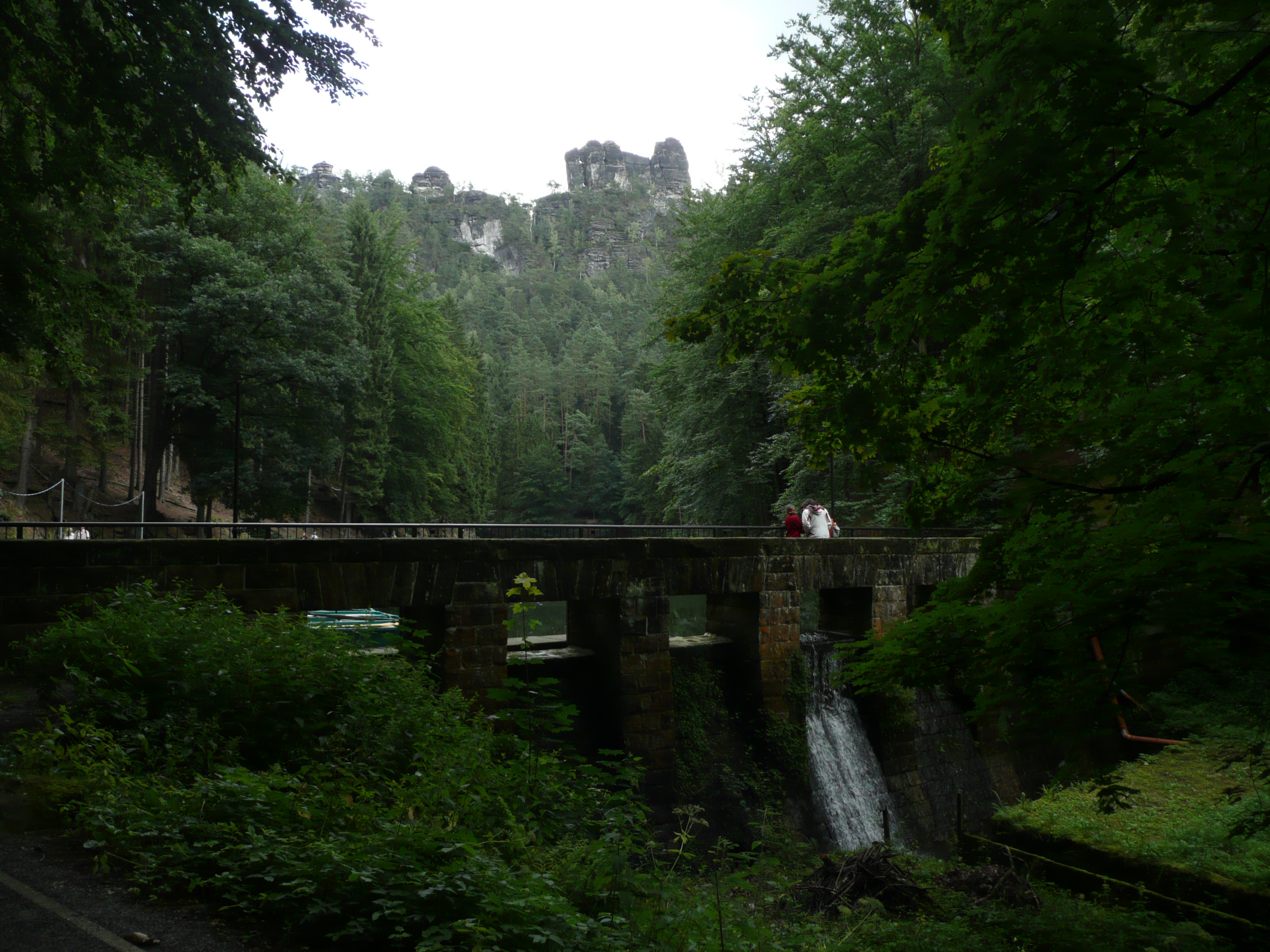
View of the dam
