= Amsel Falls =

Waterfall in Saxon Switzerland

Coordinates: 50°58′15″N 14°4′31″E

The Amsel Falls (German: Amselfall) is a waterfall in Saxon Switzerland in East Germany, roughly a kilometre north of the famous Bastei crags.

As the Grünbach stream passes through a particularly narrow, gorge-like section of the Amselgrund valley it plunges over the largest step in the river bed—roughly 10 m high—forming a wide spray of water that pours over the Amselloch, a collapsed cave. The roof of this 15-metre-long (49 ft) cave was made of sandstone blocks that have collapsed. In the ravine and in the cave potholes and kolks bear witness to the meltwaters that coursed down into the River Elbe during earlier ice ages.

The original stream (first mentioned in 1548) flowed almost entirely through the cave, but in the 19th century it had been diverted over the top of the cave to the cascade site. The waterfall was additionally, like the Lichtenhain Waterfall, arranged to flow through a small, controllable weir wicket in order to produce a stream-like torrent, in order to enhance its touristic attraction. In the immediate vicinity of the waterfall is the Amselfall mountain hut with an inn and next to it is the information office of the Saxon Switzerland National Park opened in 1992. It is open from April to October, but closed in winter.

As one of the first artists, who captured the beauty of Saxon Switzerland along the so-called Artists' Way (Malerweg), Christian Gottlob Hammer painted the Amsel Falls.

== Gallery ==
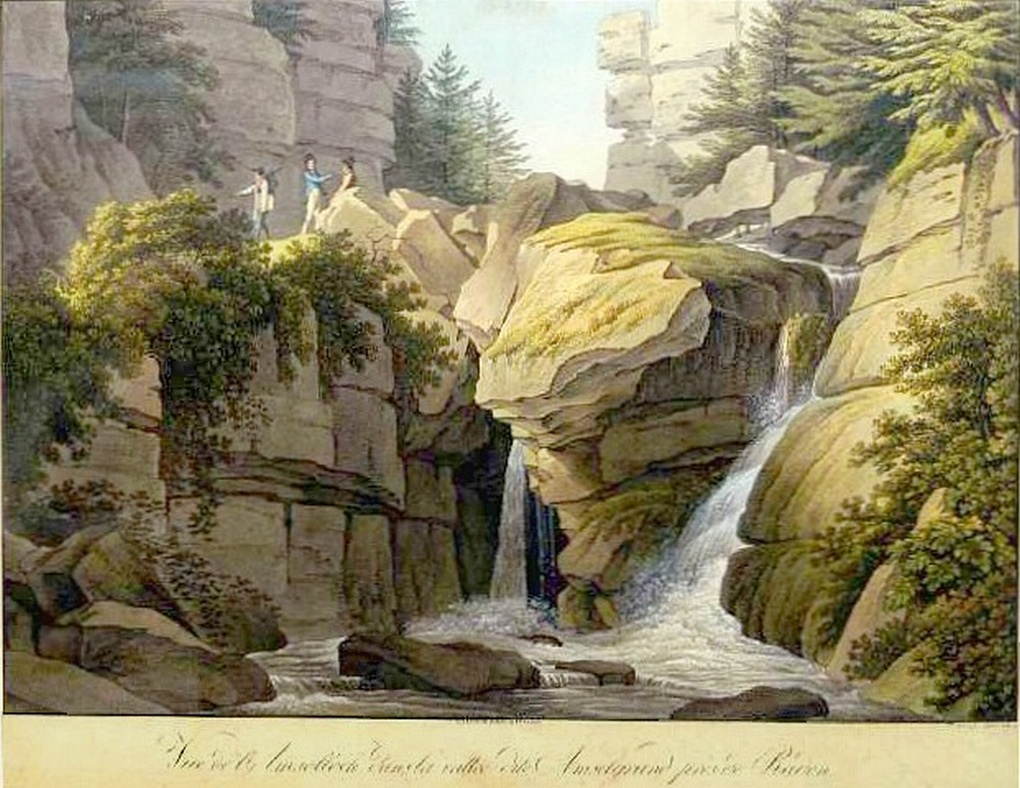
The Amsel Falls ca. 1820

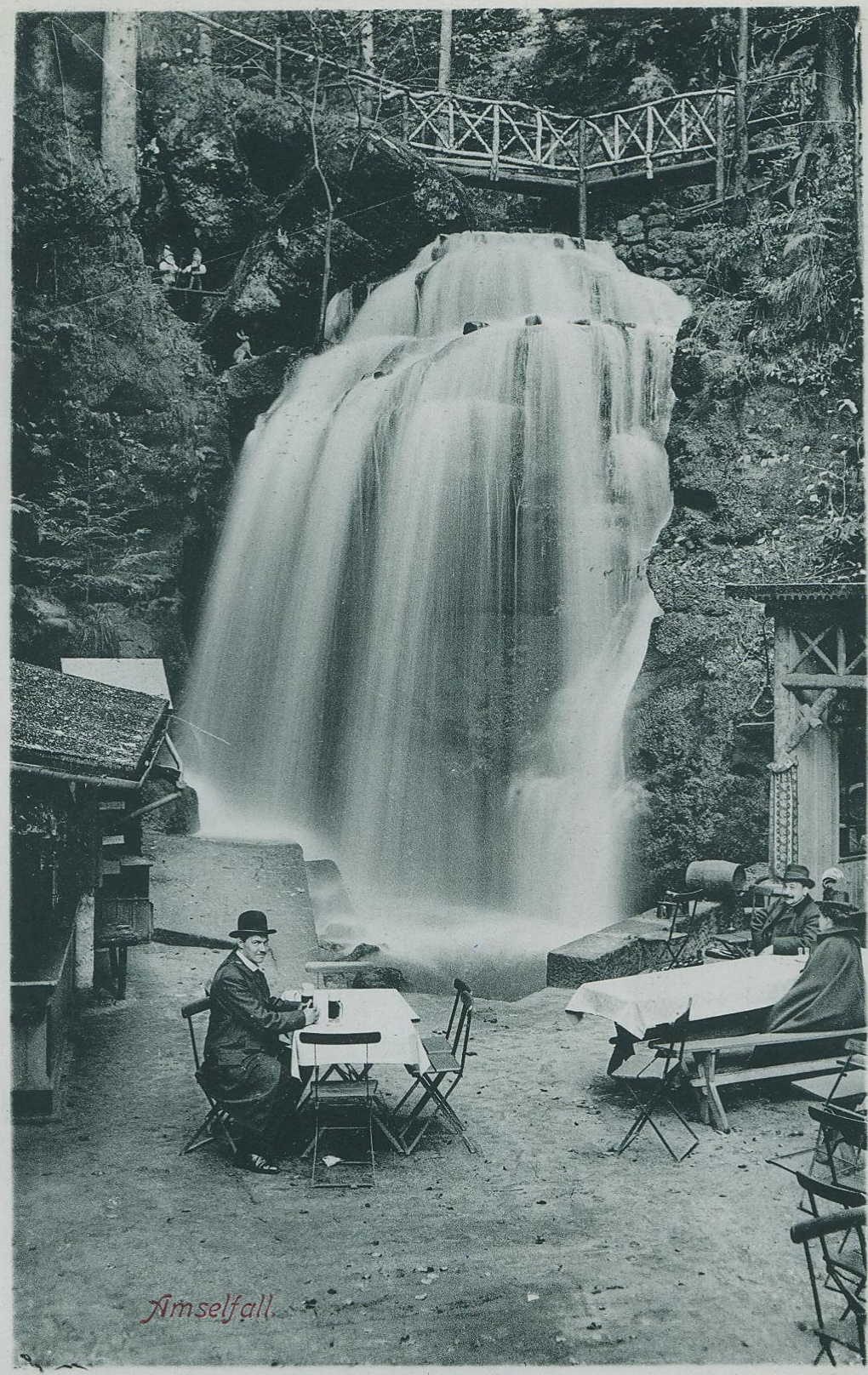
The Amsel Falls ca. 1900

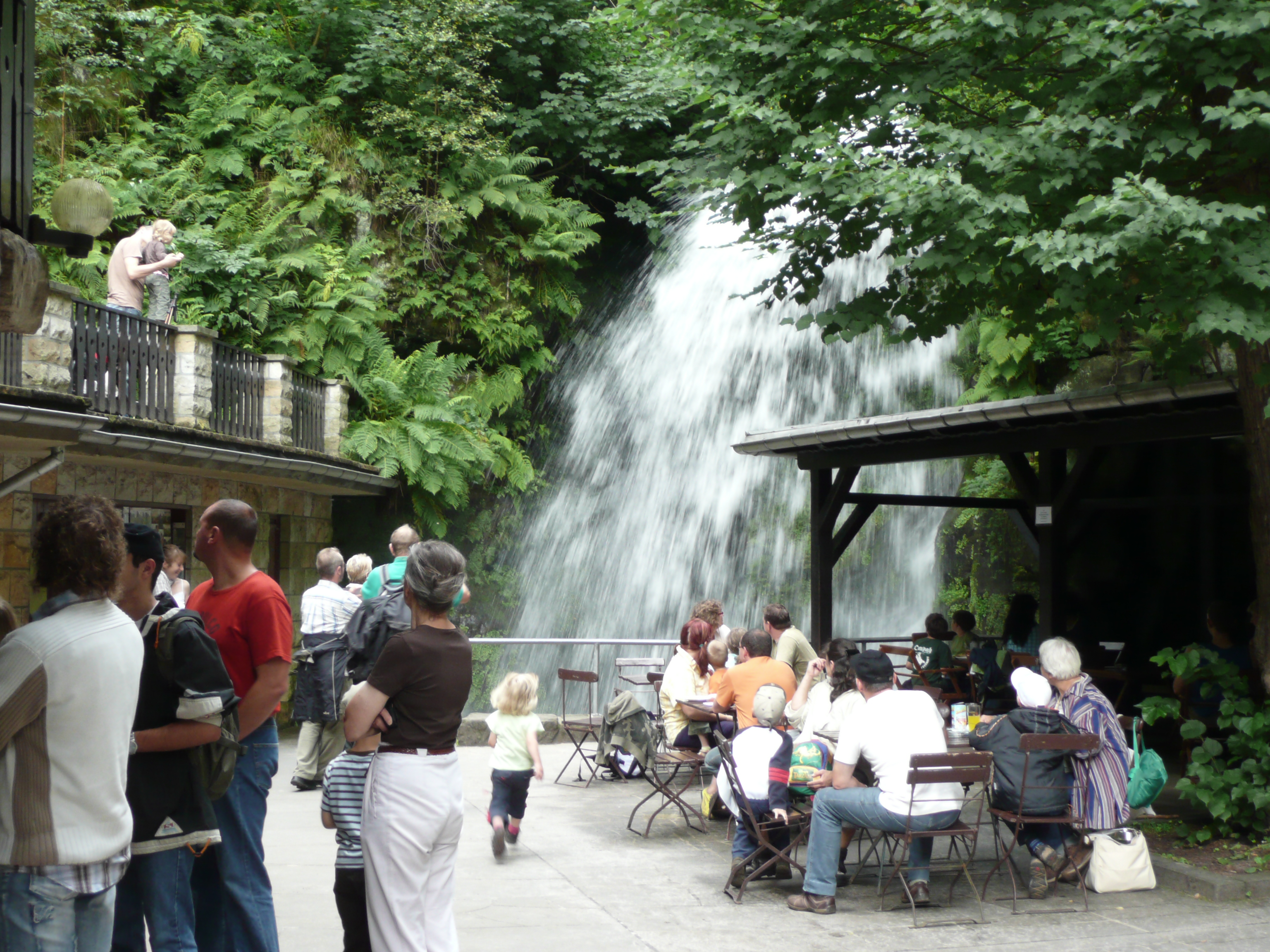
The Amsel Falls in 2008

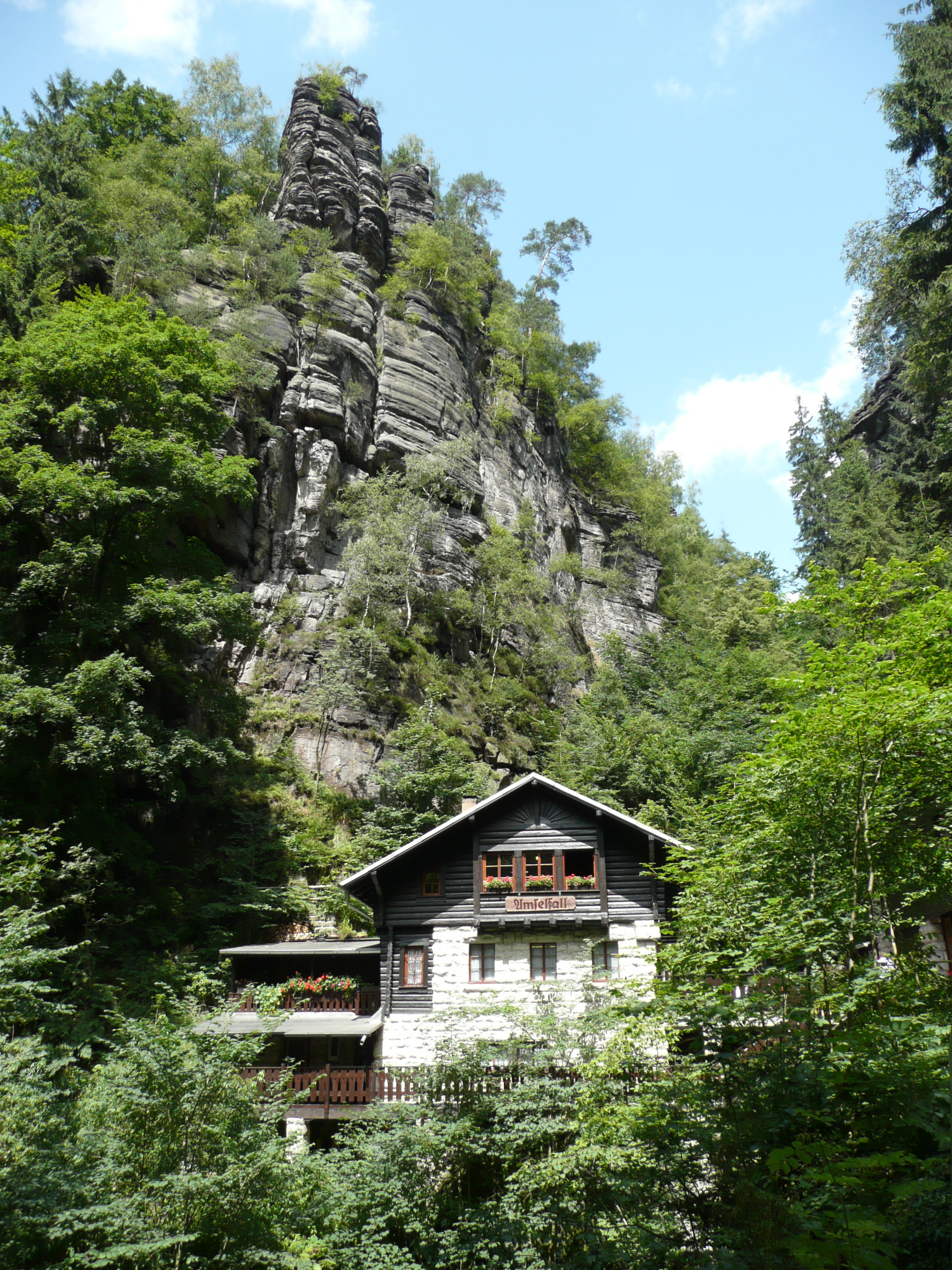
The Amselfall mountain hut in 2008

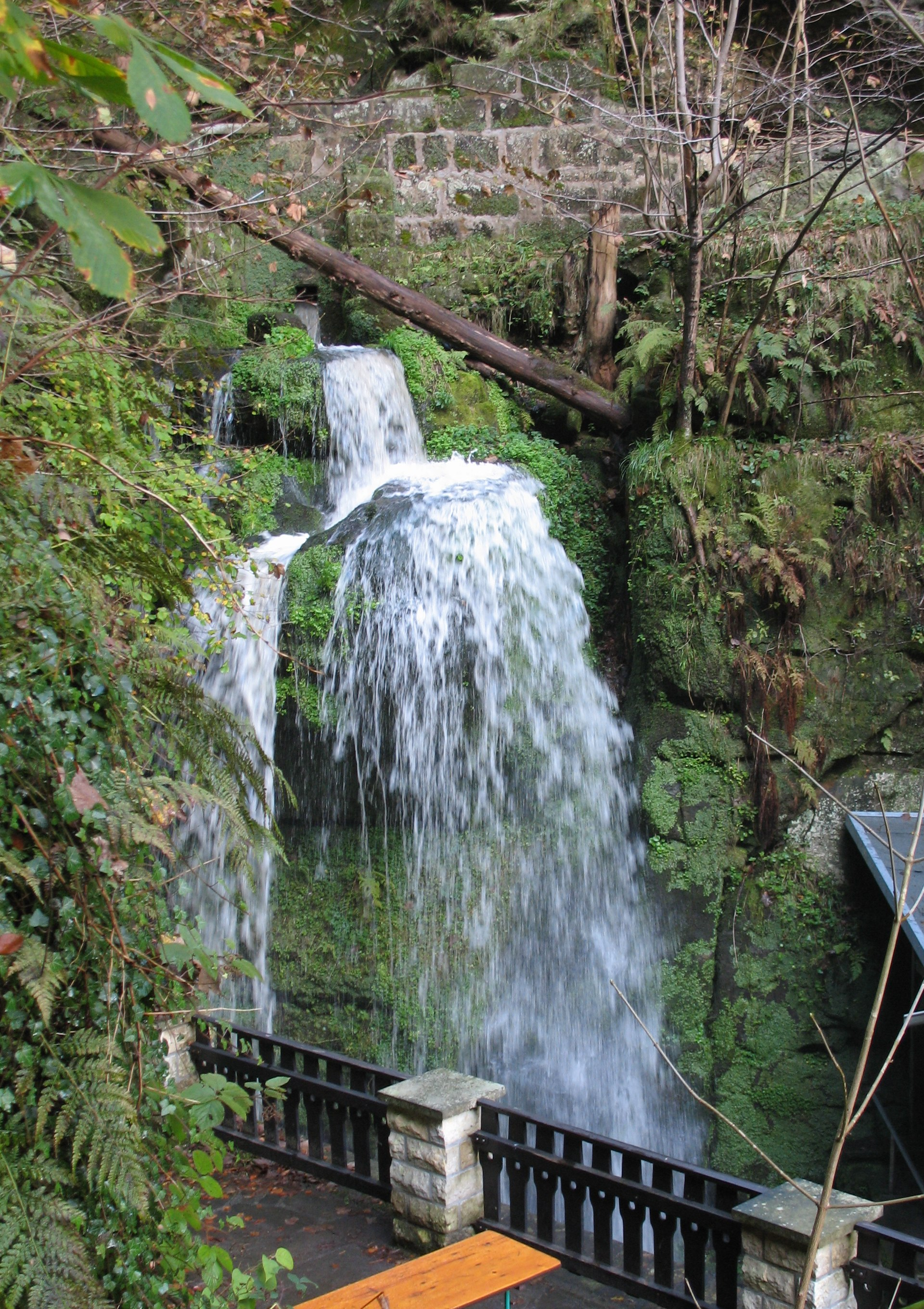
The Amsel Falls 2014

== See also ==
- Waterfalls in Germany
