= Christian August Gottlob Eberhard =

German miscellaneous writer (1769–1845)

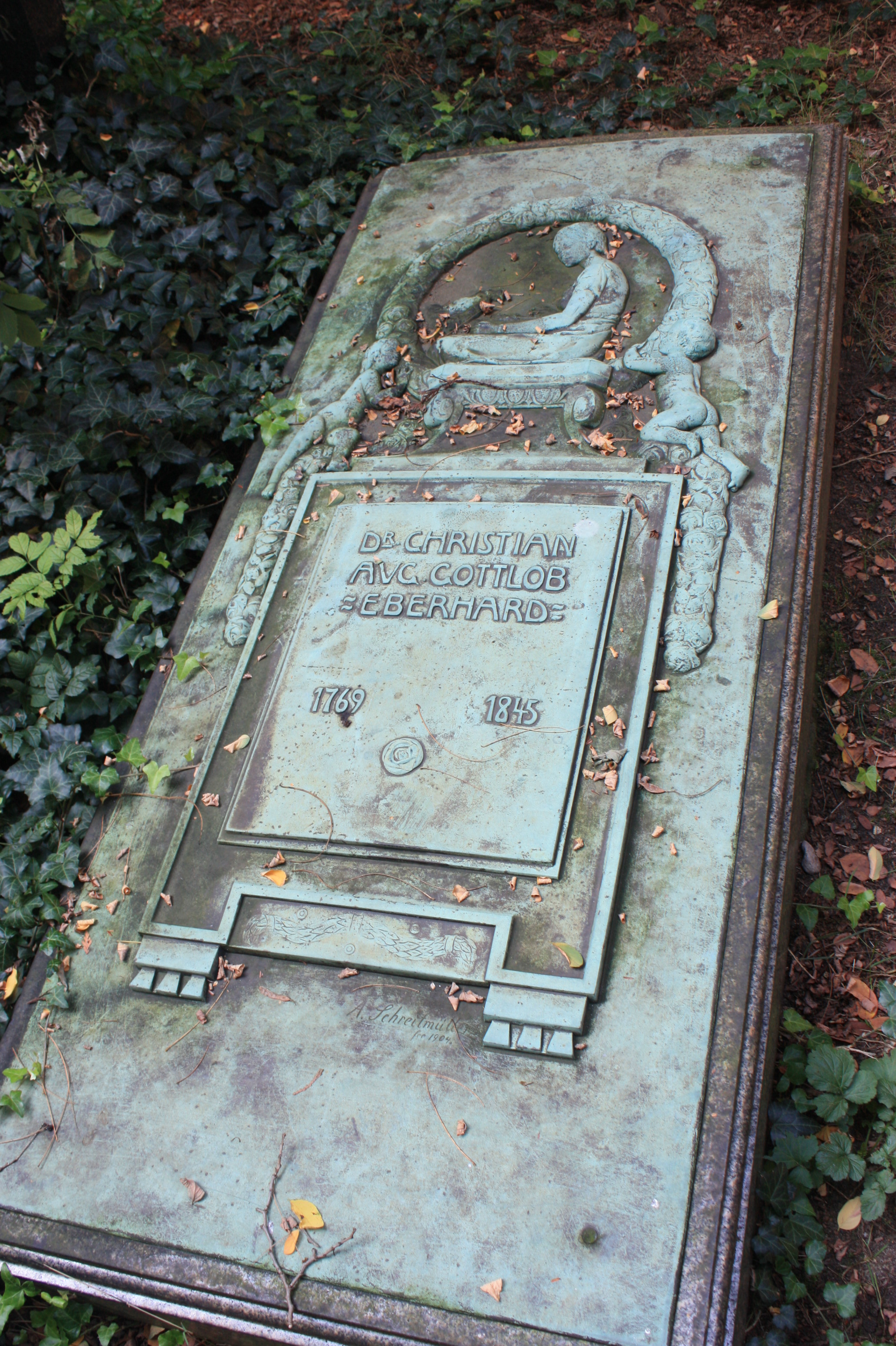
The grave of Dr Christian Eberhard in north Dresden

Christian August Gottlob Eberhard (12 January 1769 – 13 May 1845) was a German miscellaneous writer.

He was born at Belzig, in the Electorate of Saxony. He studied theology at Leipzig; but, having had a story successfully published in a periodical, he began a career in literature. With the exception of Hannchen und die Küchlein (1822), a narrative poem in ten parts, and an epic on the creation, Der erste Mensch und die Erde (1828), Eberhard's work was ephemeral in character and is now forgotten. He died at Dresden.

His collected works (Gesammelte Schriften) appeared in 20 volumes in 1830–1831.
