= Neurathen Castle =

Rock castle in Saxony, Germany

- Felsenburg Neurathen
- Rathen
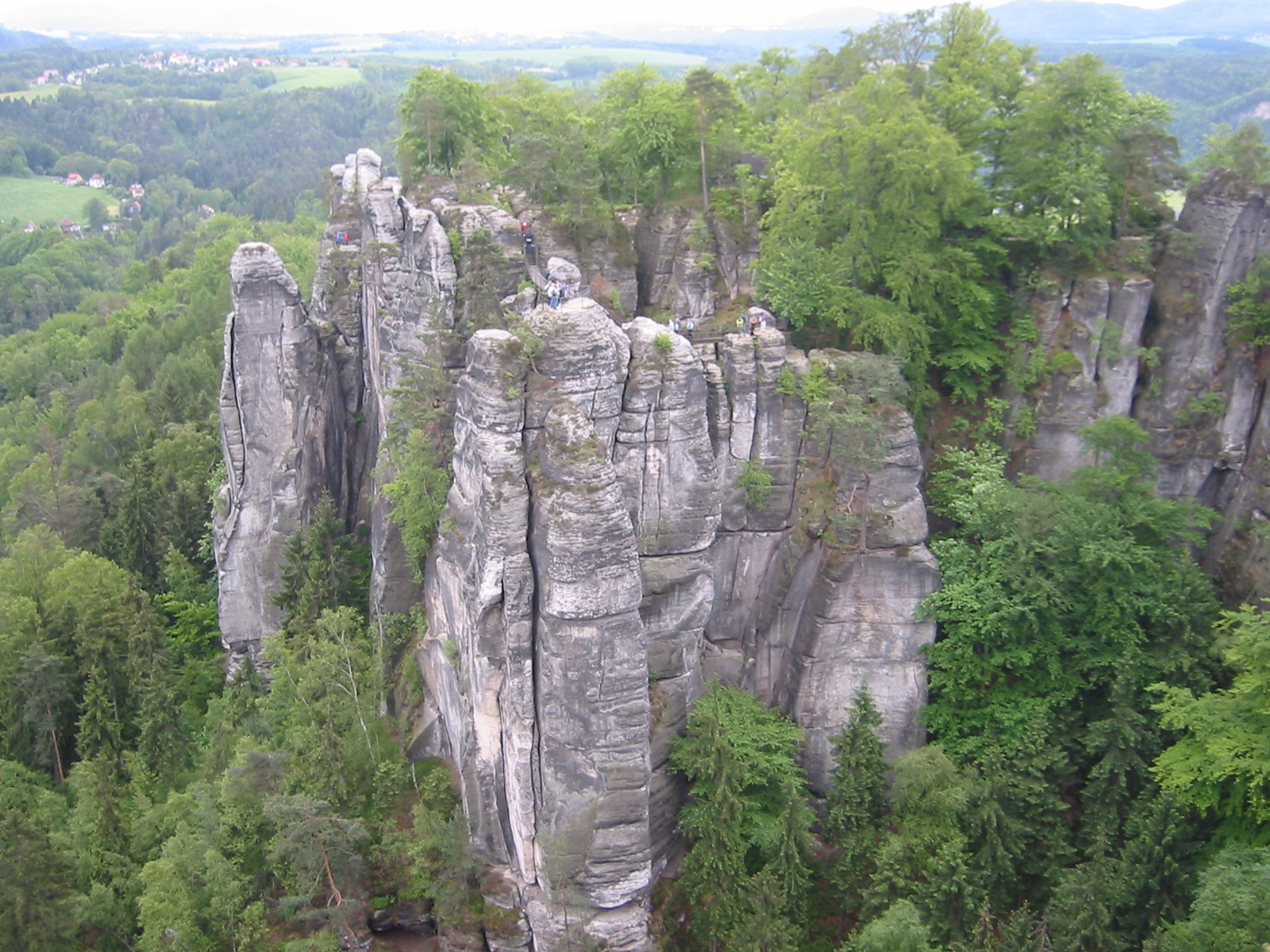
- Neurathen Rock Castle

Site information
- Type: hill castle, rock castle
- Code: DE-SN
- Condition: Wall ruins, rock chambers

Location
- Location within Germany
- Coordinates: 50°57′42″N 14°04′28″E
- Height: Height missing, see template documentation

Site history
- Built: 1100 to 1200

Garrison information
- Occupants: nobility

Neurathen Castle (German: Felsenburg Neurathen), which was first mentioned by this name in 1755, is located near the famous Bastei rocks near Rathen in Saxon Switzerland in the German state of Saxony. This was once the largest rock castle in the region, but today only the rooms carved out of the rock, passages, the cistern and the beam supports of the former wooden superstructure have survived. In the years 1982–1984 parts of the extensive castle were used to build the open-air museum.

== See also ==
- List of castles in Saxony
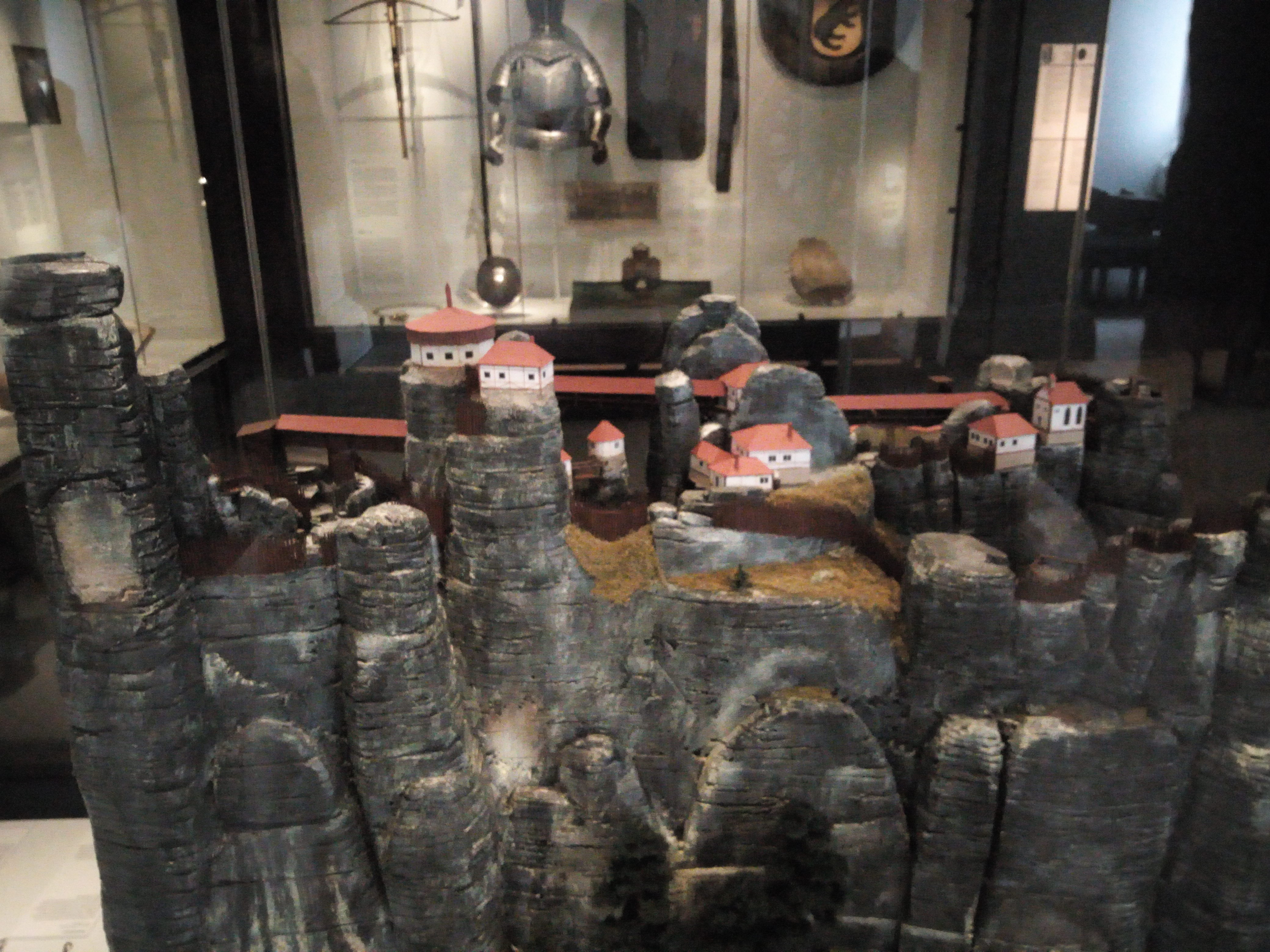
  Model of Neurathen Castle

== Sources ==
- Anne Müller, Matthias Weinhold: Felsenburgen der Sächsischen Schweiz. Neurathen - Winterstein - Arnstein. Reihe Burgen, Schlösser und Wehrbauten in Mitteleuropa Band 23, Verlag Schnell und Steiner, Regensburg 2010, ISBN 978-3-7954-2303-2
- Richard Vogel: Gebiet Königstein Sächsische Schweiz. Reihe Werte unserer Heimat Band 1, Akademie Verlag, Berlin, 2. Auflage 1985
