= Bastei =

Rock formation in Germany

Coordinates: 50°57′44″N 14°4′17″E

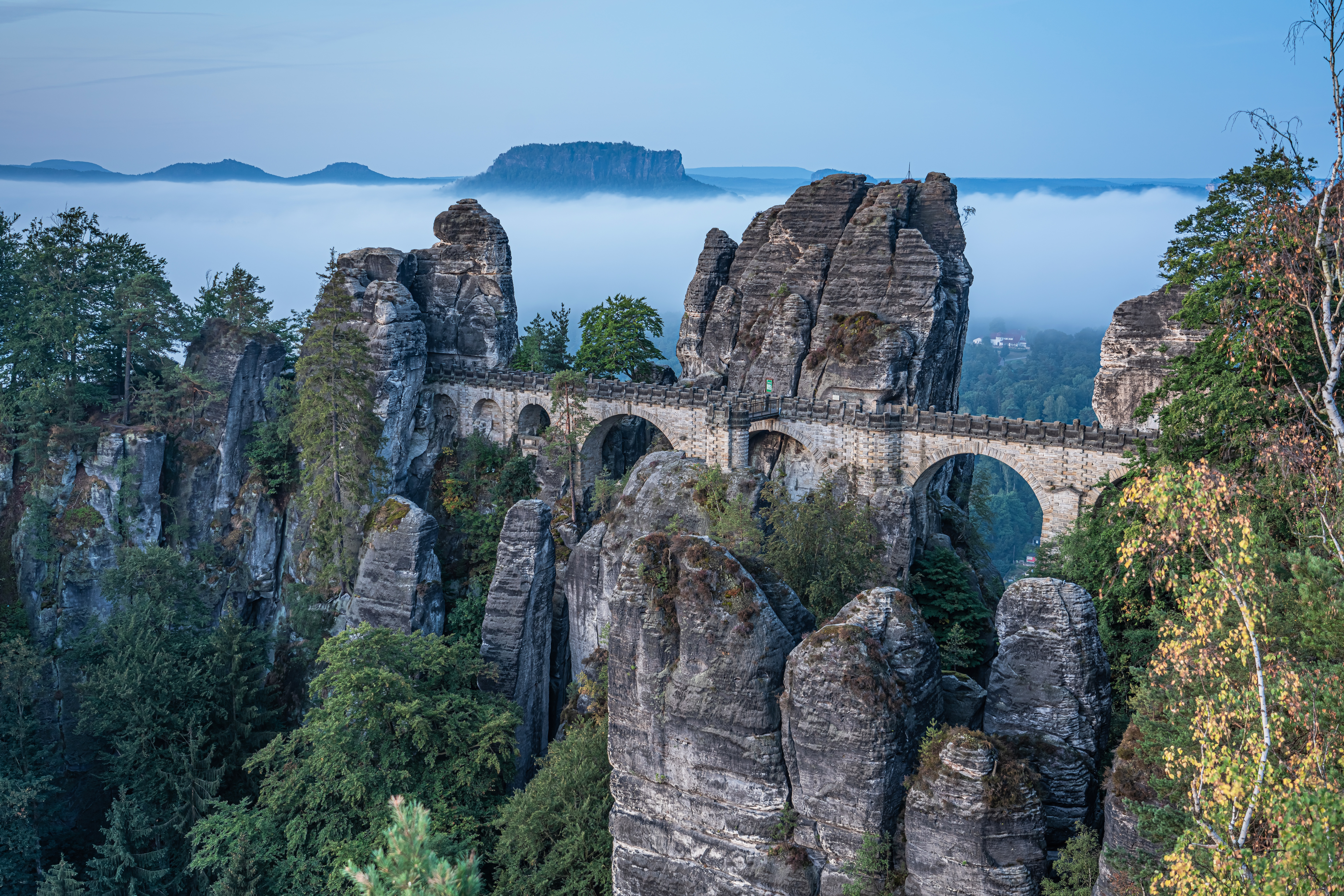
The Bastei Bridge

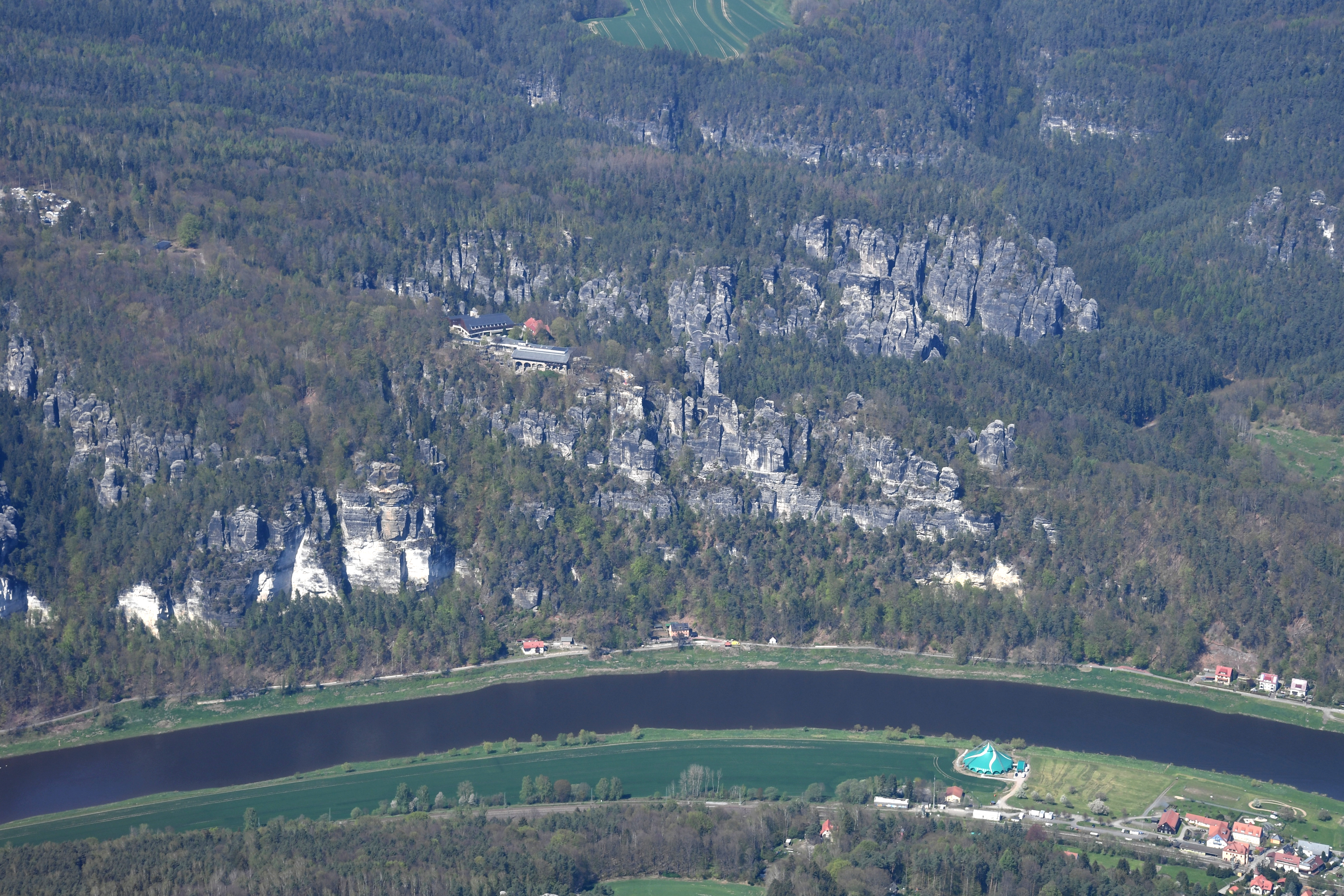
Aerial image of the Bastei rock formation

The Bastei is a rock formation rising 194 metres (636 ft) above the Elbe River in the Elbe Sandstone Mountains of Germany. Reaching a height of 305 metres (1,001 ft) above sea level, the jagged rocks of the Bastei were formed by water erosion over one million years ago. They are situated near Rathen, not far from Pirna southeast of the city of Dresden, and are the major landmark of the Saxon Switzerland National Park. They are also part of a climbing and hiking area that extends over the borders into the Bohemian Switzerland (Czech Republic).

The Bastei has been a tourist attraction for over 200 years. In 1824, a wooden bridge was constructed to link several rocks for the visitors. This bridge was replaced in 1851 by the present Bastei Bridge made of sandstone. The rock formations and vistas have inspired numerous artists, among them Caspar David Friedrich (German: Felsenschlucht, lit. 'Rocky Gorge').

The spa town of Rathen is the main base for visiting the Bastei; the town can be reached from Dresden by paddle steamer on the river Elbe.

== History ==
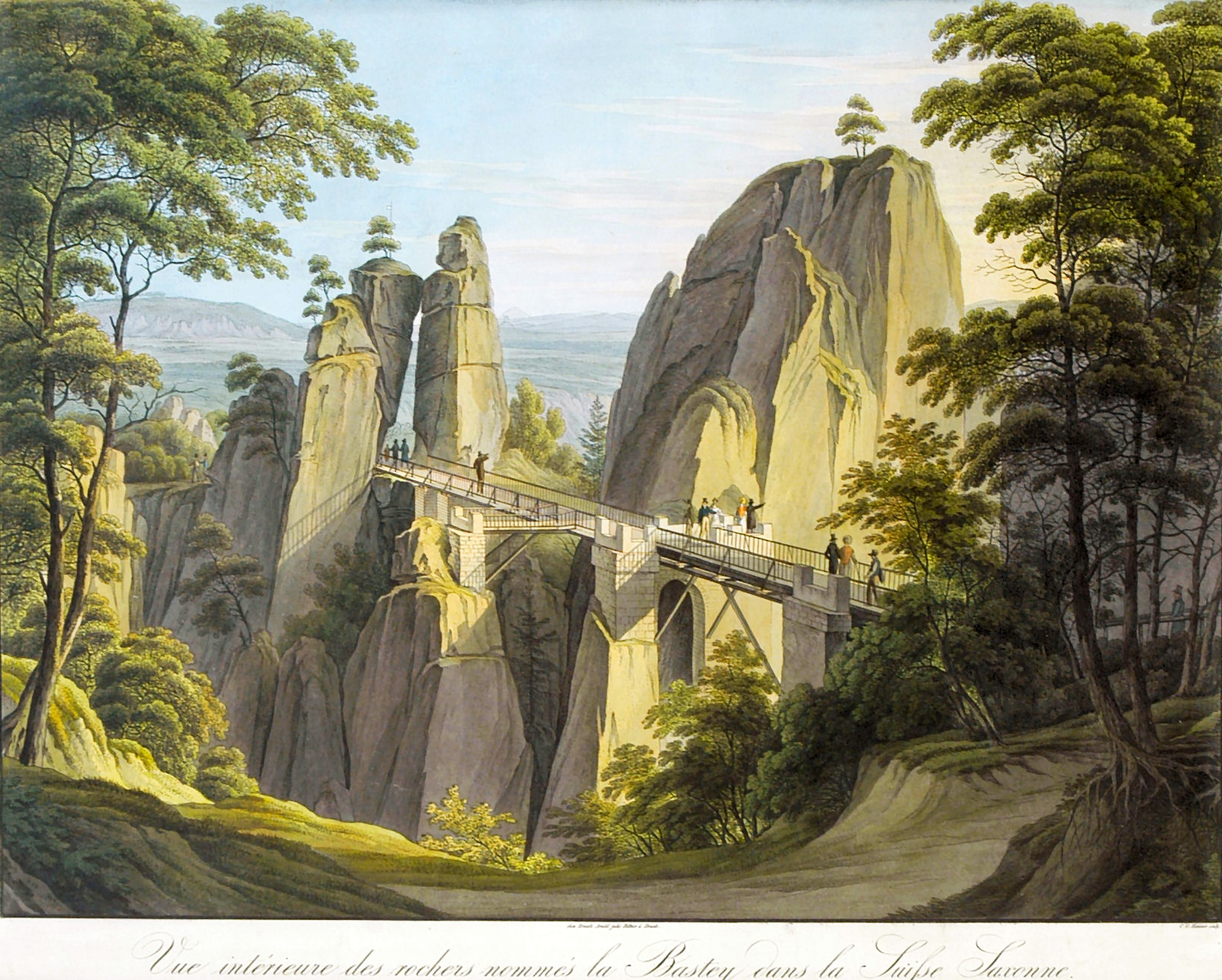
The wooden Bastei bridge (1826)

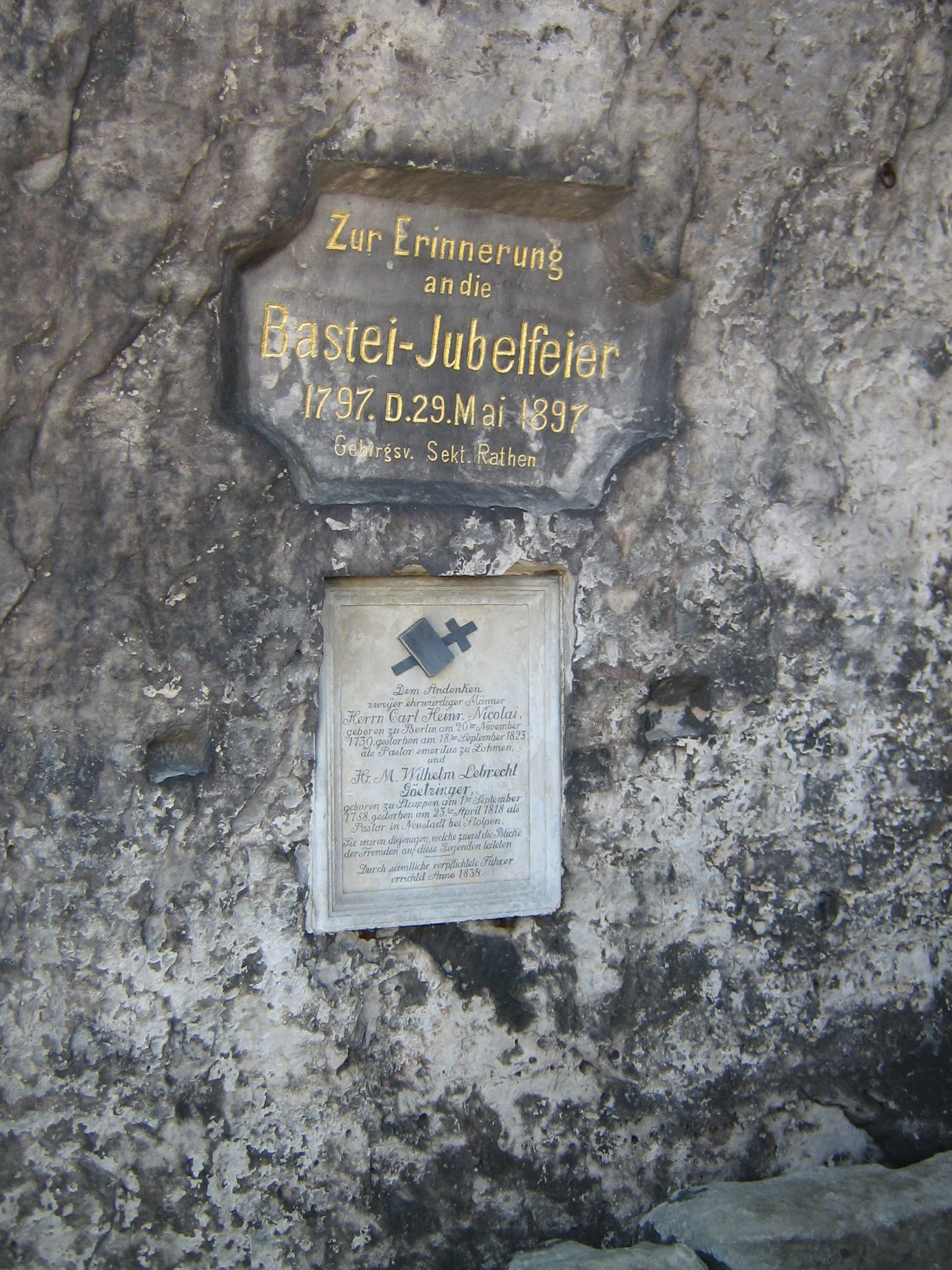
Memorial tablet on a rock by the Bastei bridge

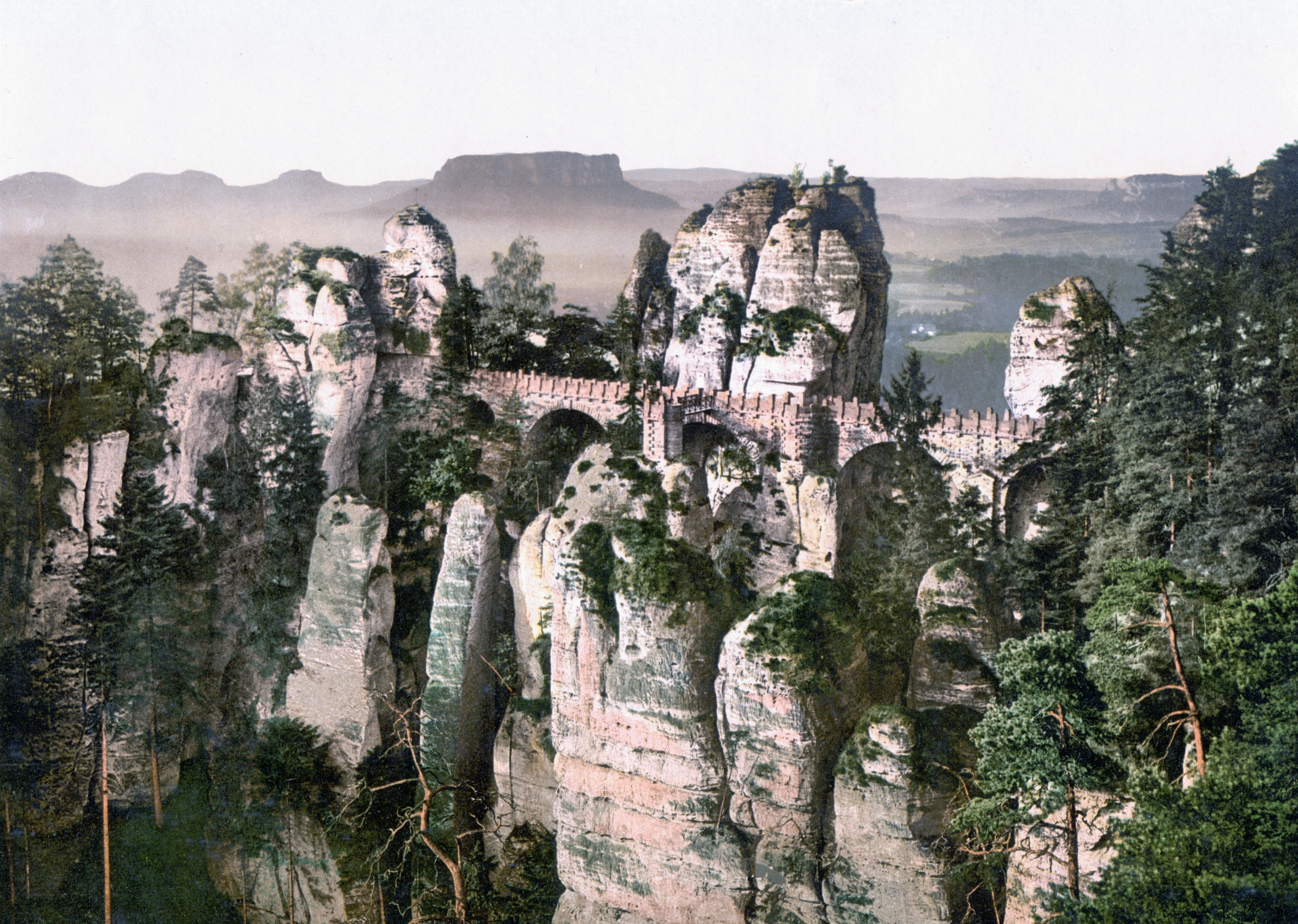
The Bastei around 1900

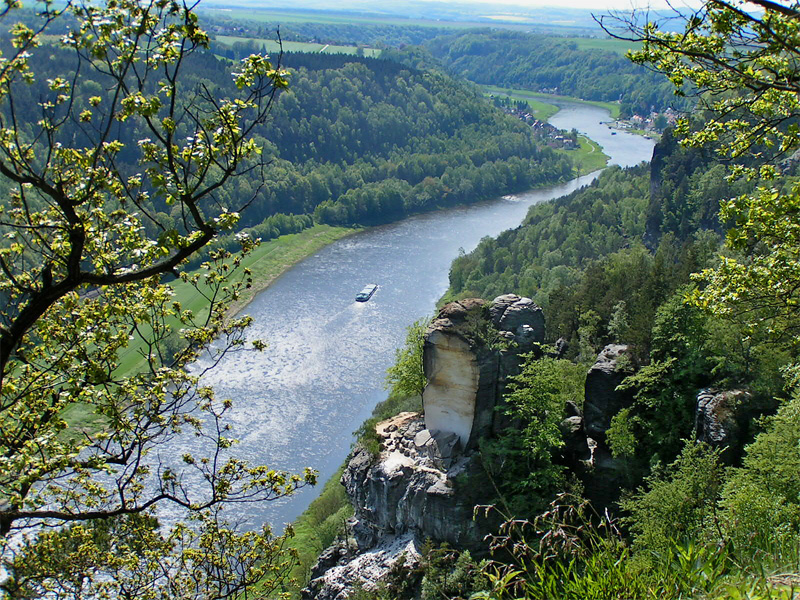
View of the Elbe and the Wartturm rocks

The name Bastei ("bastion") refers to the inclusion of steep, towering rocks in the old defensive ring around Neurathen Castle. The rocks were first mentioned as Pastey in 1592 by Matthias Oeder during the first state survey by the Electorate of Saxony. As the region of Saxon Switzerland was explored and developed for tourism, the Bastei became one of its first tourist attractions. The lookout point was first referred to in travel literature in 1798 in a publication by Christian August Gottlob Eberhard. One of the first walking guides who took visitors to the Bastei was Carl Heinrich Nicolai, who wrote in 1801: "What depth of feeling it pours into the soul! You can stand here for a long time without being finished with it (…) it is so difficult to tear yourself away from this spot."

The Bastei was only readily accessible from Wehlen and Lohmen with numerous artists reaching the Bastei over the so-called Painter's Path, the Malerweg. Caspar David Friedrich painted his famous picture Felsenpartie im Elbsandsteingebirge ("Rocks in the Elbe Sandstone Mountains") based on the Bastei. Ludwig Richter also sketched the Bastei. From Rathen, access was more difficult; but in 1814 a staircase with 487 steps was built that climbed out of the Wehlgrund valley past the Vogeltelle to the rocks.

At Pentecost in 1812, the Lohmen butcher, Pietzsch, started the first catering services for visitors to the Bastei. From two simple huts he sold bread, butter, beer, brandy, coffee, and milk. Two years later a kitchen and a cellar were built below one of the rock overhangs and the lookout point was fitted with a railing. In February 1816, Pietzsch was given a license to sell spirits; the modest huts he had built were destroyed in a fire in September of the same year. In June 1819, August von Goethe reported: "Friendly huts and good service with coffee, double beer, spirits and fresh bread and butter really revived the tired wanderer ...". In 1820, the spirit license was granted to the Rathen judge (Erblehnrichter), Schedlich.

The development of the Bastei was given a significant boost in 1826. That year the first inn building with overnight accommodations was built based on plans by Gottlob Friedrich Thormeyer. From that point on, the old huts acted as night quarters for the walking guides. The first bridge, called Bastei Bridge (Basteibrücke), was built of wood over the deep clefts of the Mardertelle, linking the outer rock shelf of the Bastei with the Steinschleuder and Neurathener Felsentor rocks. In 1851, due to the steady increase in visitors, the wooden bridge was replaced by a sandstone bridge, which is still standing today. It is 76.5 m long and its seven arches span a ravine 40 m deep.

By the end of the 19th century, the Bastei had become the main attraction of Saxon Switzerland. The inn was completely converted and extended in 1893/94. A high-pressure water main was run to the building in 1895 and a telephone line followed in 1897. Around 1900, plans were made for the construction of a mountain railway from the Elbe Valley to the Bastei, but the railway was never built. Even today a ravine southwest of the Bastei is known as the Eisenbahngründel ("Little Railway Valley"). At the beginning of the 20th century, the Bastei road was widened to handle the growing automobile traffic.

After 1945 the number of visitors increased sharply again, especially on weekends and public holidays, as the Bastei became a popular tourist destination. Between 1975 and 1979 the former inn was replaced by a large new building, later a hotel.

== Tourism ==
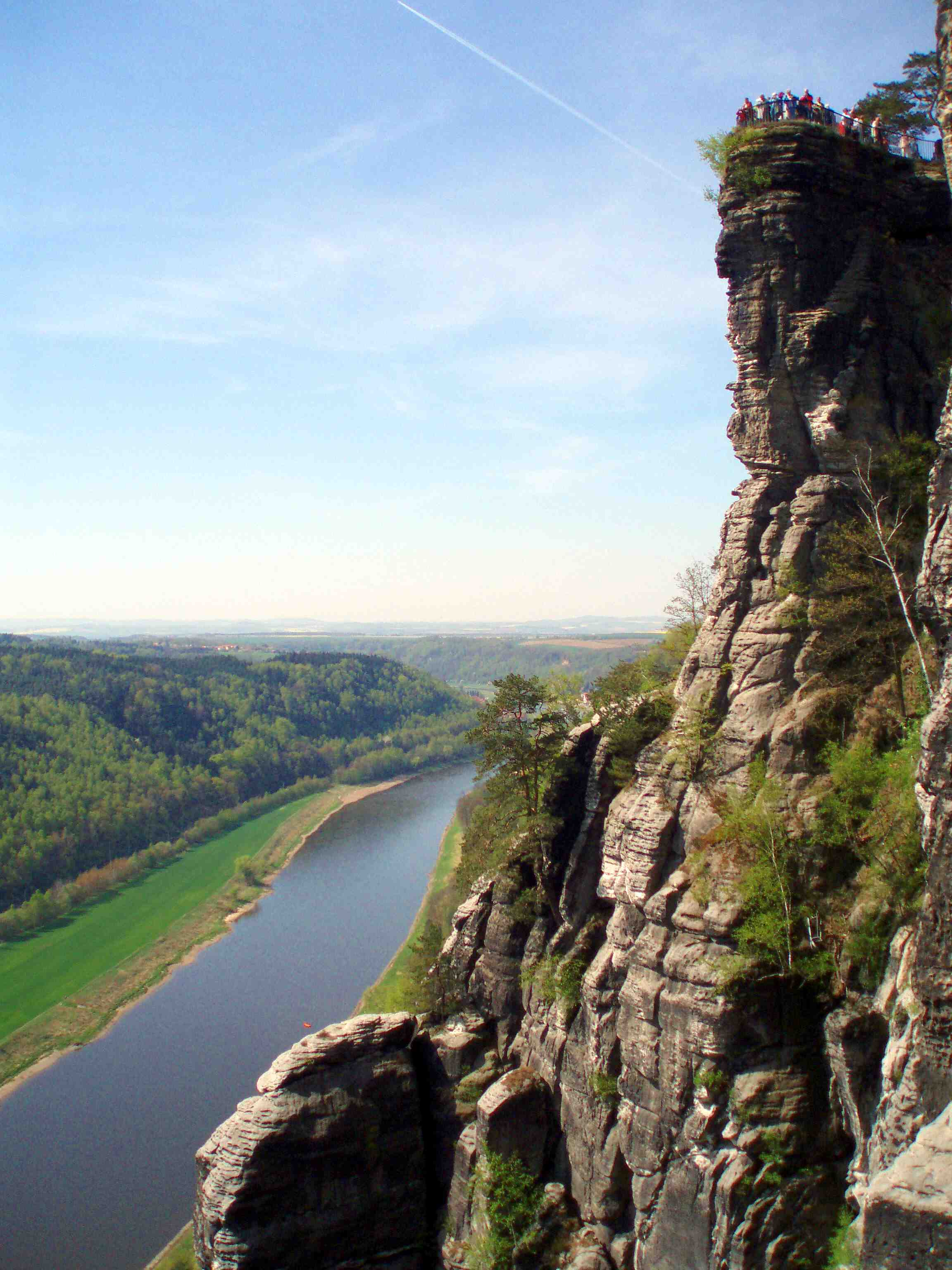
View of the Bastei

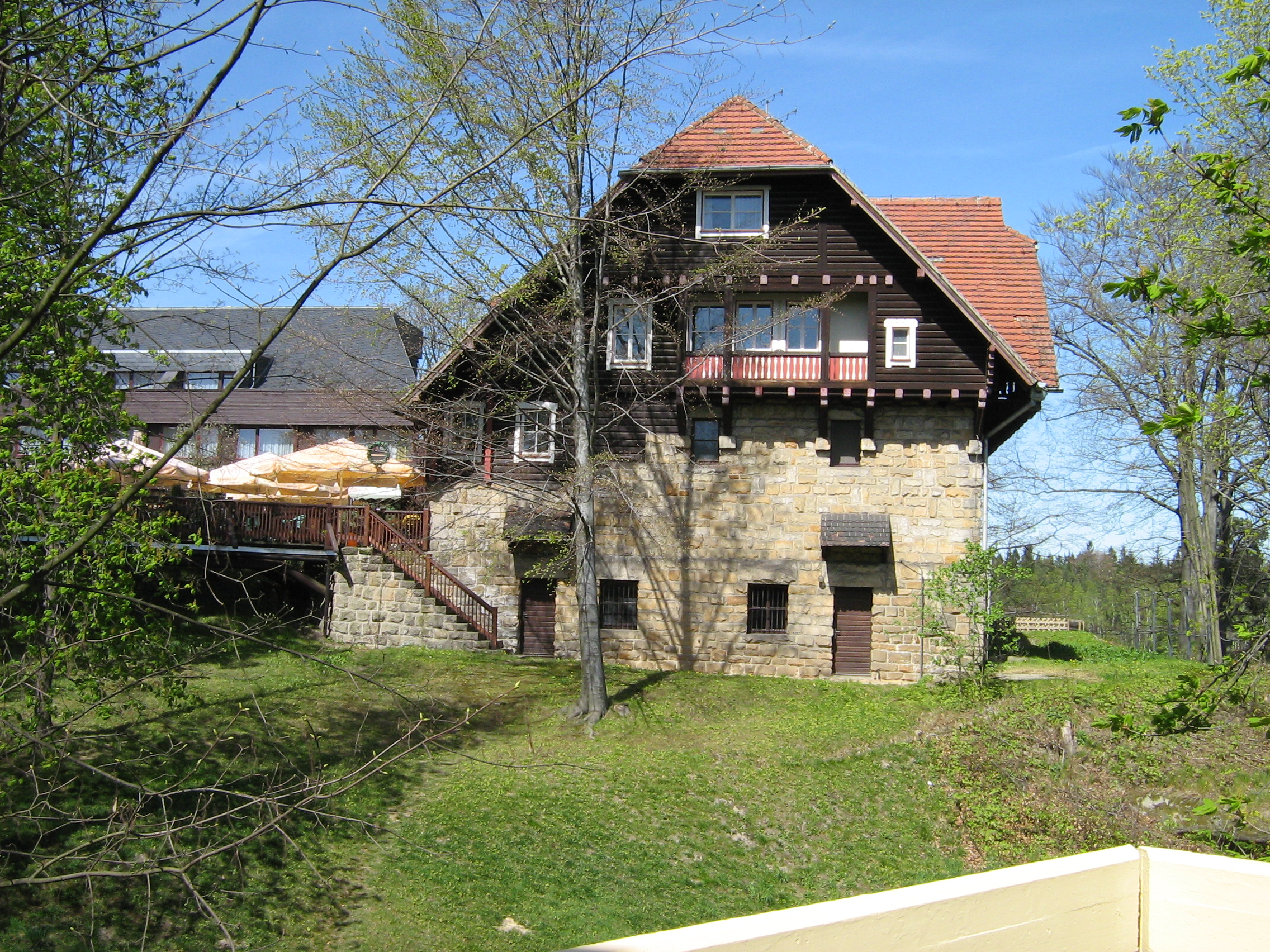
The Schweizerhaus of the Bastei Hotel on the Bastei

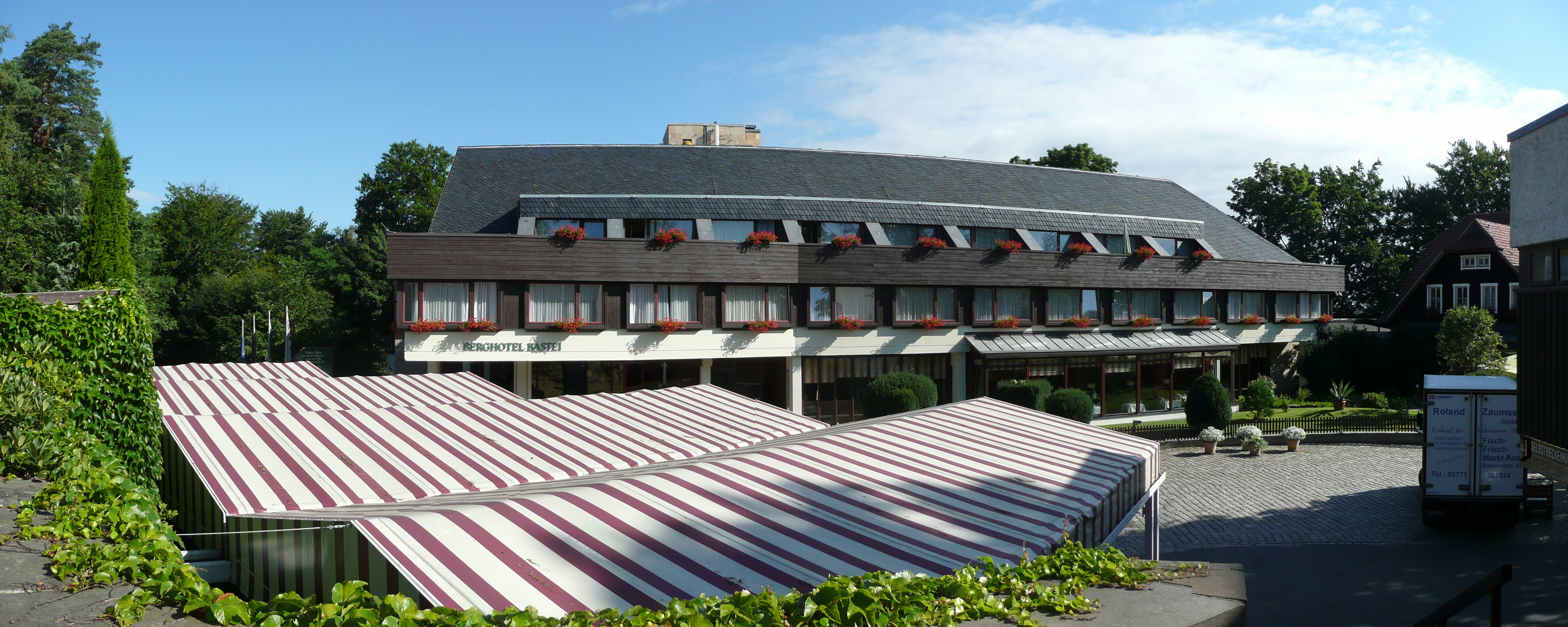
The mountain hotel

The Bastei is one of the most prominent lookout points in Saxon Switzerland. In 1819 August von Goethe extolled the views: "Here, from where you see right down to the Elbe from the most rugged rocks, where a short distance away the crags of the Lilienstein, Königstein and Pffafenstein stand scenically together and the eye takes in a sweeping view that can never be described in words." Today the Bastei still has the highest number of visitors of all the lookout points in Saxon Switzerland.

In addition to the actual vista, there are also other points of interest. At the Jahrhundertturm, a rock pinnacle on the Bastei Bridge, there are tablets commemorating the first mention of the Bastei in travel literature (in 1797) as well as the memory of Wilhelm Lebrecht Götzinger and Carl Heinrich Nicolai. These last two were amongst the pioneers of tourism in Saxon Switzerland, thanks to their descriptions of their journeys and their other works. Another tablet commemorates the Saxon court photographer, Hermann Krone, who took the first landscape photographs in Germany at the Bastei Bridge in 1853. From the Ferdinandstein, part of the Wehltürme rock towers, there is a famous view of the Bastei Bridge. It is reached over a branch from the route to the bridge. Another well-known rock formation in the vicinity of the Bastei is the Wartturm, a large piece of which broke off in 2000.

Neurathen Castle, the largest rock castle in Saxon Switzerland, may be reached from the Bastei by crossing the Bastei Bridge. The ruins of the castle, some timber rebates, rooms carved out of the rock, a cistern and stone shot from a medieval catapult or slingshot may be viewed on a self-conducted circular walk. A replica slingshot was put on display in the castle in 1986. The finds from excavations in the area, especially pottery, can also be seen. The climb from Rathen to the Bastei runs past an open-air museum dedicated to Slavic settlement in the region and also past the path leading to the Rathen Open Air Stage.

Another famous landmark in the local area is the fortress of Königstein.

The Eisenach–Budapest mountain path runs over the Bastei.

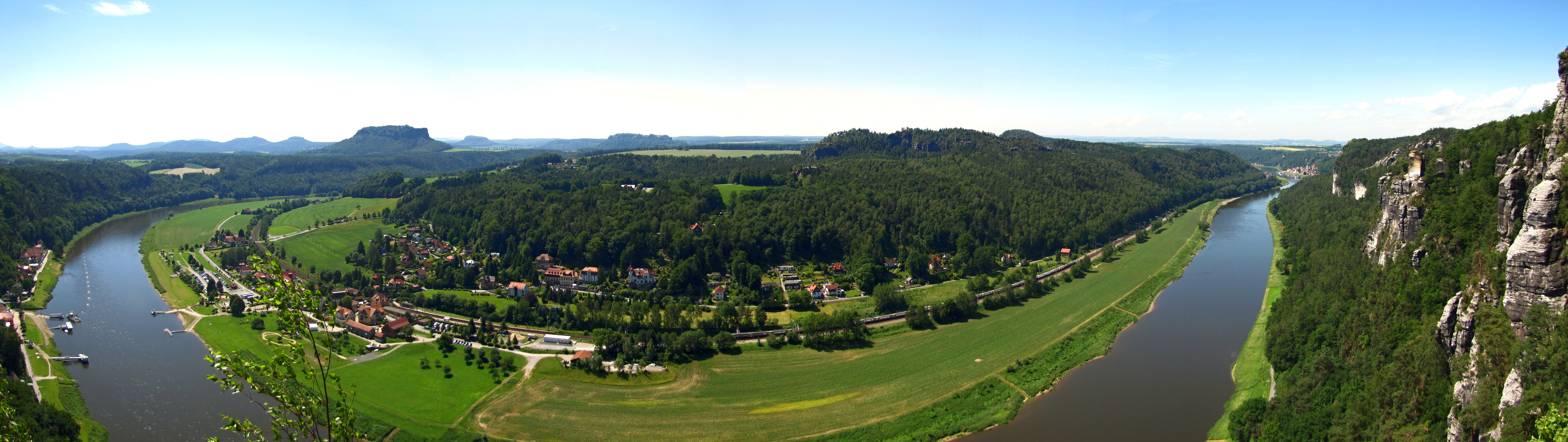
Panoramic view from the Bastei over the Elbe valley

== Nature conservation ==
As early as the turn of the 20th century, nature conservationists were pressing for the protection of the rock landscape around the Bastei. Plans for the construction of a mountain railway were thus prevented. In 1938 the Bastei became the first nature reserve in the Elbe Sandstone Mountains. Today it is part of the core zone of the Saxon Switzerland National Park, in which especially strict conservation rules apply.

== See also ==
- Belogradchik Rocks

== Sources ==
- Alfred Meiche: Historisch-Topographische Beschreibung der Amtshauptmannschaft Pirna. Verlag Buchdruckerei von Baensch-Stiftung, Dresden 1927
- Richard Vogel, Dieter Beeger: Gebiet Königstein – Sächsische Schweiz. Reihe Werte unserer Heimat Bd. 1, Akademie-Verlag, Berlin 1985
