= Amselgrund =

Valley in eastern Germany

Coordinates: 50°58′9″N 14°4′45″E

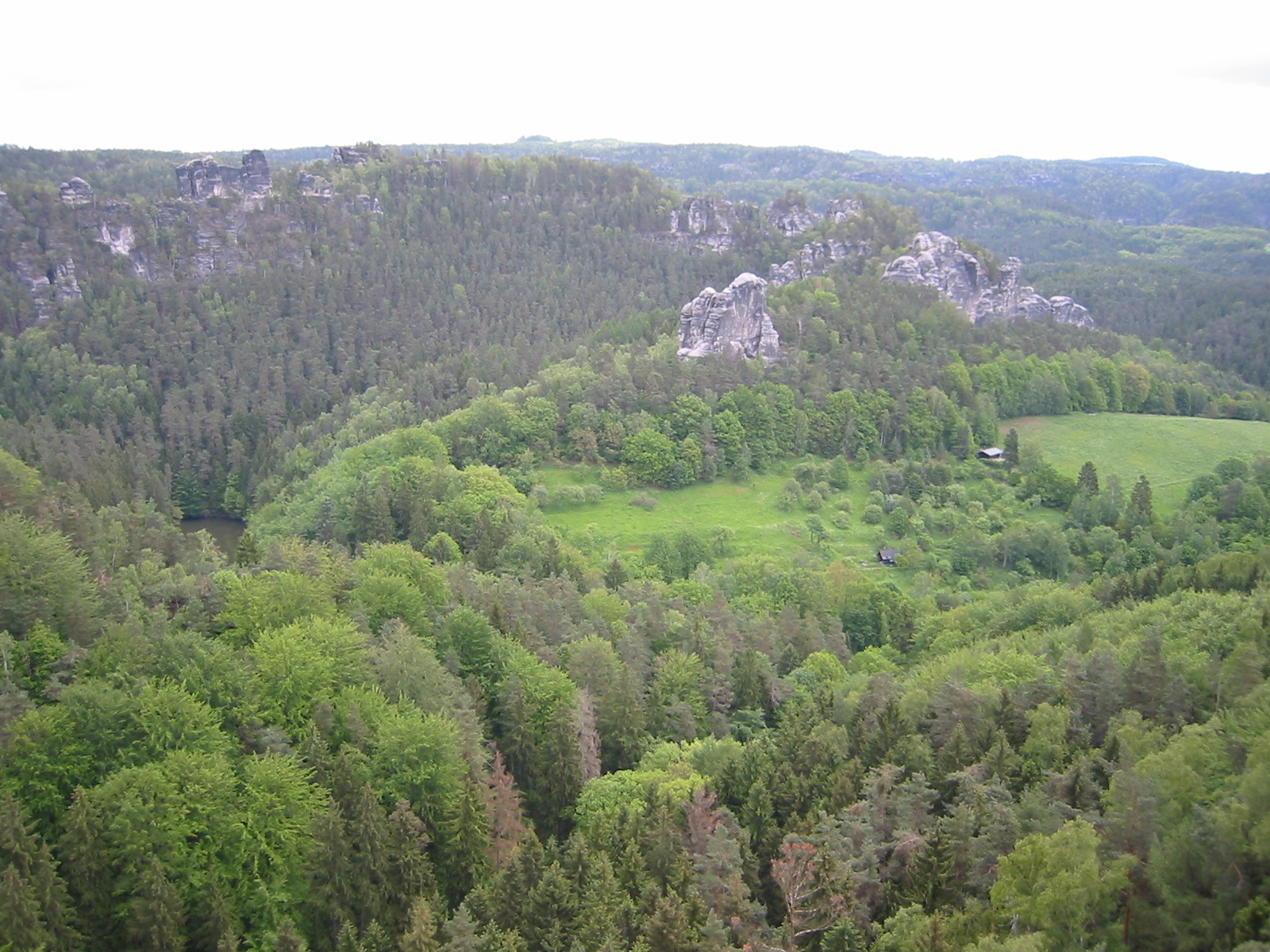
The Amselgrund with the Amselsee, Lokomotive and the Talwächter

The Amselgrund ("Blackbird Ground") is the name given to the valley of the Grünbach stream in the heart of Saxon Switzerland in eastern Germany. It runs from Niederrathen upstream to Rathewalde. The valley takes hikers through the Rathen rock basin with its bizarre rock formations. Its touristic high points are the lake of Amselsee and the Amsel Falls, that trickles over the grotto called the Amselloch. The valley bottom that is densely wooded is surrounded by a backdrop of rocks. To the west tower the rocks of the Gansfelsen, to the south the Feldsteine and the Türkenkopf, and to the east rise the Honigsteine rocks with the striking Lokomotive. The middle of the valley bottom is dominated by the striking Talwächter.

Whilst the character of the valley profile in its upper reaches is rather ravine-like, between its entrance to the Schwedenlöcher and Niederrathen it is a steep valley. On the stream bed ripple marks may be seen. Above the Amsel Falls, large, fallen sandstone boulders block the watercourse, so that the rather lower water quantities of the Grünbach have to find their way past them.
