= List of mountains and hills of the Elbe Sandstone Mountains =

This list of mountains and hills in the Elbe Sandstone Mountains contains a selection of the highest mountains, hills and crags in the Elbe Sandstone Mountains that straddle the German-Czech border.

The key to abbreviations in the table is given below.

Mountain, hill, crag (German name)	Height m above sea level)	Area (Location in the NP or PLA)	Location (municipality)	Notes	File
Děčínský Sněžník	723.5	Labské pískovce PLA	Jílové	highest mountain in the Elbe Sandstone Mountains; observation tower and mountain inn	Děčínský Sněžník seen from Děčín
Nad Stěnami	622.8	Labské pískovce PLA	Jílové		Nad Stěnami (right)
Růžovský vrch	619.1	Bohemian Switzerland NP	Růžová	highest mountain in Bohemian Switzerland NP; used to have an observation tower	Růžovský vrch seen from the Noldenberg
Großer Zschirnstein	560.3	Saxon Switzerland	Kleingießhübel	highest elevation in German part of the Elbe Sandstone Mountains; viewing point	Zschirnsteine: Großer Zschirnstein (right), Kleiner Zschirnstein (left)
Großer Winterberg	556.0	Saxon Switzerland NP	Schmilka	highest elevation in Saxon Switzerland NP; observation tower and hilltop hotel	Großer Winterberg with Schrammsteine in front, seen from Bad Schandau
Holý vrch	528.1	Labské pískovce PLA	Jílové		
Kleiner Winterberg	499.9	Saxon Switzerland NP	Schmilka	with Winterbergpavillon hunting lodge and Wappenstein; viewing point	Kleiner Winterberg and Winterstein seen from the Teichstein
Großes Horn	495.8	Saxon Switzerland	Bad Gottleuba		
Okrouhlík	494	Labské pískovce PLA	Děčín		
Jedlina	490	Bohemian Switzerland NP	Jetřichovice		
Sokolí vrch (Limberk)	486.6	Bohemian Switzerland NP	Doubice		
Bor	486.5	Bohemian Switzerland NP	Jetřichovice		
Rudolfův kámen	484	Bohemian Switzerland NP	Jetřichovice	viewing point	Rudolfův kámen
Suchý vrch	481	Bohemian Switzerland NP	Jetřichovice		
Auerhahnsteig	480.3	Saxon Switzerland NP	Schmilka		
Hřebec	477.8	Bohemian Switzerland NP	Doubice		
Mlýny	475.3	Bohemian Switzerland NP	Jetřichovice		
Kleiner Zschirnstein	472.7	Saxon Switzerland	Kleingießhübel	viewing point	Zschirnsteine: Kleiner Zschirnstein (left), Großer Zschirnstein (right)
Oltářní kámen	469.5	Bohemian Switzerland NP	Hřensko		
Strážiště	469.2	Labské pískovce PLA	Janská		
Mrchoviště	466.8	Labské pískovce PLA	Děčín		
Smrkový kopec	463	Bohemian Switzerland NP	Hřensko		
Studený roh	461	Bohemian Switzerland NP	Hřensko		
Raumberg	459.3	Saxon Switzerland NP	Hinterhermsdorf	Ruins of a survey tower	
Stříbrné stěny	459.2	Bohemian Switzerland NP	Hřensko		
Bouřňák	457.3	Bohemian Switzerland NP	Hřensko		
Křídelní stěna	455.5	Bohemian Switzerland NP	Hřensko		
Hrad	453	Bohemian Switzerland NP	Doubice		
Koliště	452.7	Bohemian Switzerland NP	Jetřichovice		
Papststein	451.2	Saxon Switzerland	Gohrisch	Hilltop inn and fire brigade watchtower; viewing point	Papststein
Koliště	449.5	Bohemian Switzerland NP	Jetřichovice		
Gohrisch	447.8	Saxon Switzerland	Gohrisch	viewing point	Gohrisch seen from Papststein
Vilemínina stěna	439	Bohemian Switzerland NP	Jetřichovice	viewing point	View from the Wilhelminenwand
Děčínský les	438	Labské pískovce PLA	Děčín		
Pfaffenstein	434.6	Saxon Switzerland	Königstein	observation tower and hilltop inn (incl. part of the Museum for Mineralogy and Geology, Dresden)	Pfaffenstein
Mariina skála	428	Bohemian Switzerland NP	Jetřichovice	observation and refuge hut	refuge hut on the Marienfels
Vilemínina skála	422	Bohemian Switzerland NP	Jetřichovice		
Kleines Pohlshorn	417.2	Saxon Switzerland NP	Hinterhermsdorf		
Hoher Torstein	425.0	Saxon Switzerland NP	Bad Schandau	viewing point	The Schrammsteine seen from Reinhardtsdorf
Lilienstein	415.2	Saxon Switzerland NP	Prossen	Hilltop inn and Wettin obelisk	Lilienstein at dusk
Waitzdorfer Höhe	413.7	Saxon Switzerland NP	Waitzdorf		
Teichstein	412.5	Saxon Switzerland NP	Ottendorf		
Křížový vrch	407.6	Bohemian Switzerland NP	Jetřichovice		
Pastevní vrch (Hutberk)	402.2	Labské pískovce PLA	Růžová		

== Key ==
The abbreviations used in the table (in alphabetical order) are:

- NP = National Park – Saxon Switzerland National Park and Bohemian Switzerland National Park (Národní park České Švýcarsko)
- PLA = Protected landscape area Labské pískovce

== See also ==
- List of mountains in the Czech Republic
- List of mountains in Saxony
- List of the highest mountains of Germany
- List of the highest mountains in the German states
