= Šaunštejn Castle =

- Vysoká Lípa
- Schauenstein rock castle

Site information
- Code: CZ
- Condition: ruin

Location
- Location within Czech Republic
- Coordinates: 50°52′10.01″N 14°21′12.32″E

Site history
- Built: 14th century

Šaunštejn Castle (German: Schauenstein, also Hohenleipaer Raubschloss) is a rock castle near Vysoká Lípa (Hohenleipa) in the Bohemian Switzerland in the Czech Republic. Today only a few ruins remain of the original castle. Preserved are the foundations of the wooden superstructure, several rooms that were chiselled-out of the rock and the cistern.

== History ==
The castle was built by the Berka of Dubá family from Lípa in the 14th century to protect the Old Bohemian Road (Alte Böhmerstraße), the trade route from Bohemia to Lusatia. From 1435 it belonged to the Wartenbergs who used it as a base for raids. In the 15th century it was besieged several times by the Wettins and the Lusatian League and finally destroyed.

== Views ==
In clear weather the view extends from the Kaltenberg, the Lausche, the Rosenberg, over the Hoher Schneeberg to the Ore Mountains.

== See also ==
- List of castles in the Czech Republic

== Sources ==
- Richard Klos: Die sechs Felsenburgen in der Böhmischen Schweiz. In: Sächsische Heimatblätter Heft 3/1968, pp. 97–103
