= Rock Chapel =

Rock Chapel may refer to:

- Chapel on the Rock, a popular tourist landmark in Allenspark, Colorado, United States
- Chapel Rock, New Zealand
- Farmington Rock Chapel, built between 1861 and 1863 in the town of Farmington, Utah, United States
- Rock chapel (Všemily), a rock chapel in the Czech Republic
- Little Rock Chapel Falls, a high horsetail ribbon waterfall in Hamilton, Ontario, Canada
- William Miller Chapel and Ascension Rock, a historic district in New York, United States
- Rock-hewn Churches of Ivanovo
- Rock Chapel (Georgia), area around the Rock Chapel Mountain quarries in Lithonia, Georgia, United States

== See also ==
- Rockchapel, a village in north County Cork in Ireland
