= Barbara Schack =

Czechoslovak politician (1874–1958)

- Barbora Schacková
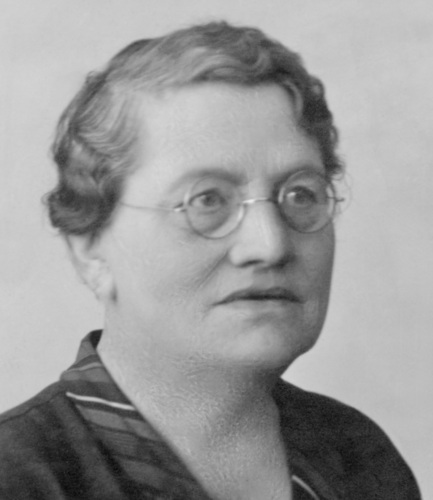
- Schack c. 1930s

Senator
- In office 26 May 1933 – 1935
- Preceded by: Anton Jarolim

Personal details
- Born: 20 September 1874 Cheb, Bohemia, Austria-Hungary
- Died: 27 October 1958 (aged 84) Moosburg an der Isar, Bavaria, West Germany
- Party: DSAP
- Spouse: Josef Engelbert Schack
- Children: 1

Barbara Schack (Czech: Barbora Schacková; 20 September 1874 – 27 October 1958) was a Sudeten German politician who served in the Senate of Czechoslovakia from 1933 until 1935. A member of the German Social Democratic Workers' Party, she led the women's wing of the party for the entire Interwar period.

== Biography ==
Barbara Schack was born on 20 September 1874 in Cheb in Bohemia, then part of Austria-Hungary. A Sudeten German, Schack's public career began in 1895 when she co-founded the Women's Workers' Education Association in Cheb and Kraslice. She later became a prominent member German Social Democratic Workers' Party (DSAP) in the far-western portion of Czechoslovakia. From 1918 until 1938, she chaired the party's women's wing, and at some point was a member of the Cheb town council.

In the 1929 Czechoslovak parliamentary election, Schack was elected to the Senate of Czechoslovakia as the substitute for Anton Jarolim. She was one of two female DSAP senators elected in the Interwar period, alongside Anna Perthen. Jarolim died in office and Schack was sworn-in to replace him on 26 May 1933. During her tenure, she gave two recorded speeches; occurring in 1933 and 1934, both speeches were about the Budget and Finance Acts for the following years. Schack left office at the end of her term in 1935.

Following the German annexation of the Sudetenland in 1938, Schack was arrested by the Nazi regime and imprisoned for five months. In 1946 – following the end of World War II – she was deported to Germany, settling in the town of Moosburg an der Isar in Bavaria. Schack died in Moosburg on 27 October 1958. Her husband was Josef Engelbert Schack, a shoe upper manufacturer who died in the 1950s. Their son Emil Schack was a musician who joined the Sturmabteilung in 1942, becoming the leader of a musician platoon.
