= Rock chapel (Všemily) =

Chapel in Všemily, Czech Republic

Coordinates: 50°50′19″N 14°22′26″E

Location map of Rock Chapel

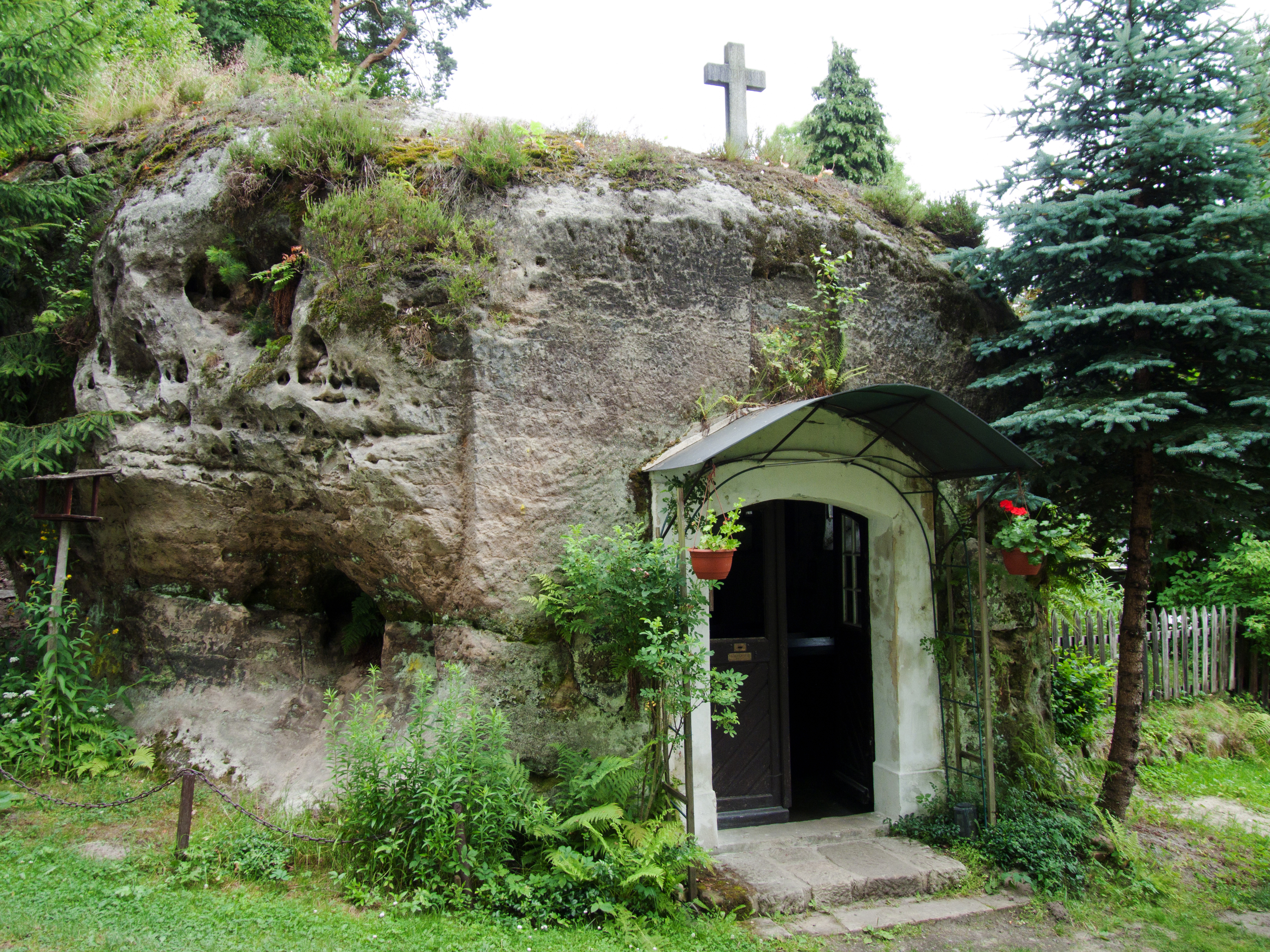
The Rock Chapel

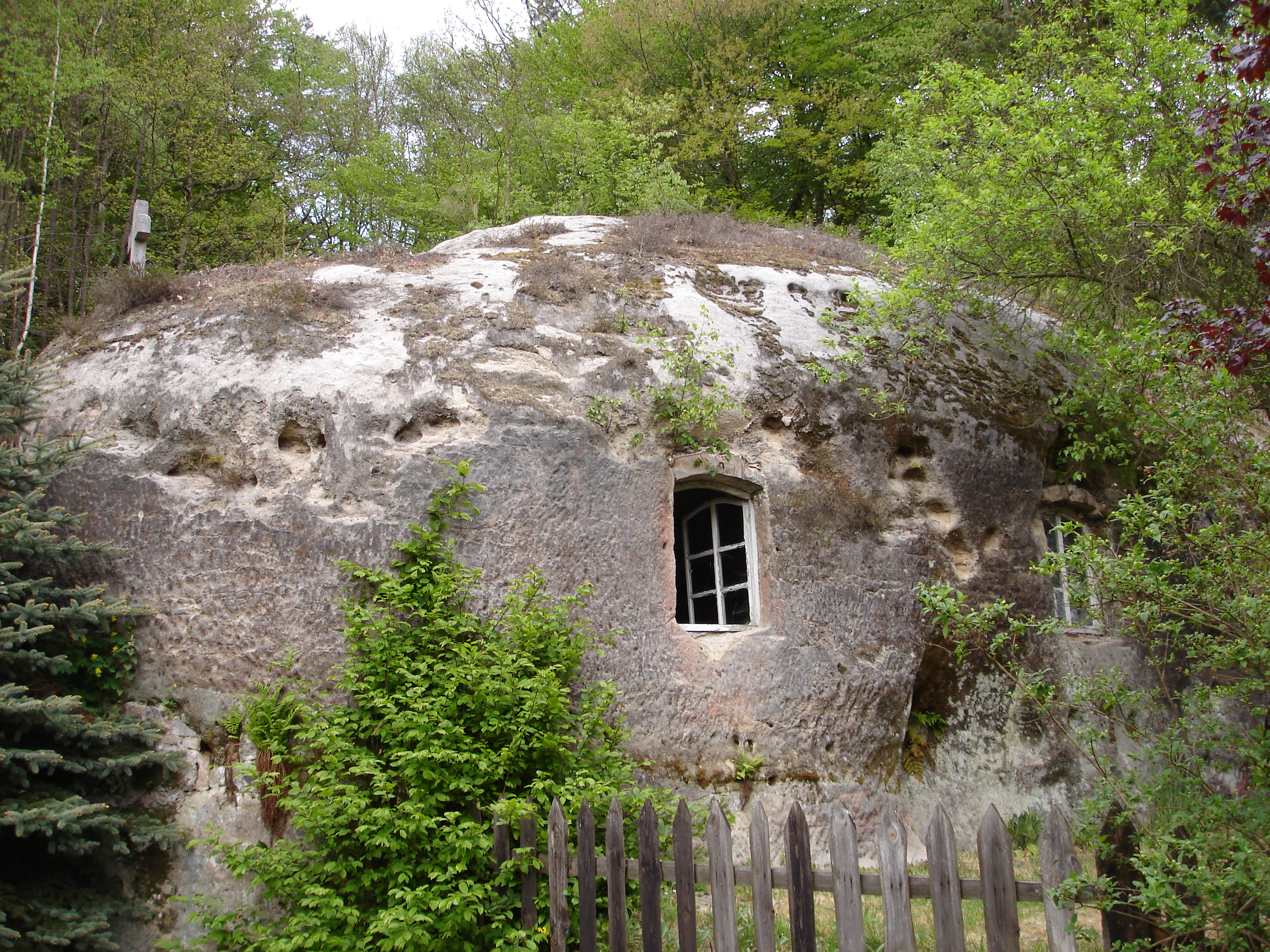
Side view

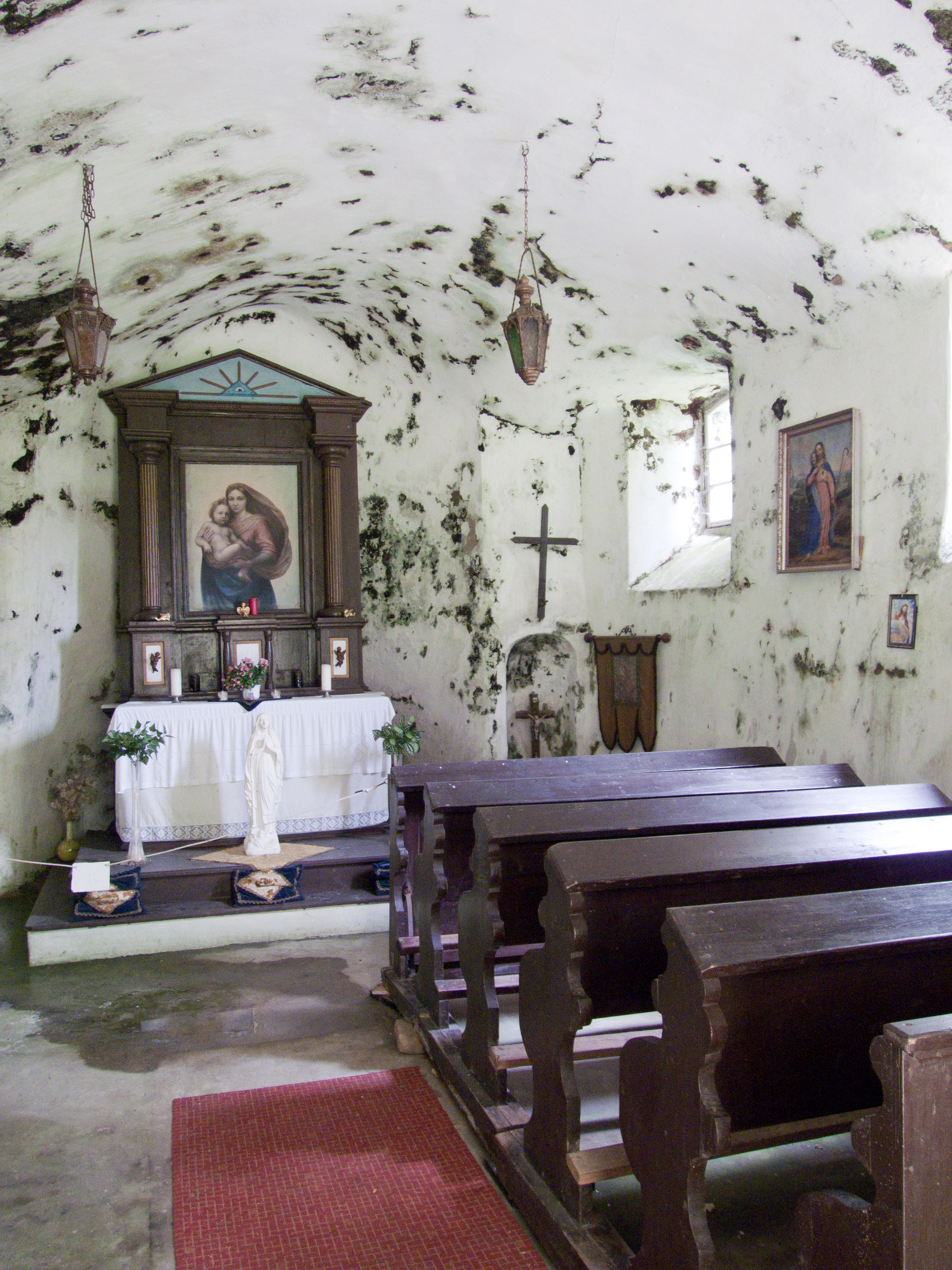
Interior view

The St Ignatius Rock Chapel (Czech: Kaple svatého Ignáce) is a chapel in Všemily (Schemmel) in the Czech Republic, which is entirely built into a hollowed-out block of rock. It is one of the most notable holy monuments in Bohemian Switzerland.

== Description ==
The unique chapel was hollowed entirely out of a free-standing block of sandstone that resembles a loaf of bread. From the outside only a small cross and the two windows are visible. Inside, only the moisture percolating through from above indicates that the chapel was hewn out of solid rock.

Together with the surrounding Upper Lusatian half-timbered houses the chapel forms a striking ensemble of the vernacular architecture of North Bohemia. Immediately in front are the old schoolhouse of Schemmel, which is striking on account of its size and the small bell tower on the roof.

== History ==
The chapel was first mentioned in directory of the crosses and statues of the diocese of Windisch Kamnitz in 1835:

A non public chapel, hewn out of the rock, inside a painting of Saint Ignatius. It stands on farming land. Its patron lives in Kaltenbach and no-one from the parish will take on the advowson, because it is made of stone, damp and everything in it is likely to decay soon.

Astonishingly, in spite of that, the chapel has survived to the present day. Even following the expulsion of the German folk after the Second World War, there were people amongst the new inhabitants of the village who looked after the chapel and protected it from threatened abandonment and destruction. Today the chapel is under the care of the municipal office of Jetřichovice (Dittersbach), to which the Všemily belongs today.

== See also ==
- Boží hrob
