= Falkenštejn Castle =

Coordinates: 50°51′17″N 14°24′20″E

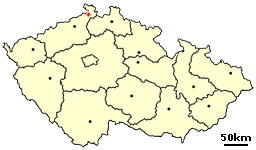
Location of Falkenštejn in the Czech Republic

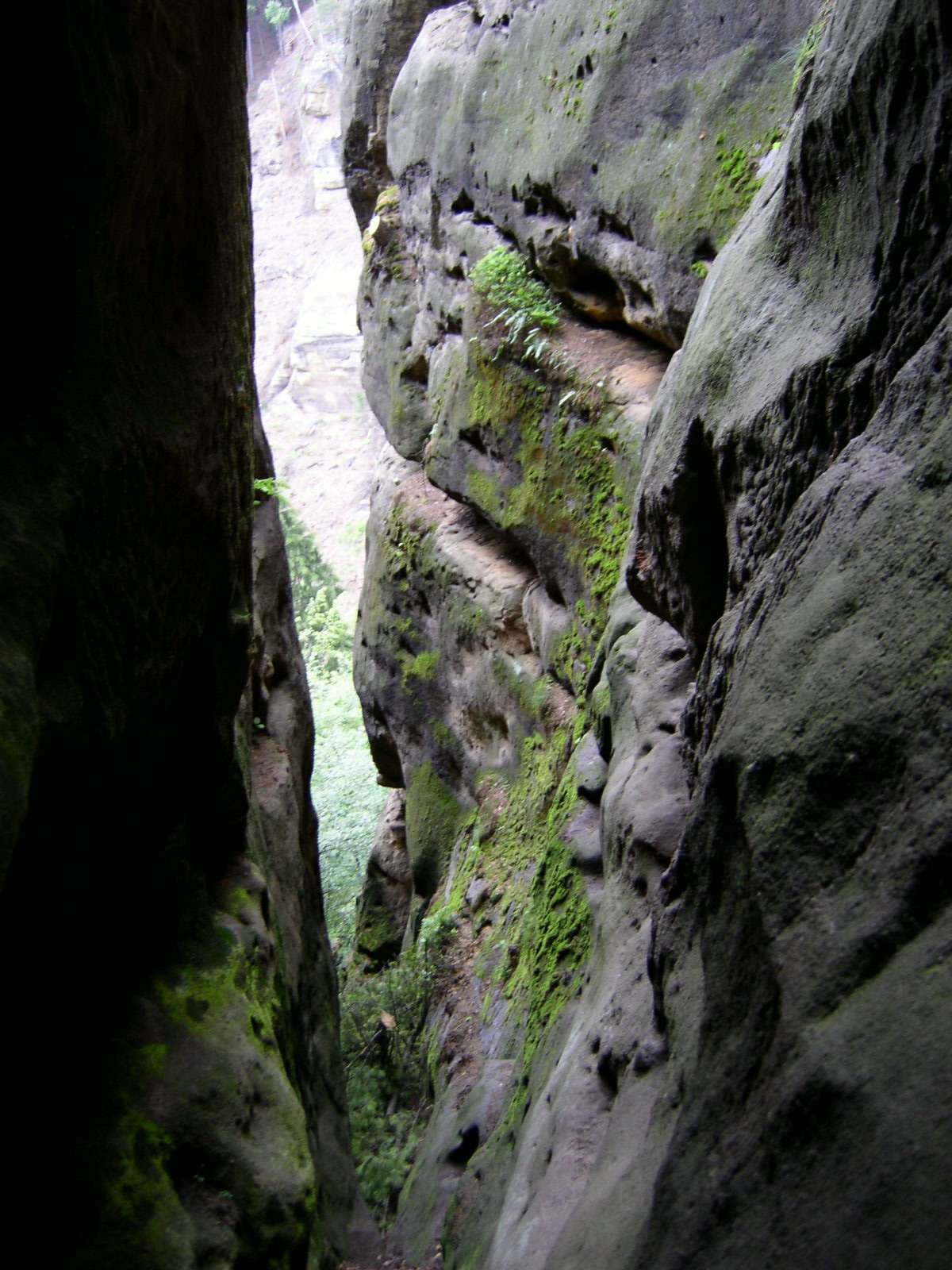
The path to Falkenštejn goes through this gap between the rocks

Ruins of Falkenštejn Castle (Falkenstein Castle, German: Felsenburg Falkenstein) can be found next to the village Jetřichovice in the Ústí nad Labem Region of the Czech Republic.

The castle was built probably during 13th century. First written mention from 1395 appears in the chronicle of nearby town Česká Kamenice. The castle had changed hands several times. No mention exists that it was ever conquered. Falkenštejn was abandoned during 15th century.

The small castle was located at the top of a sandstone rock very difficult to access, and a ladder was needed to climb into it. The buildings were made of wood. A well was not available, and instead a deep water tank was used.

In 1825 the place was cleared to make it accessible for the tourists. It is freely opened but it takes effort to get into the castle itself.
