= Bohemian Switzerland =

National park in the Czech Republic

Bohemian Switzerland National Park
- IUCN category II (national park)
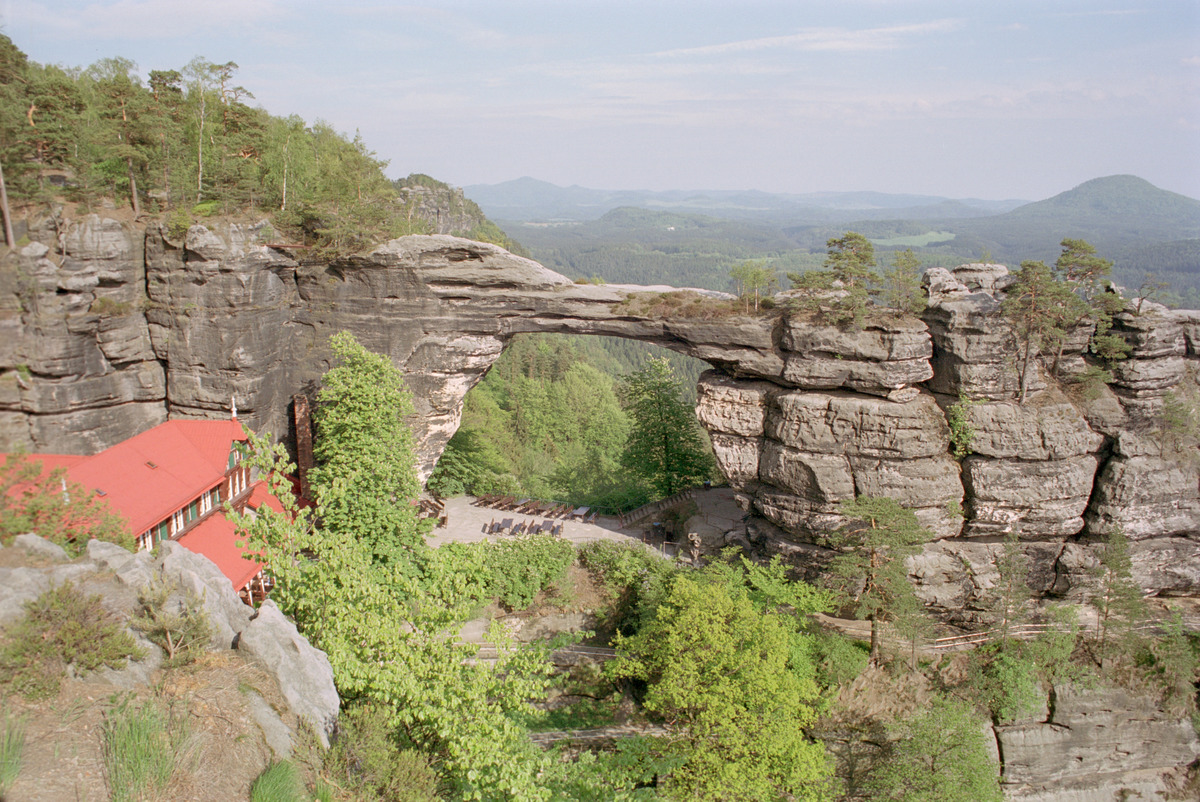
- The symbol of Bohemian Switzerland, Pravčická brána, the largest sandstone arch in Europe
- Interactive map of Bohemian Switzerland National Park
- Location: Czech Republic
- Coordinates: 50°50′N 14°15′E
- Area: 79 km^{2} (31 sq mi)
- Established: 2000
- Governing body: Správa ochrany přírody

Bohemian Switzerland (Czech: České Švýcarsko; German: Böhmische Schweiz), also known as Czech Switzerland, is a nature region in the Elbe Sandstone Mountains in the northwestern Czech Republic, protected as a national park.

It has been a protected area (as Elbe Sandstone Mountains Protected Landscape Area) since 1972. The region along the right side of the Elbe became a national park in 2000 and is adjacent to Saxon Switzerland National Park in Germany. Together with Saxon Switzerland, the region is known as Saxon-Bohemian Switzerland.

== Etymology ==
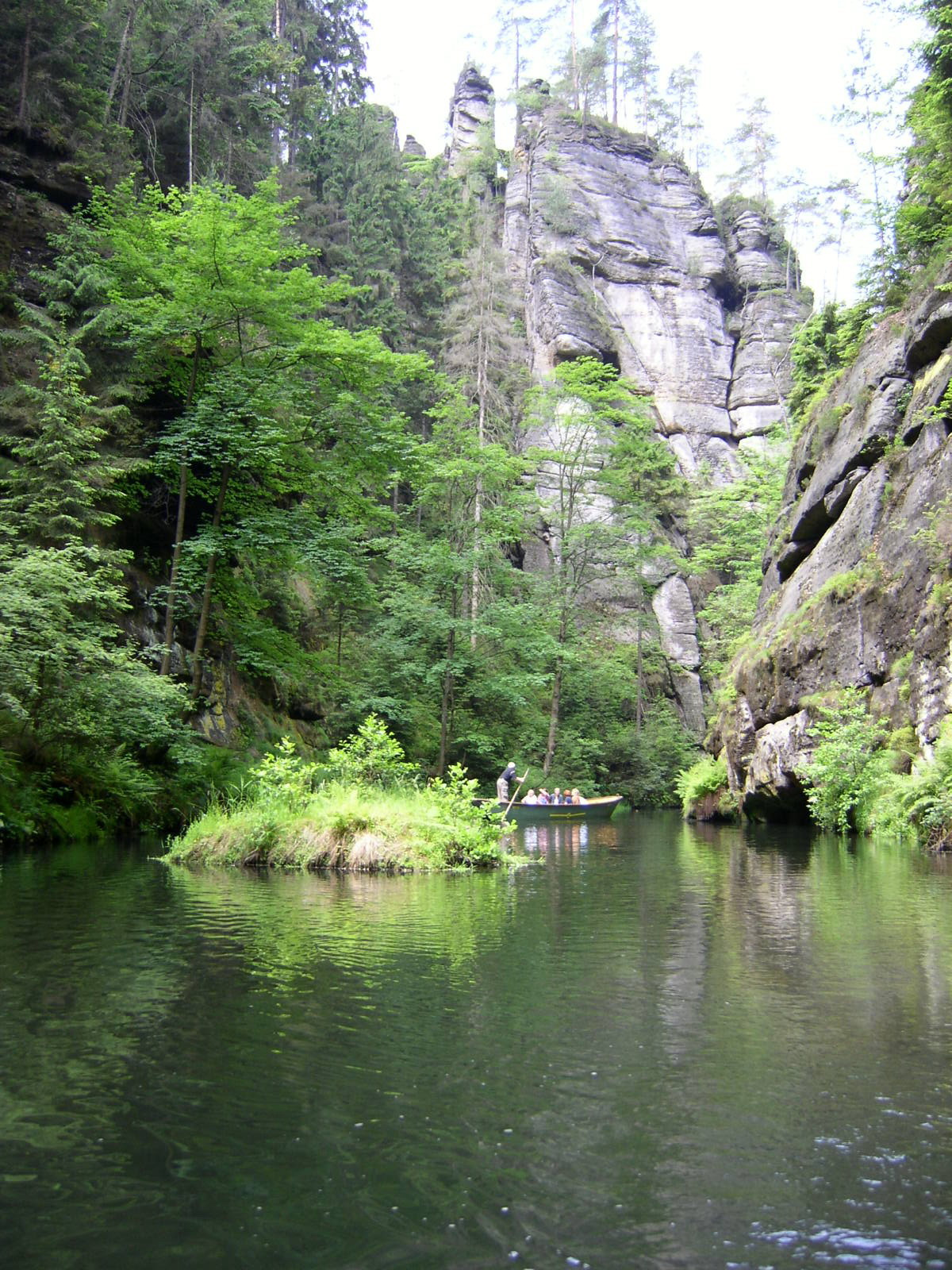
Core zone in the national park: Kamenice Gorge

The concept of Bohemian Switzerland developed in the 18th century as an extension of the Saxon Switzerland, a part of the Elbe Sandstone Mountains in Germany. The name was inspired by the Swiss artists Adrian Zingg and Anton Graff, who were reminded of their homeland by the geography of northern Bohemia.

== Geography ==
Bohemian Switzerland covers the eastern part of the Czech side of the Elbe Sandstone Mountains. It is located northeast of Děčín, on right bank of the Elbe River, which briefly forms its border. It extends eastward into the Lusatian Mountains and westward into the Ore Mountains. Its highest elevation is the hill Růžovský vrch at 619 m (2,031 ft) above sea level.

== History ==
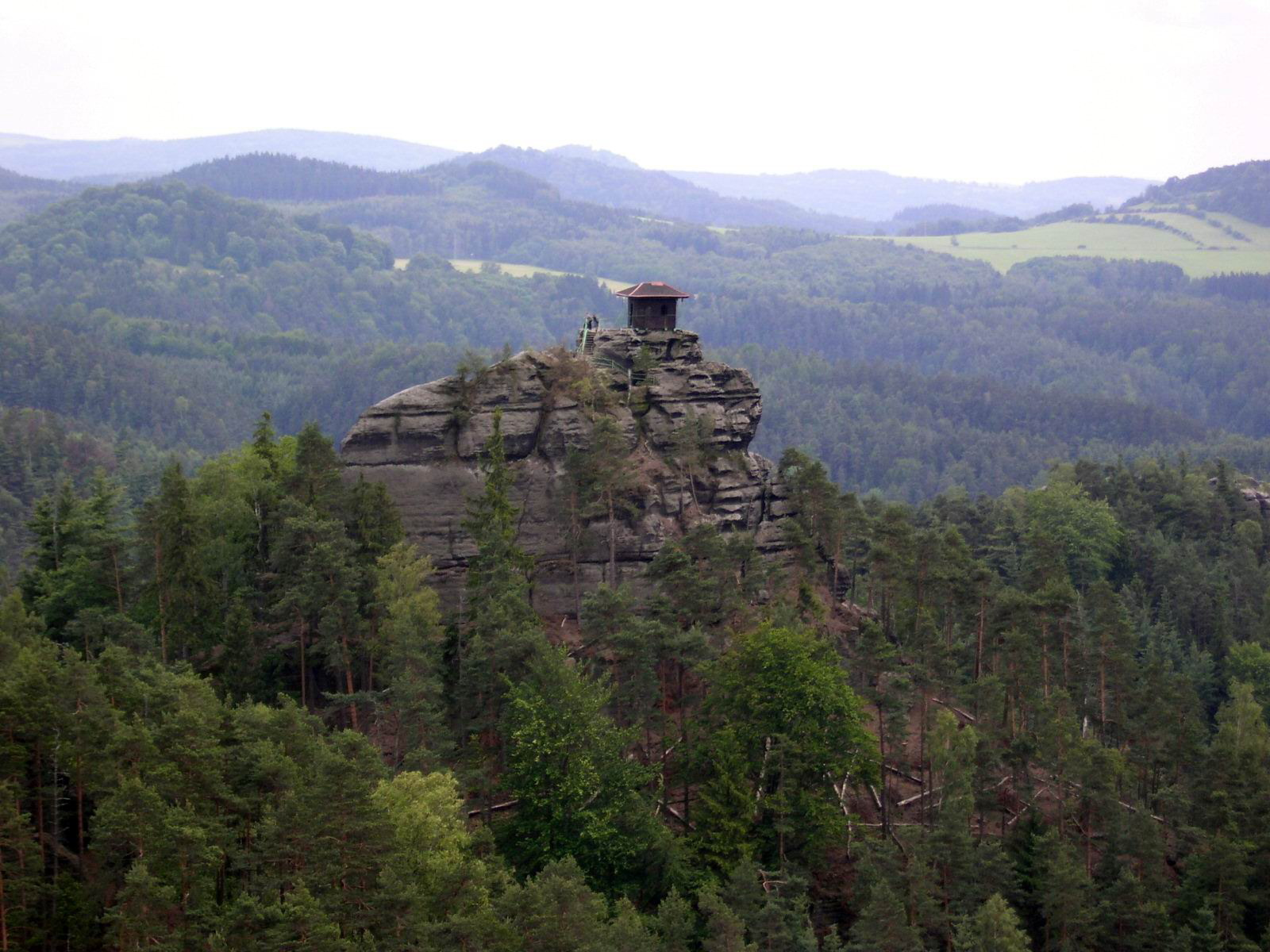
Mariina skála rock

A large number of castles were built in the Bohemian Switzerland region in order to guard the trade routes. Several of these castles were also used as medieval robber baron hideouts. The region had been very sparsely populated since ancient times by a few Germanic, Slavic and Celtic tribes, but was finally colonised in the 12th century by German-speaking settlers. Until the end of World War II it was home to German Bohemians (later known as the Sudeten Germans). Since its German population was driven out after 1945, the area has been almost exclusively settled by Czechs.

The area first began to draw tourists in large numbers in the second half of the 19th century. Artists of the Romantic era were inspired by the wild beauty of the rocks. For example, the artist Ludwig Richter or the composer Carl Maria von Weber, who set his famous opera Der Freischütz in the vicinity of Rathen.

== National park ==
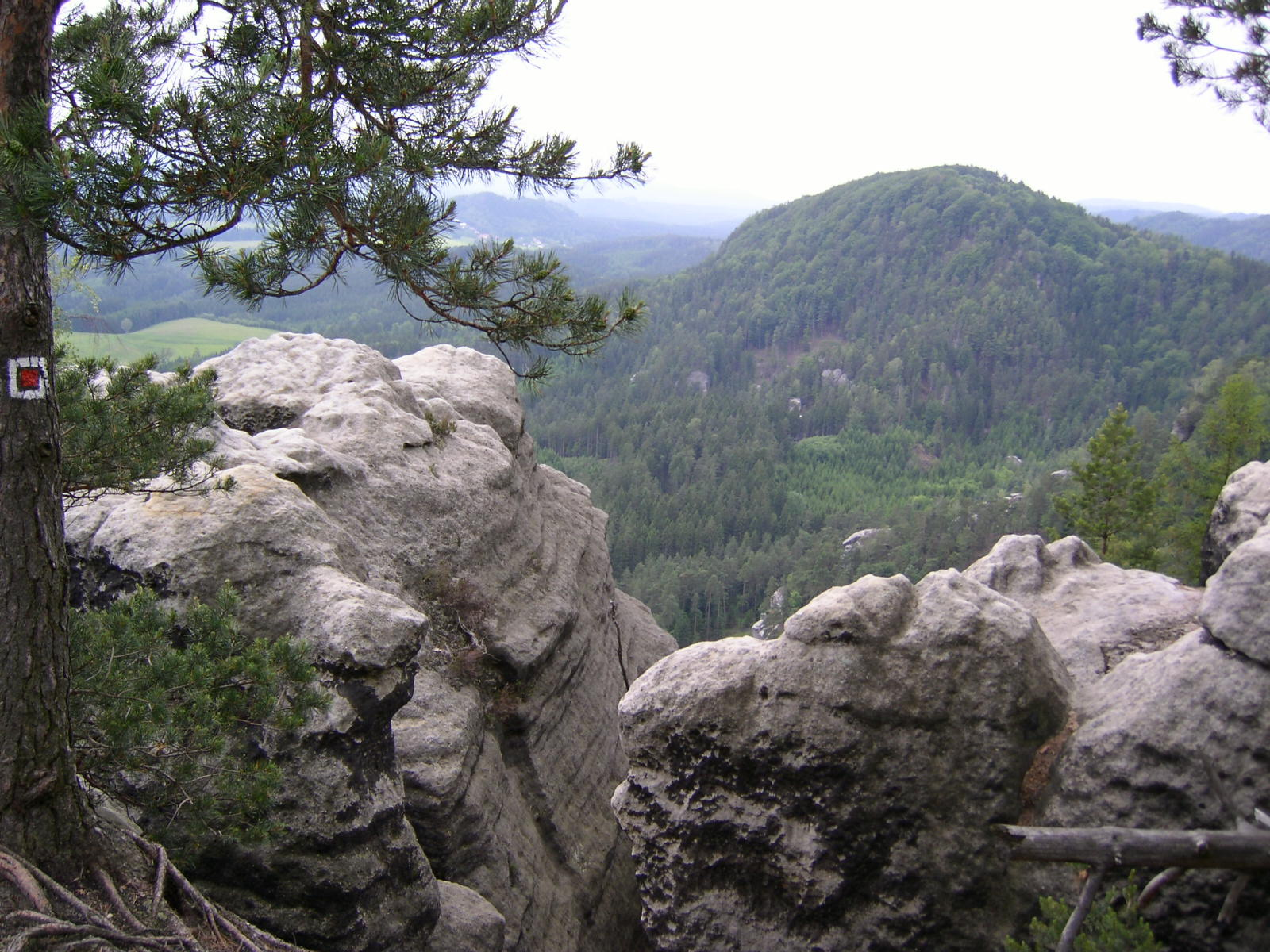
View from Vilemínina stěna

As early as 1972, the whole of Bohemian Switzerland was placed under protection. When, in 1990, the status of Saxon Switzerland was raised to that of a national park, efforts were stepped up to place the Bohemian part of Saxon-Bohemian Switzerland under national park protection as well. A plan devised in 1991 envisaged that this would also include the Růžovský vrch. This plan was heavily resisted by various groups, such as the owners of hunting land and the forestry industry. A compromise proposal also fell on stony ground. In 1999, the Czech government decided to create Bohemian Switzerland National Park to its originally envisaged extent. On 1 January 2000 the valuable forest and rock landscape, the Kamenice Gorge and the area around the Růžovský vrch were given national park status. The headquarters of the national park authority is located in Krásná Lípa, and there are information offices in Hřensko and Jetřichovice.

In July of 2022, a large scale manmade fire broke out affecting 10 square kilometres (1000 hectares) of the National Park. In April 2026 another fire occurred, this time on 100 hectares.

== Sights ==
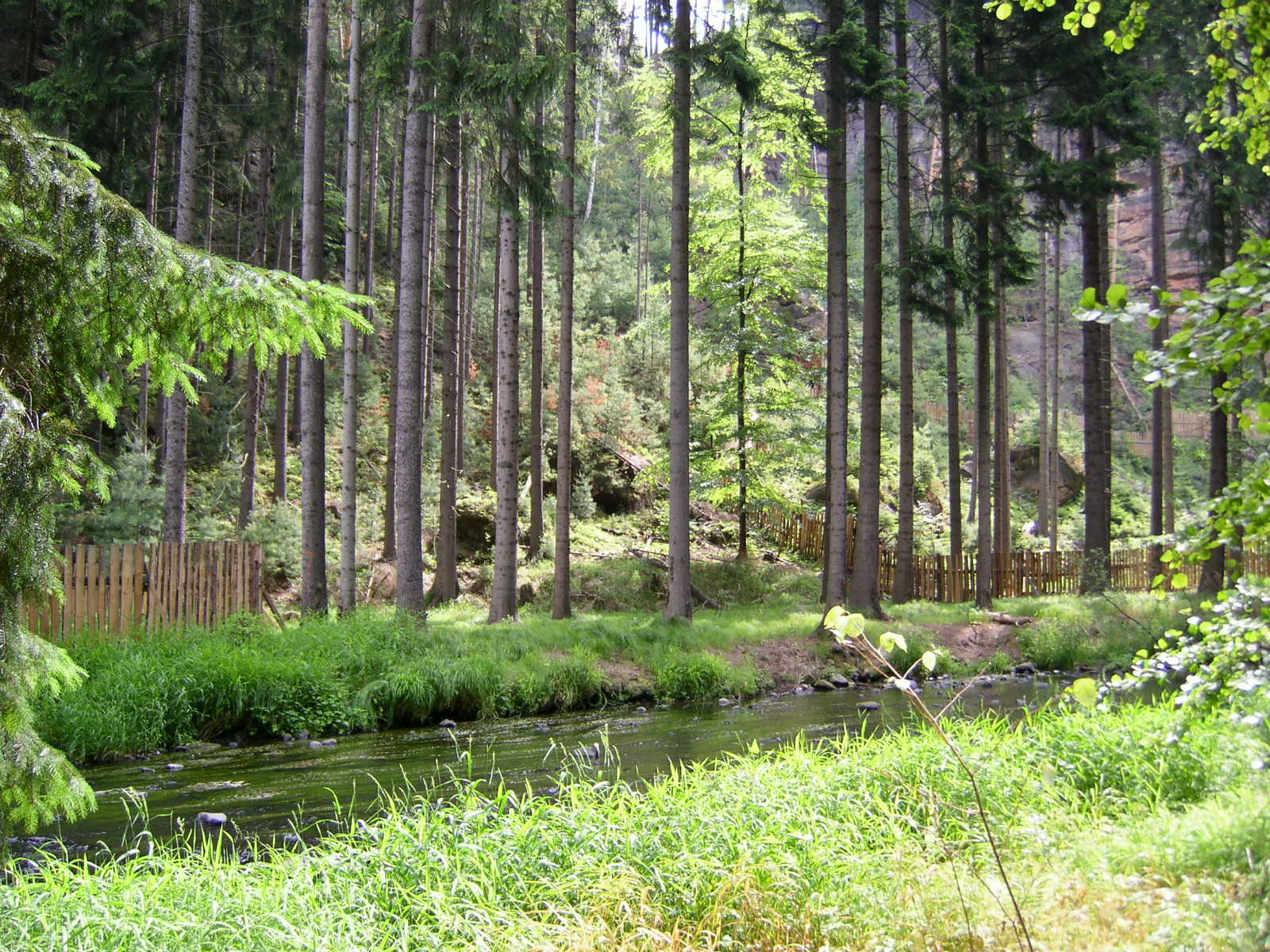
Pavlinino údolí

- Pravcicka Gate (Czech: Pravčická brána, German: Prebischtor), the largest natural sandstone arch in Europe
- Kamenice Gorge, a rock ravine near Hřensko
- Šaunštejn Castle, a robber baron rock castle near Vysoká Lipa
- Mariina skála, a viewing point near Jetřichovice
- Vilemínina stěna, a viewing point near Jetřichovice
- Rudolfův kámen, a viewing point near Jetřichovice
- Pavlinino údolí, the deeply incised, romantic valley of the Chřibská Kamenice stream
- Falkenštejn Castle, rock castle
- Rock chapel in Všemily
- Malá Pravčická brána, natural sandstone arch
- Na Tokáni, historic inn and hostel
- The well tended villages with their Upper Lusatian houses
