= Rudolfův kámen =

Mountain in the Czech Republic

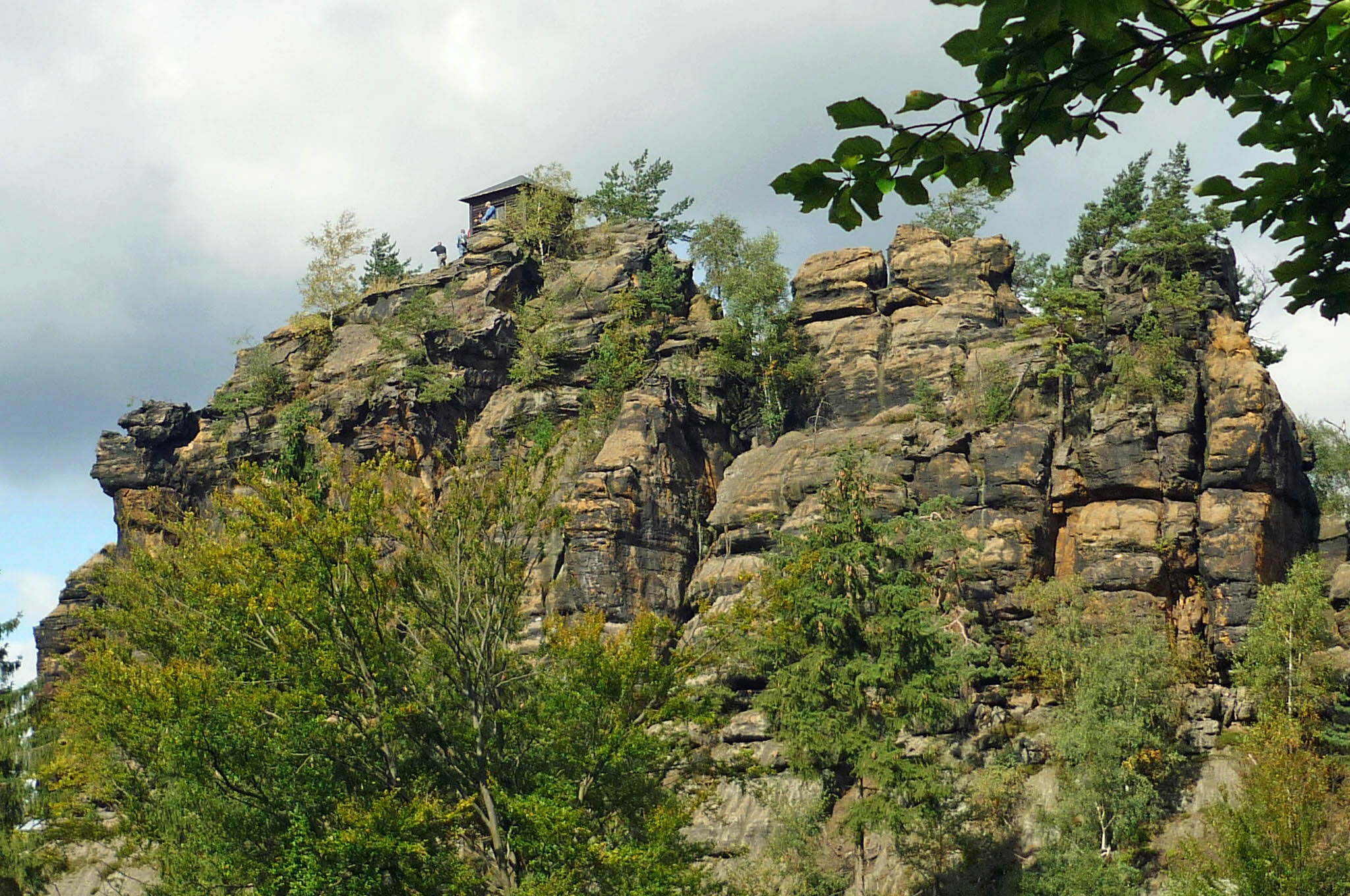
- View of Rudolfův kámen

Highest point
- Elevation: 484 m (1,588 ft)
- Coordinates: 50°52′12″N 14°24′12″E

Geography
- Location within Czech Republic
- Location: Jetřichovice, Czech Republic
- Parent range: Elbe Sandstone Mountains

Geology
- Mountain type: Sandstone

The Rudolfův kámen (also called Ostroh; German: Rudolfstein or Hoher Stein) is a rocky hill in the Elbe Sandstone Mountains in the Czech Republic, in the territory of Jetřichovice. It is located in the Bohemian Switzerland National Park and has an elevation of 484 m (1,588 ft) above sea level.

Rudolfův kámen is part of the Jetřichovice Rocks and belong to the most visited viewing points in the area. It was named in 1824 after Rudolf, 6th Prince Kinsky of Wchinitz and Tettau. A hut was built at the top.
