= Mariina skála =

Rocky hill in the Czech Republic

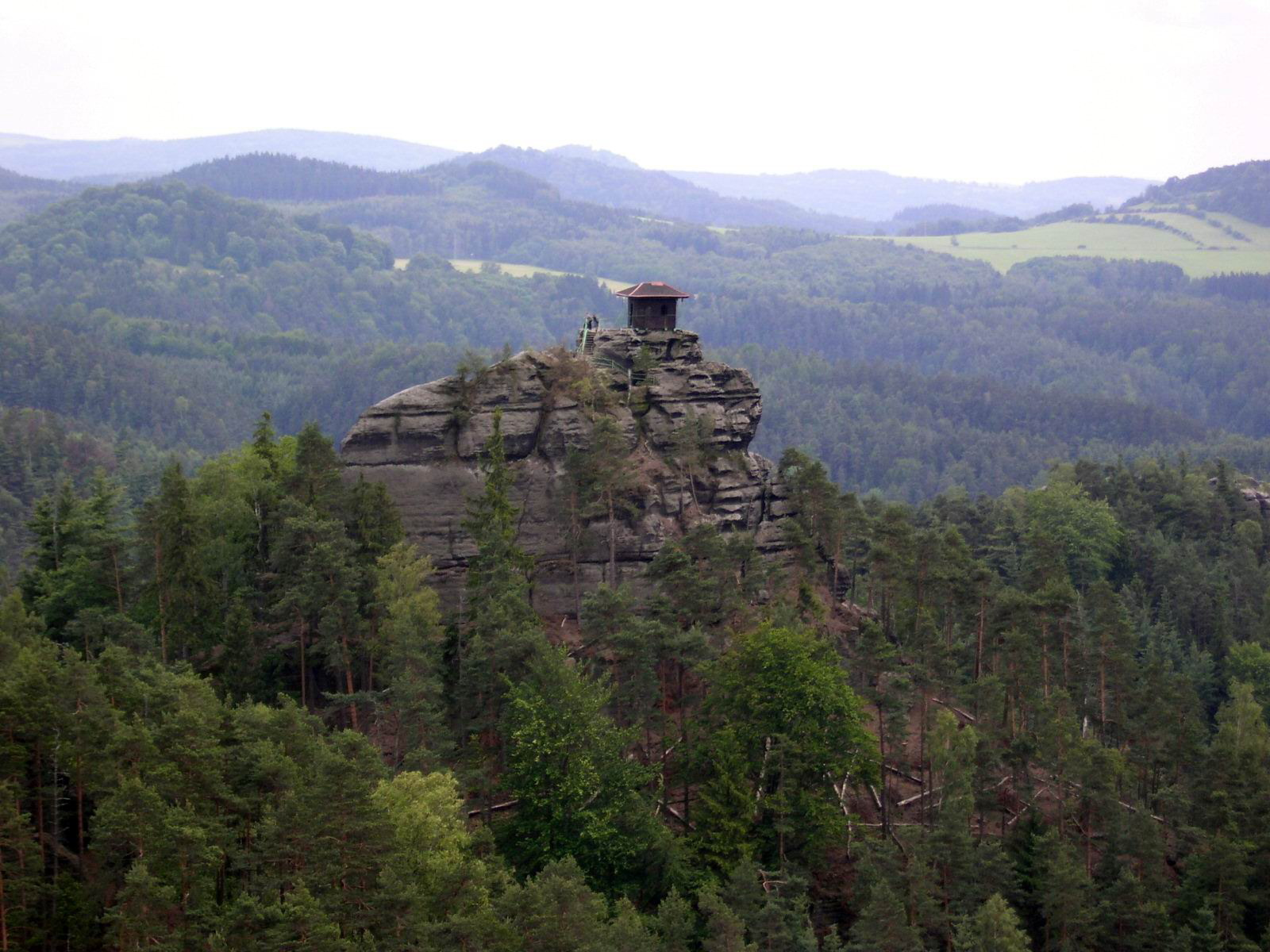
- The Marienfels

Highest point
- Elevation: 428 m (1,404 ft)
- Coordinates: 50°51′36″N 14°24′17″E

Geography
- Location within Czech Republic
- Location: Czech Republic
- Parent range: Bohemian Switzerland

Geology
- Mountain type: Sandstone

Mariina skála (German: Marienfels) is a 428 m rocky hill in the Czech Republic, located in the region of Bohemian Switzerland not far from Jetřichovice. It was named in the 19th century after Princess Marie Kinsky. Before that, the hill was known as the "Spitzgestein" or "Grosser Spitziger". The hill is a famous viewing point in Bohemian Switzerland.

In 1856 a wooden refuge hut was erected on the hilltop by Ferdinand Bonaventura, 7th Prince Kinsky of Wchinitz and Tettau, that acted as a fire observation tower. On the night of 9 September 2005, the hut was badly damaged by a forest fire. The cost of the damage came to 200,000 CZK. Another forest fire in the area of the Marienfelsen occurred on 22 July 2006. The hut, which had been replaced just three weeks earlier, escaped further damage.

The Kinsky family did a lot of work in the 19th century in opening up the rock landscape around Jetřichovice.
