= Anna Perthen =

Member of the Senate
- In office 1920–1925
- Constituency: Mladá Boleslav

Personal details
- Born: Anna Nickel; 22 December 1866 Jílové, Bohemia, Austrian Empire
- Died: 11 December 1957 (aged 90) Magdala, East Germany

Anna Perthen (22 December 1866 – 11 December 1957) was a Czechoslovak politician. In 1920 she was one of the first group of women elected to the Senate, remaining in parliament until 1925.

== Biography ==
Perthen was born Anna Nickel in Jílové in Bohemia, Austrian Empire (today in the Czech Republic) in 1866. She began working in a factory in Bodenbach at the age of 12, and continued to work there until she married. She became involved with the Social Democratic Workers' Party of Austria, chairing the Imperial Women's Social Democratic Committee and becoming a member of Bodenbach municipal council.

Following the independence of Czechoslovakia at the end of World War I, Perthen became a member of the German Social Democratic Workers' Party (DSAP) and chair of its women's committee. She was a DSAP candidate for the Senate in the 1920 parliamentary elections, and was one of sixteen women elected to parliament. She remained in parliament until 1925. After World War II she was deported to Germany, where she settled in the Soviet occupation zone, later East Germany. She died in Magdala in 1957.
