= Růžovský vrch =

Mountain in Srbská Kamenice, Czech Republic

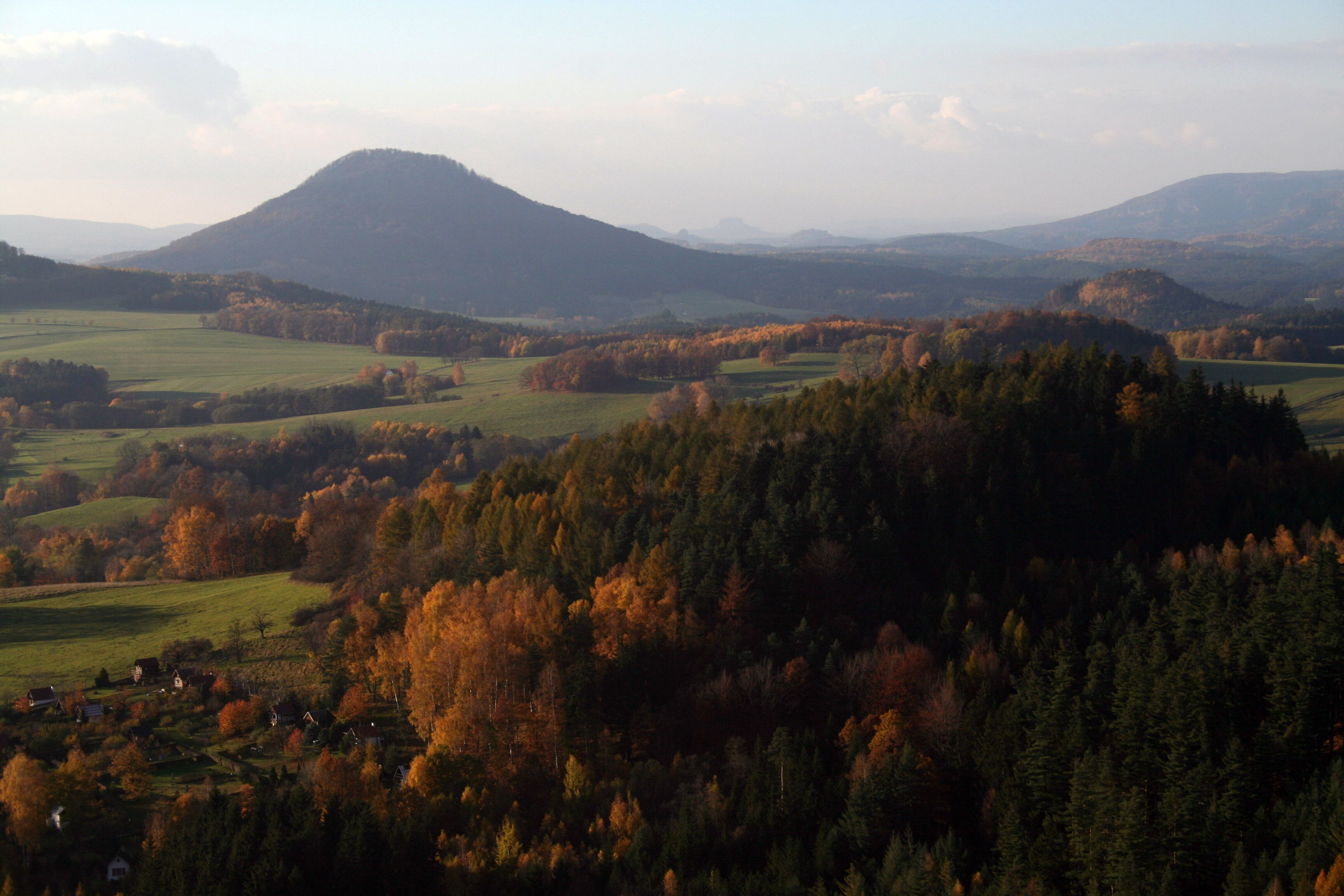
- View from the east

Highest point
- Elevation: 619 m (2,031 ft)
- Prominence: 331 m (1,086 ft)
- Isolation: 8.4 km (5.2 mi)
- Coordinates: 50°49′58″N 14°19′52″E

Geography
- Location within Czech Republic
- Location: Ústí nad Labem Region, Czech Republic
- Parent range: Elbe Sandstone Mountains

Geology
- Mountain type: cone mountain
- Rock type: Basalt

Climbing
- Access: Construction of the first observation tower in 1881

Růžák
- IUCN category Ia (strict nature reserve)
- Interactive map of Růžák
- Area: 97.7 ha (241 acres)
- Max. elevation: 619 m (2,031 ft)
- Min. elevation: 350 m (1,150 ft)
- Established: 29 December 1973
- Operator: AOPK ČR

The Růžovský vrch (German: Rosenberg) is a mountain in the Elbe Sandstone Mountains in the Czech Republic. The summit is located in the municipality of Růžová in the Ústí nad Labem Region. The mountain is protected as a national nature reserve named Růžák.

== Geomorphology and geology ==
With an elevation of 619 metres (2,031 ft), Růžovský vrch is a dominant feature of the landscape. Its almost circular cone shape makes it one of the most typical representatives of the mountains of the region. The upper part of the mountain is made of basalt, whilst at its foot sandstone is also found. The flanks of the mountain are covered by an almost virgin deciduous forest, in which mighty beech and sycamore are especially impressive.

== Protection of nature ==
The mountain is located within the Bohemian Switzerland National Park. Since 1973, the mountain has been protected as the Růžák National Nature Reserve due to the "protection of natural mixed vegetation and typical megatherm flora on a basalt substrate". The national nature reserve has an area of 97.7 ha (241 acres)

== Gallery ==
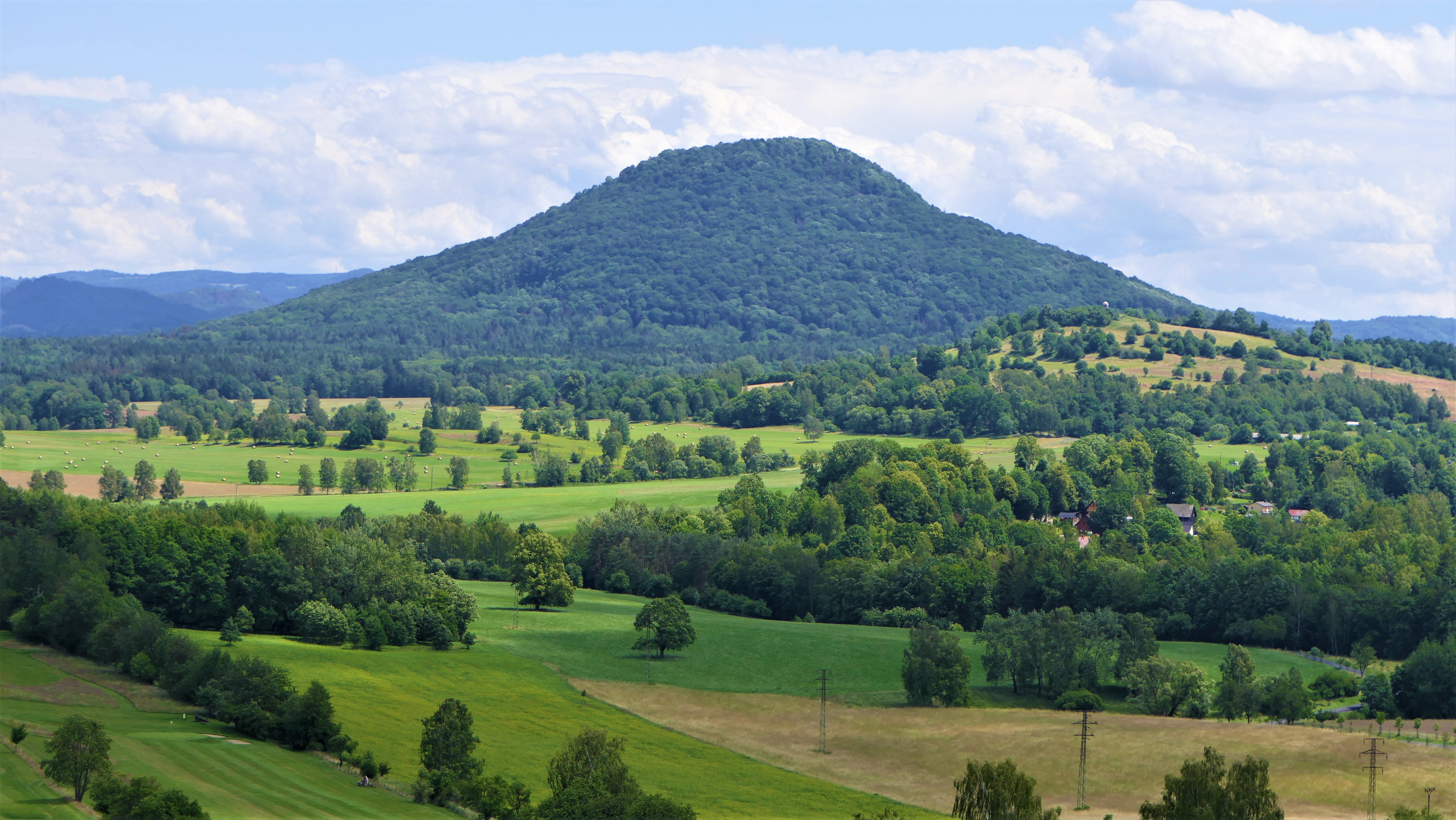
View from the northwest

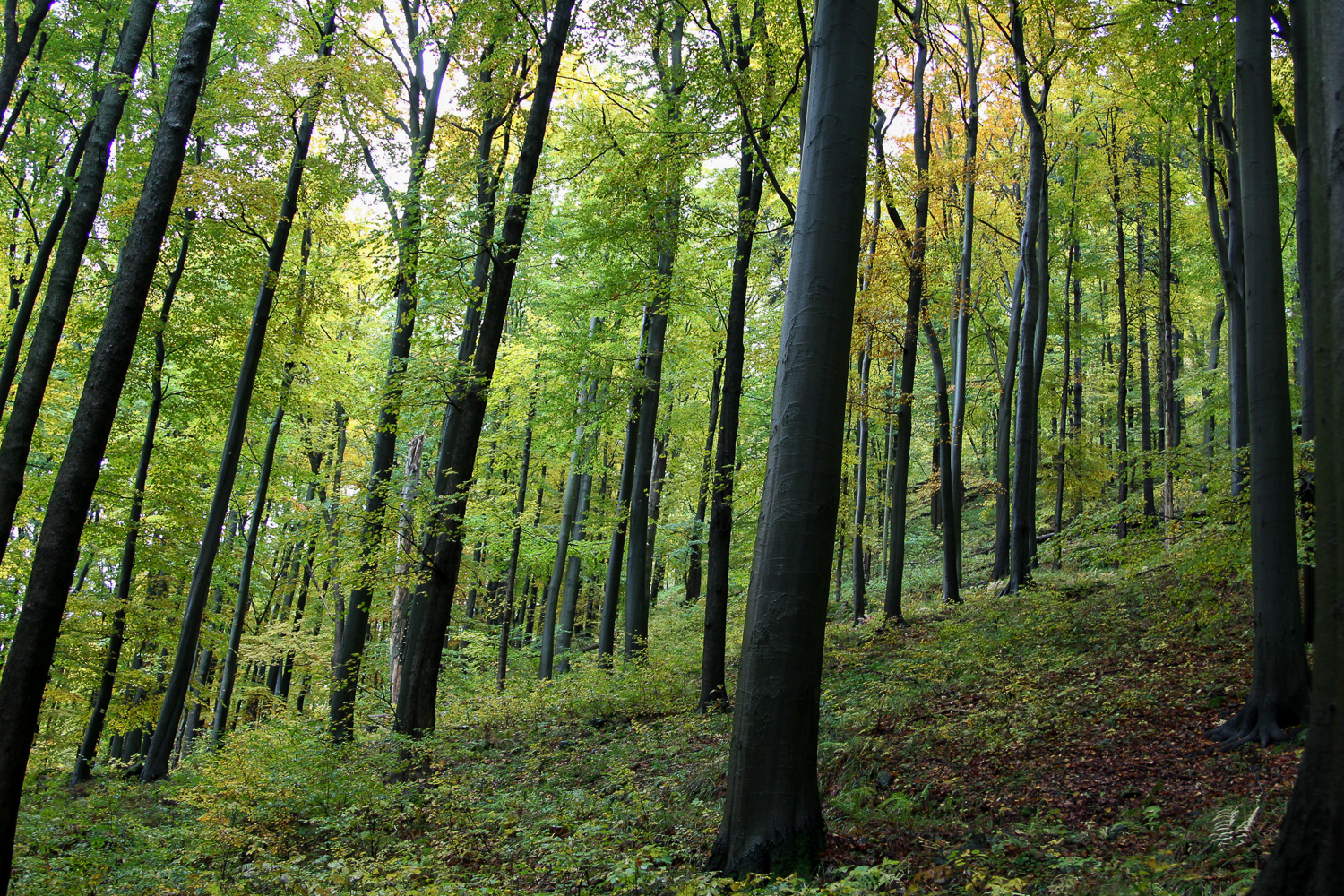
Beech forest on the slopes of the mountain
