= Jílové =

- Town
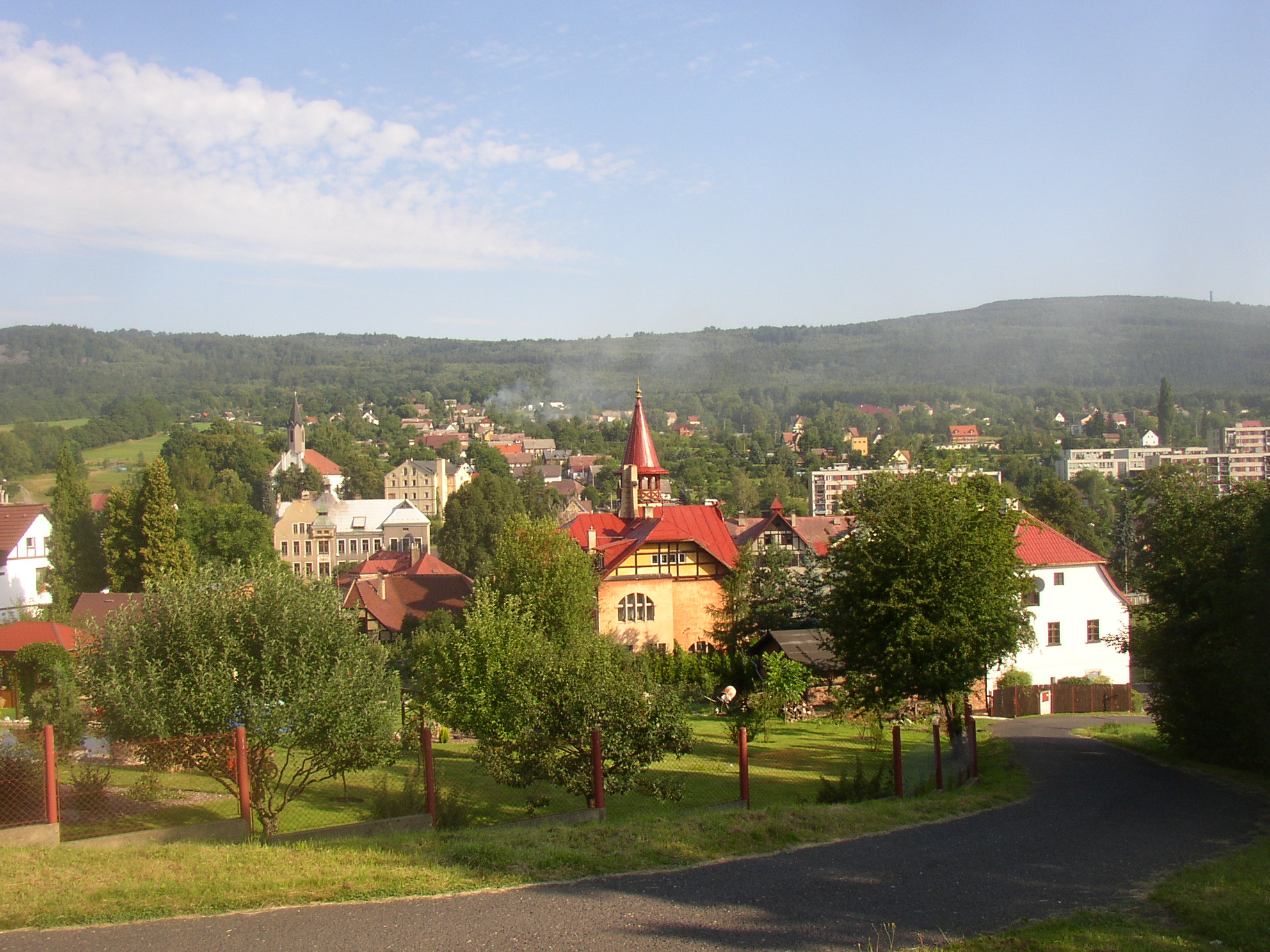
- View from the south

- Flag Coat of arms

- Location in the Czech Republic
- Coordinates: 50°45′45″N 14°6′18″E
- Country: Czech Republic
- Region: Ústí nad Labem
- District: Děčín
- First mentioned: 1348

Government
  - Mayor: Kateřina Sýkorová

Area
  - Total: 36.56 km^{2} (14.12 sq mi)
- Elevation: 276 m (906 ft)

Population (2026-01-01)
  - Total: 4,891
  - Density: 133.8/km^{2} (346.5/sq mi)
- Time zone: UTC+1 (CET)
  - Summer (DST): UTC+2 (CEST)
- Postal codes: 405 02, 407 01, 407 02
- Website: www.mujilove.cz

Jílové (Czech pronunciation: [ˈjiːlovɛː]; until 1945 Jílové u Podmokel; German: Eulau) is a town in Děčín District in the Ústí nad Labem Region of the Czech Republic. It has about 4,900 inhabitants. The town is located on the stream Jílovský potok in the Elbe Sandstone Mountains.

== Administrative division ==
Jílové consists of six municipal parts (in brackets population according to the 2021 census):

- Jílové (1,171)
- Kamenec (217)
- Kamenná (2,175)
- Martiněves (900)
- Modrá (370)
- Sněžník (102)

== Etymology ==
The Czech adjective jílové is derived from jíl, i.e. 'clay'. The name was probably transferred to the settlement from the local stream.

== Geography ==
Jílové is located about 6 kilometres (4 mi) west of Děčín and 10 kilometres (6 mi) north of Ústí nad Labem. It lies in the Elbe Sandstone Mountains and in Labské Pískovce Protected Landscape Area. The built-up area is situated in the valley of the stream Jílovský potok, a left tributary of the Elbe River. The town is located at the foot of the mountain Děčínský Sněžník, which is the highest peak of the municipal territory at 723 m (2,372 ft) above sea level.

== History ==
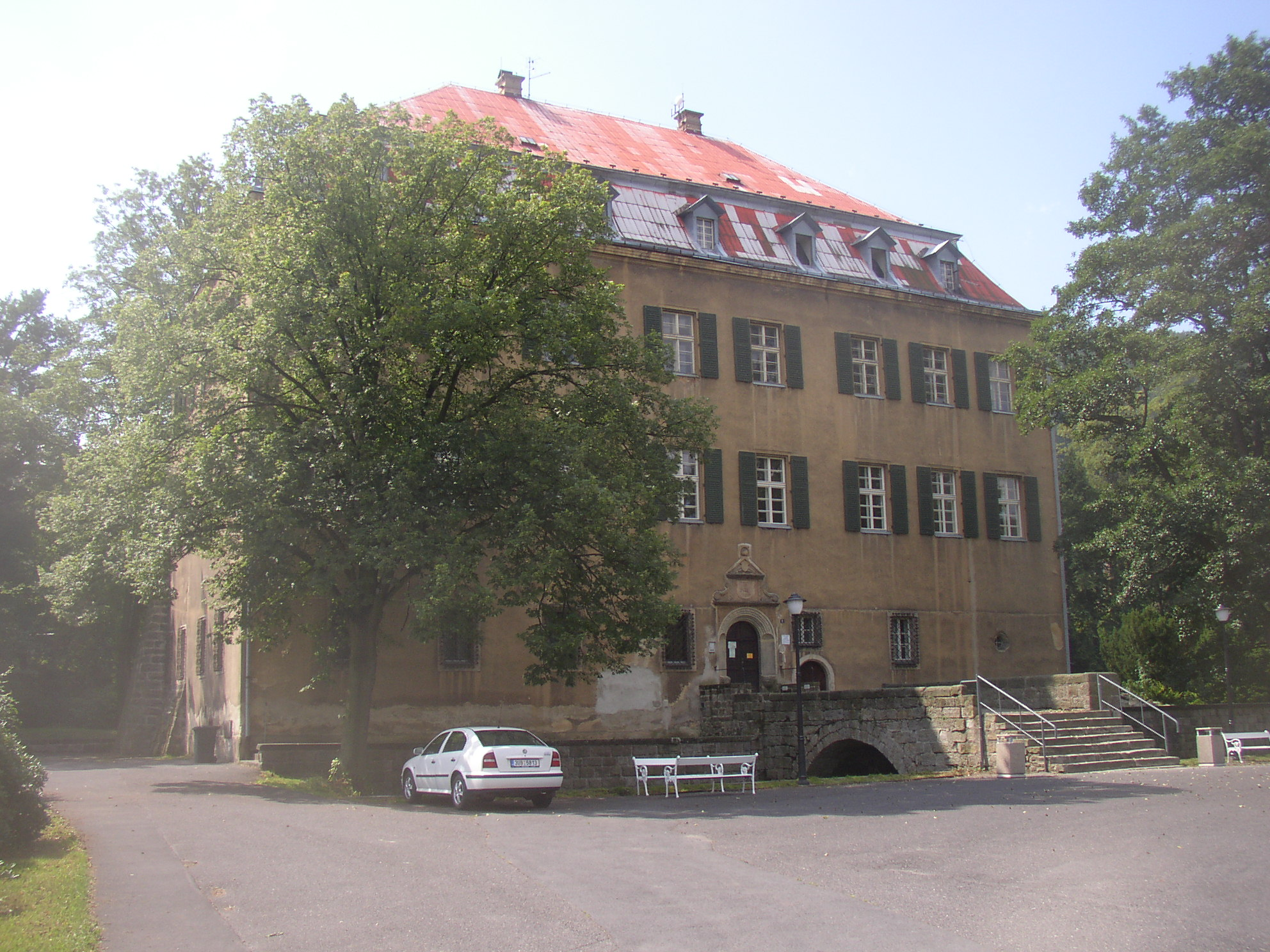
Jílové Castle

Jílové was probably founded as a settlement on an ancient trade route from Bohemia to Lusatia. The nearby mountain Lotarův vrch may already had been the site of the 1126 Battle of Chlumec between Duke Soběslav I of Bohemia and King Lothair III of Germany, whose exact location is unknown. The first written mention of Jílové (under the name Eulow) is in a deed from 1384 issued by King Charles IV.

A local water castle, erected in the 14th century, was documented in 1554, when it was held by the Lords of Lípa. After the 1620 Battle of White Mountain, the estates were seized by Emperor Ferdinand II and in 1629 granted to the Thun und Hohenstein family.

After World War II, the German-speaking population was expelled and the Thun und Hohenstein properties were confiscated by the Czechoslovak Republic. Jílové was promoted to a town in 1964.

== Demographics ==
Historical population

| Year | Pop. | ±% |
|---|---|---|
| 1869 | 4,002 | — |
| 1880 | 4,120 | +2.9% |
| 1890 | 4,535 | +10.1% |
| 1900 | 4,590 | +1.2% |
| 1910 | 4,947 | +7.8% |

| Year | Pop. | ±% |
|---|---|---|
| 1921 | 4,570 | −7.6% |
| 1930 | 5,558 | +21.6% |
| 1950 | 3,935 | −29.2% |
| 1961 | 4,036 | +2.6% |
| 1970 | 3,803 | −5.8% |

| Year | Pop. | ±% |
|---|---|---|
| 1980 | 4,920 | +29.4% |
| 1991 | 5,195 | +5.6% |
| 2001 | 5,259 | +1.2% |
| 2011 | 4,941 | −6.0% |
| 2021 | 4,935 | −0.1% |

Source: Censuses

== Transport ==
The I/13 road (the section from Teplice to Děčín) runs through the town.

During the tourist season, on weekends and holidays, a train on the Děčín–Telnice line runs through Jílové. The ČSD Class M 152.0 retro train drives there.

== Sights ==
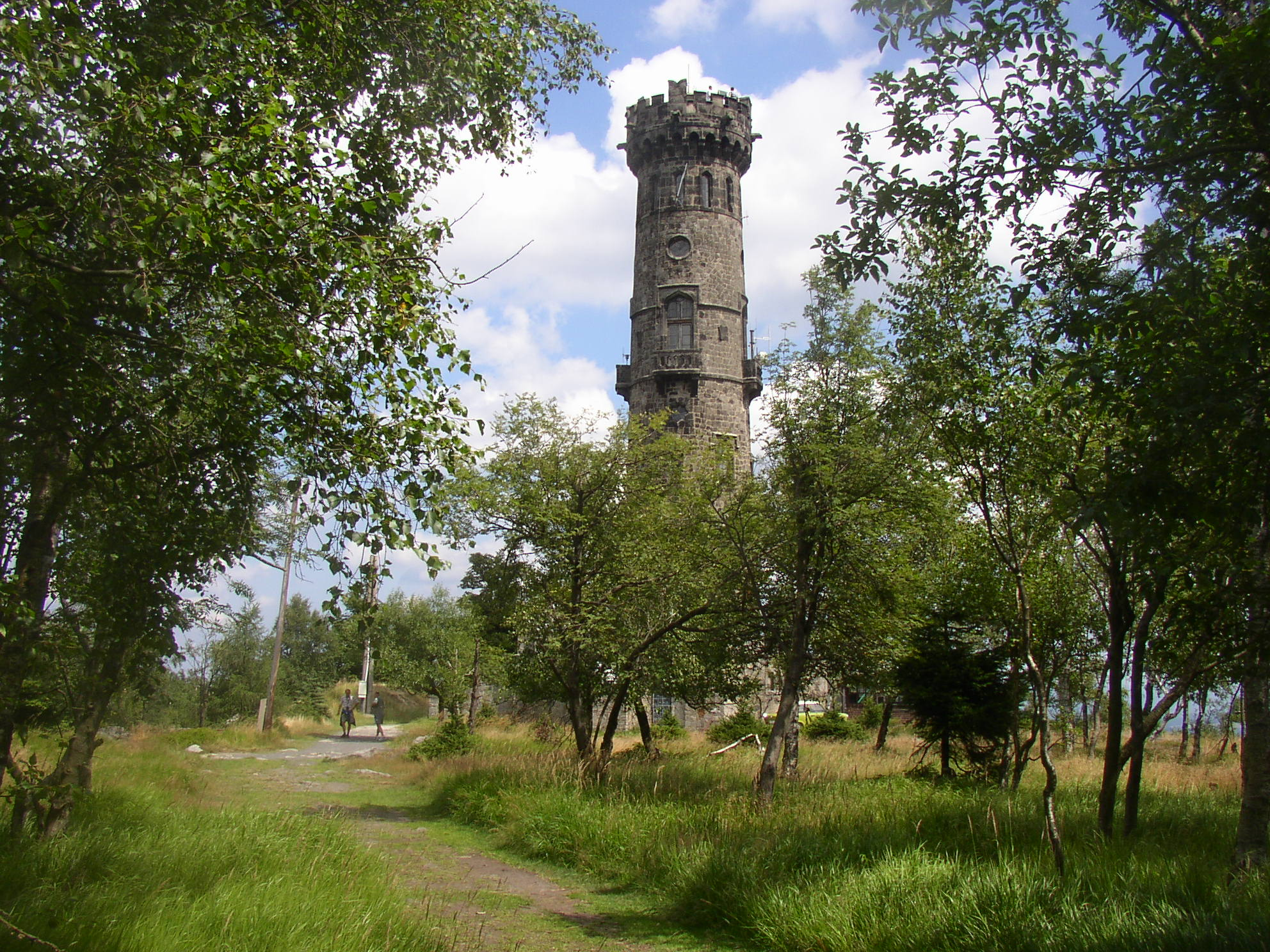
Děčínský Sněžník observation tower

The main landmark is the Jílové Castle. In the second half of the 17th century, it was rebuilt into a Renaissance residence, and the romantic-style park with a Neoclassical pavilion was established two centuries later. Nowadays the castle serves cultural and social purposes and houses a library.

The Church of the Holy Trinity was built in the Baroque style in 1682. It was rebuilt to its present form in 1859, after it was damaged by a fire.

Děčínský Sněžník is known for its observation tower. It is a 33 metres (108 ft) high stone tower. Built in 1864, it is one of the oldest observation towers in Bohemia. The chapel on Děčínský Sněžník was built in 1909.

== Notable people ==
- Anna Perthen (1866–1957), politician
- Ernst Paul (1897–1978), German politician

== Twin towns – sister cities ==
Jílové is twinned with:

- Rosenthal-Bielatal, Germany
