= Chapel on the Rock =

Catholic chapel in Allenspark, Colorado, US

Coordinates: 40°14′49″N 105°32′08″W

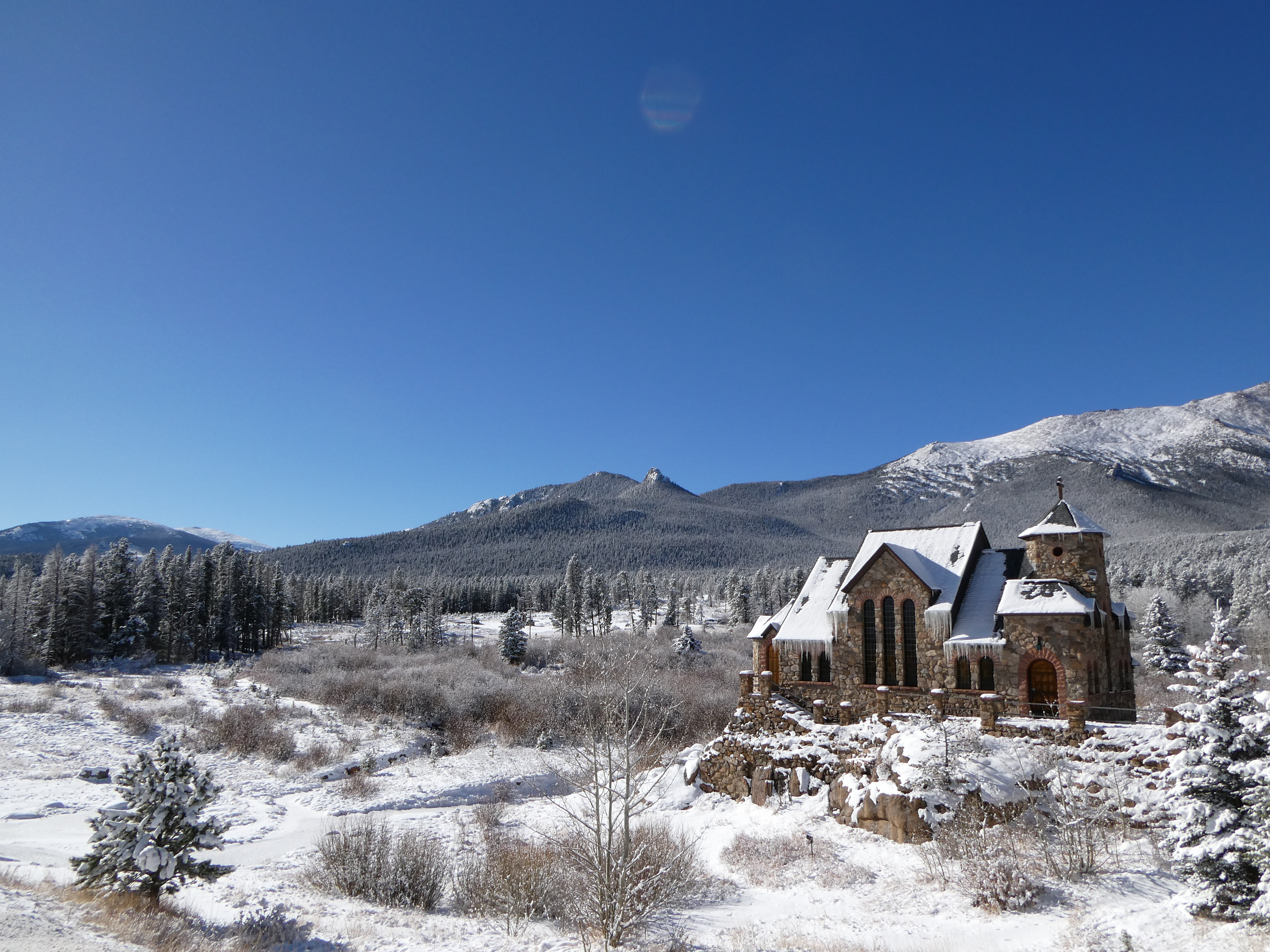
Chapel on The Rock, November 2023

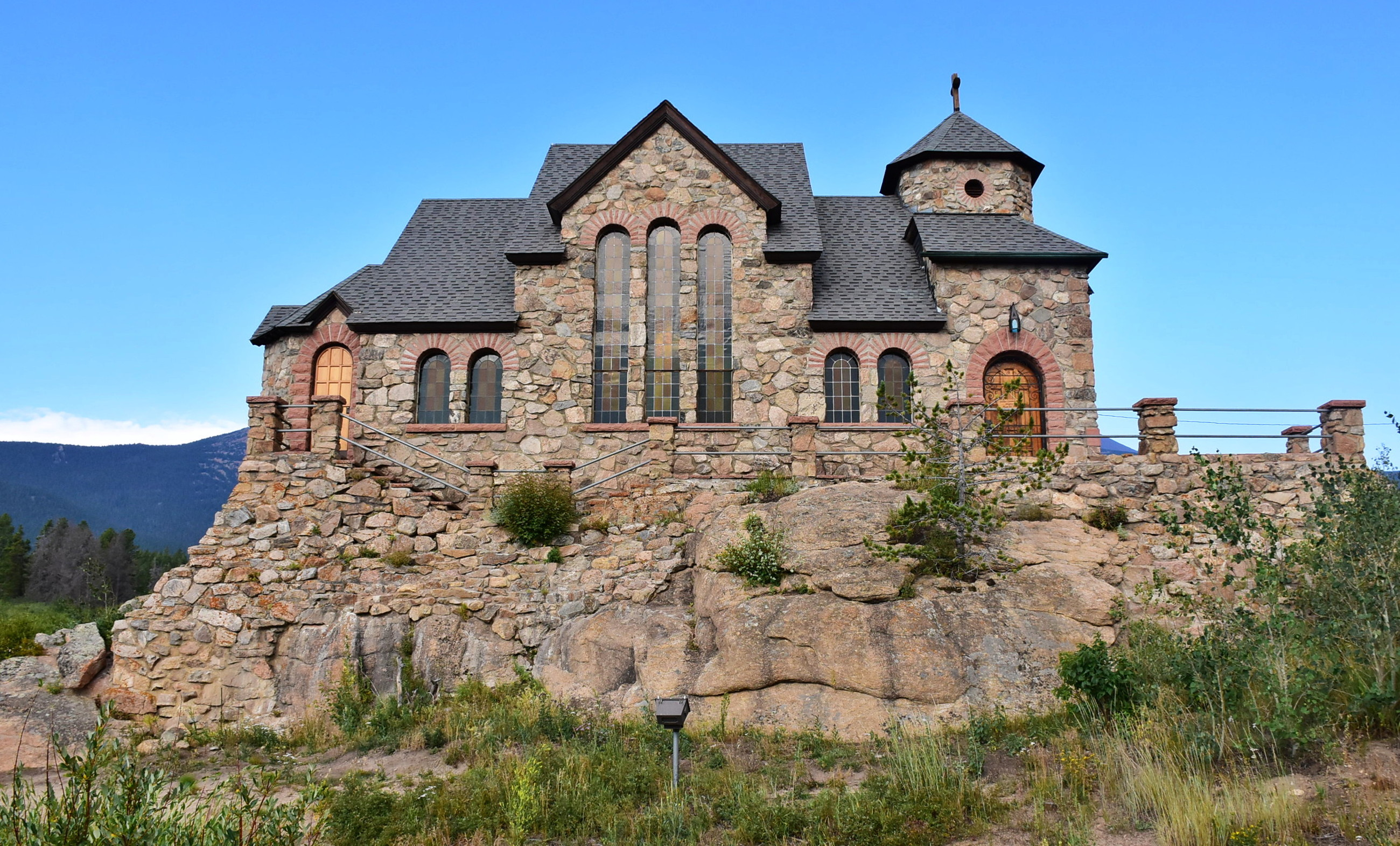
Chapel on the Rock, August 2018

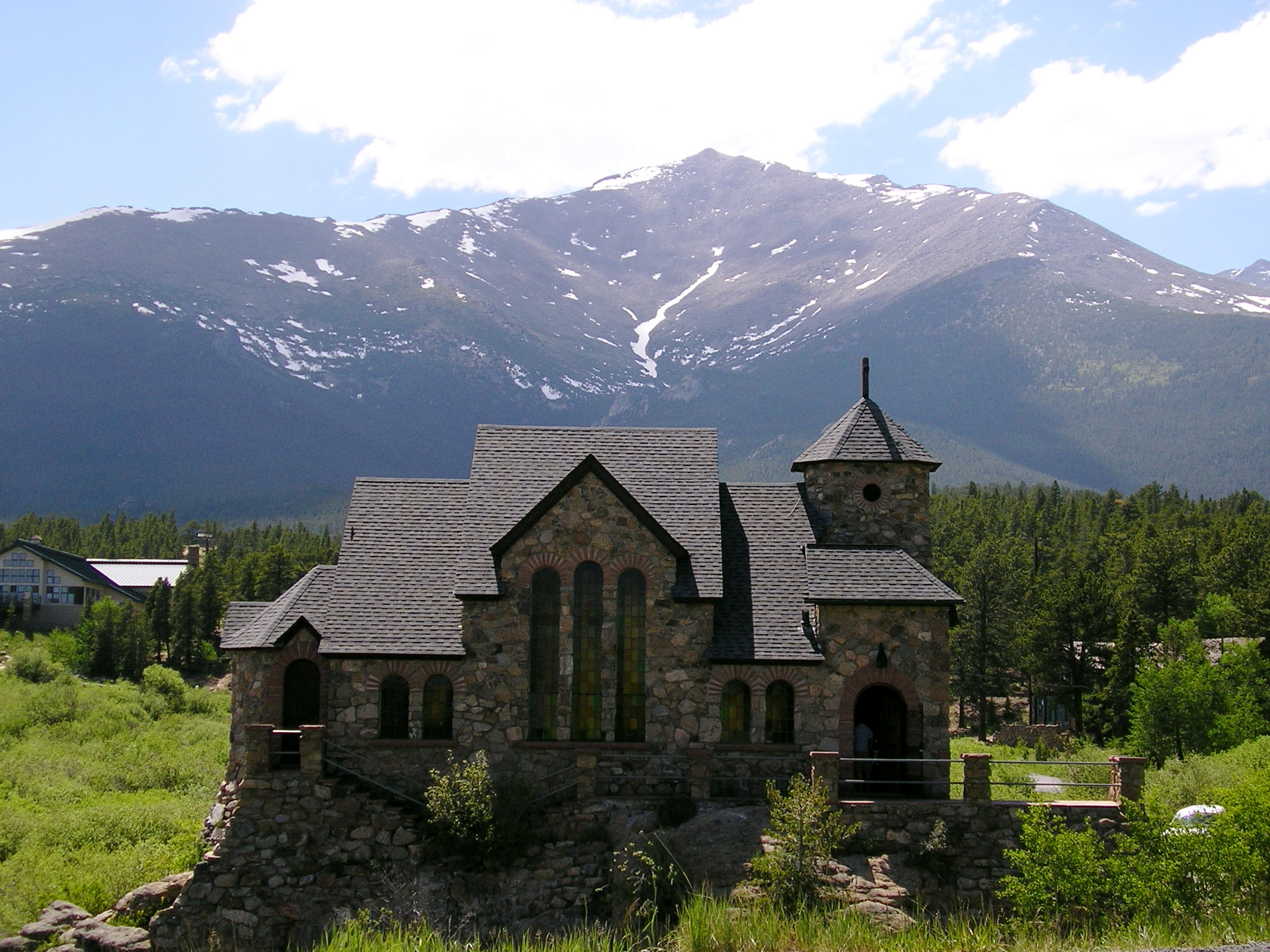
The Chapel on the Rock at Camp Saint Malo near Allenspark, Colorado

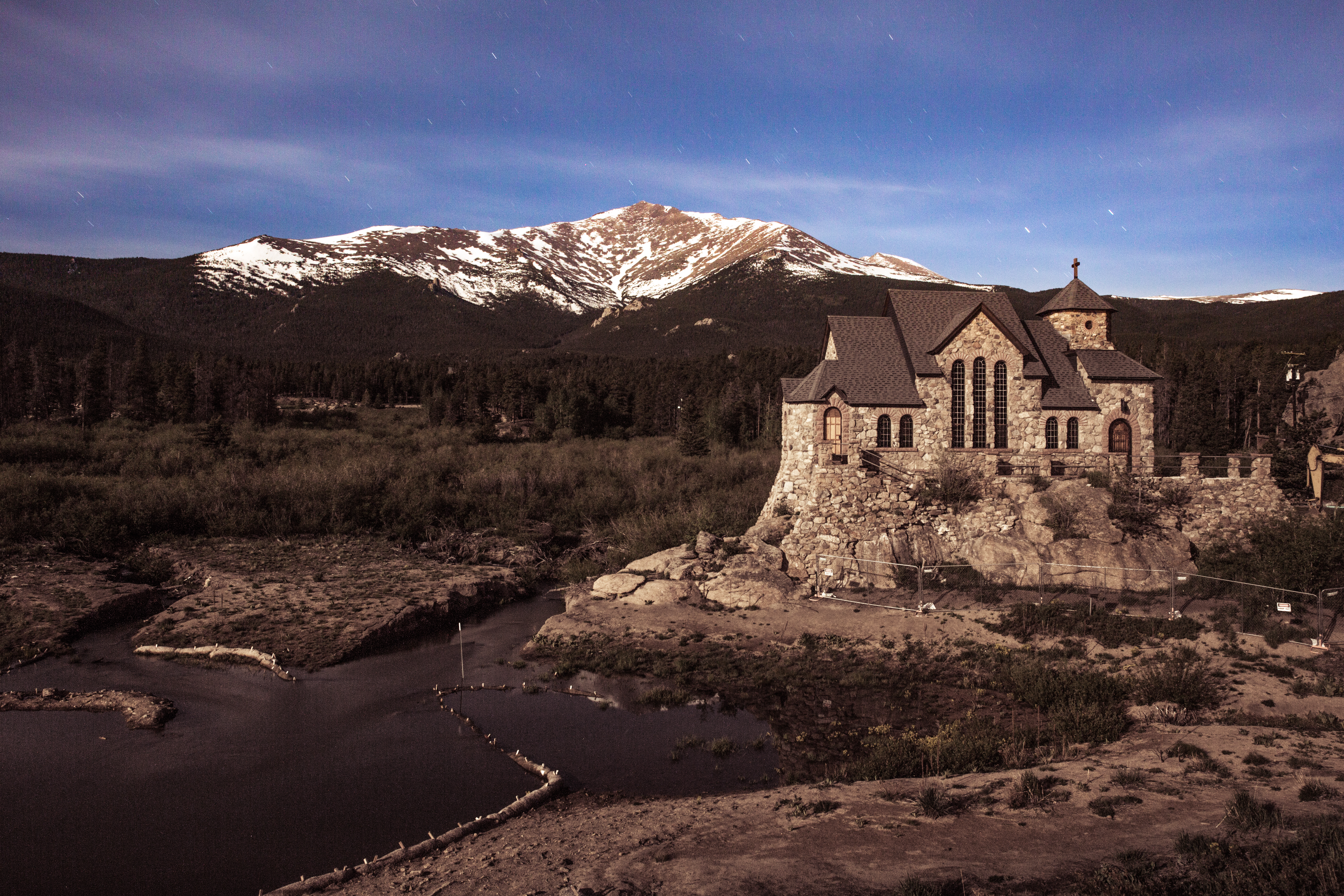
Saint Malo's Chapel on the Rock with Mt. Meeker in the background

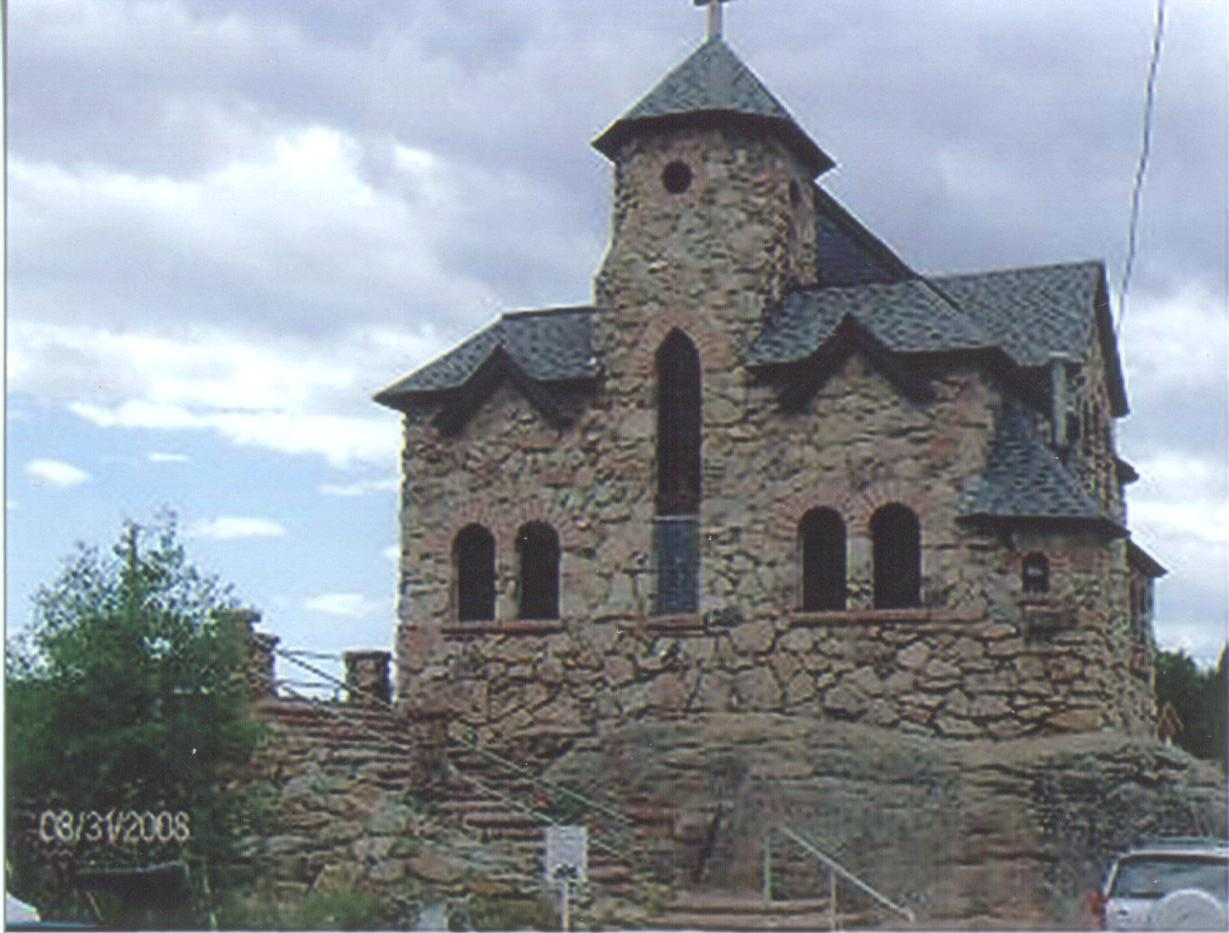
The Chapel on the Rock as seen from the parking lot

The Chapel on the Rock (officially, Saint Catherine of Siena Chapel) is a functioning Catholic chapel and tourist landmark in Allenspark, Colorado, US. The chapel is located on the grounds of the Saint Malo Retreat, Conference, and Spiritual Center of the Catholic Archdiocese of Denver. The chapel is open to the public.

== History ==
In 1916, Monsignor Joseph Bosetti came across a large rock formation just east of Rocky Mountain National Park and inspired by the Biblical phrase "upon this rock I will build my church", he envisioned a church built on the rock. His lack of funds delayed construction for nearly 20 years and he struggled with the Colorado Highway Department to keep the rock intact. Eventually, land for the church was donated by Mr. and Mrs. Oscar Malo and Denver architect Jacques Benedict designed the chapel, which was completed in 1936. In 1999 Boulder County designated the chapel as a historic site.

Pope John Paul II prayed at the chapel during his visit to Denver for World Youth Day in 1993; he blessed the chapel afterwards. The pope later hiked in the surrounding woods and spent some time at the Saint Malo Retreat Center.

In November 2011 the Chapel on the Rock was spared from a devastating fire that destroyed a majority of the retreat center, forcing it to close its doors.

During the historic flooding of September 2013 the Chapel on the Rock survived, though much of the surrounding terrain was destroyed.
