= Děčínský Sněžník =

Mountain in the Czech Republic

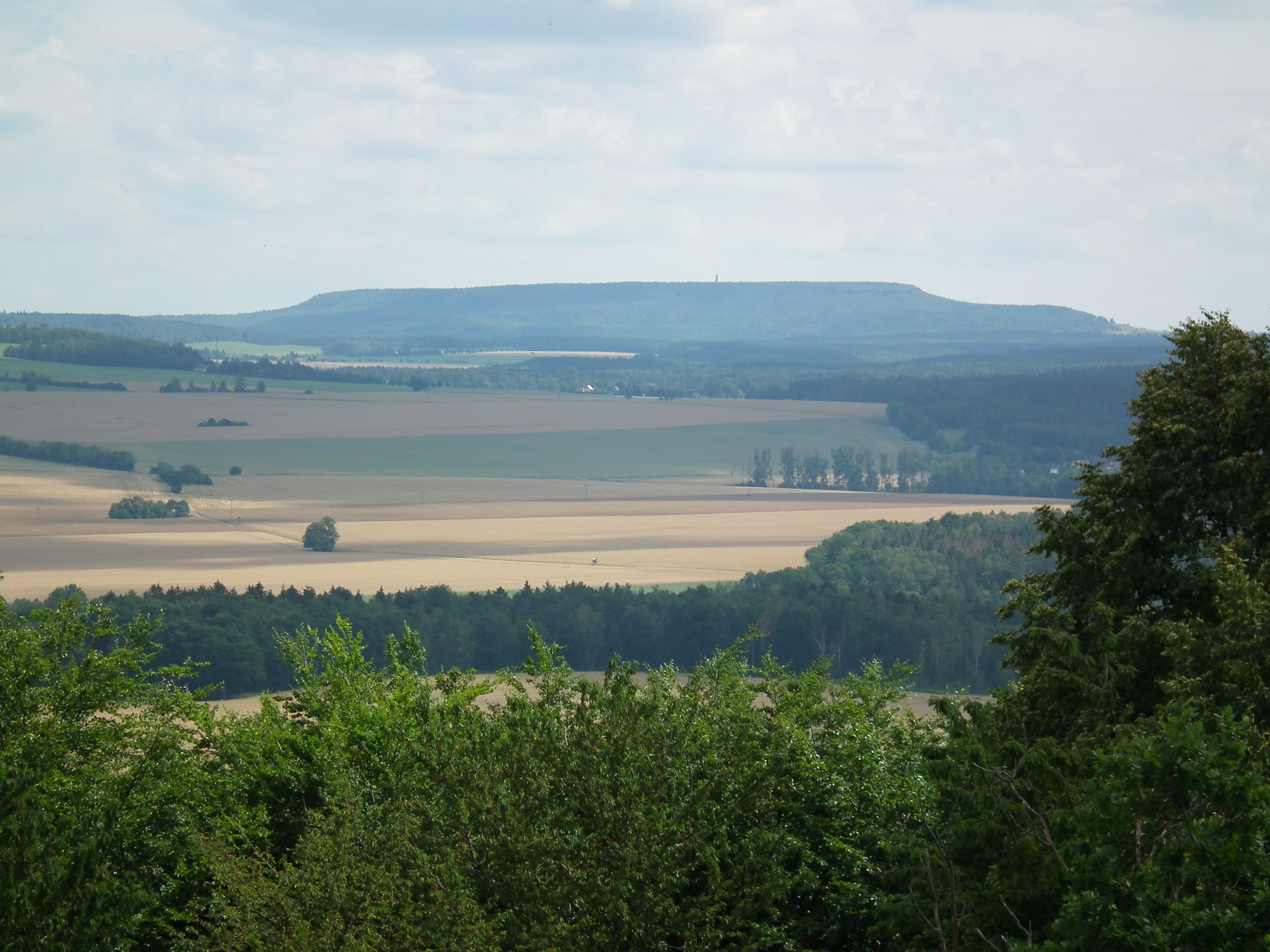
- Děčínský Sněžník from the northwest

Highest point
- Elevation: 723.5 m (2,374 ft)
- Prominence: 151.5 m (497 ft)
- Isolation: 12.9 km (8.0 mi)
- Coordinates: 50°47′35″N 14°6′31″E

Geography
- Location within Czech Republic
- Location: Jílové, Ústí nad Labem Region, Czech Republic
- Parent range: Elbe Sandstone Mountains

The Děčínský Sněžník (German: Hoher Schneeberg) is a mountain in the Czech Republic. At 723.5 m (2,374 ft) above sea level, it is the highest peak of the Elbe Sandstone Mountains.

== Geography ==
Děčínský Sněžník is located in the Elbe Sandstone Mountains in the Ústí nad Labem Region. It is located mostly in the Jílové municipality, only the eastern slopes are located in the territory of Děčín.

The mountain is the highest mesa in the Czech Republic.

== Tourism ==
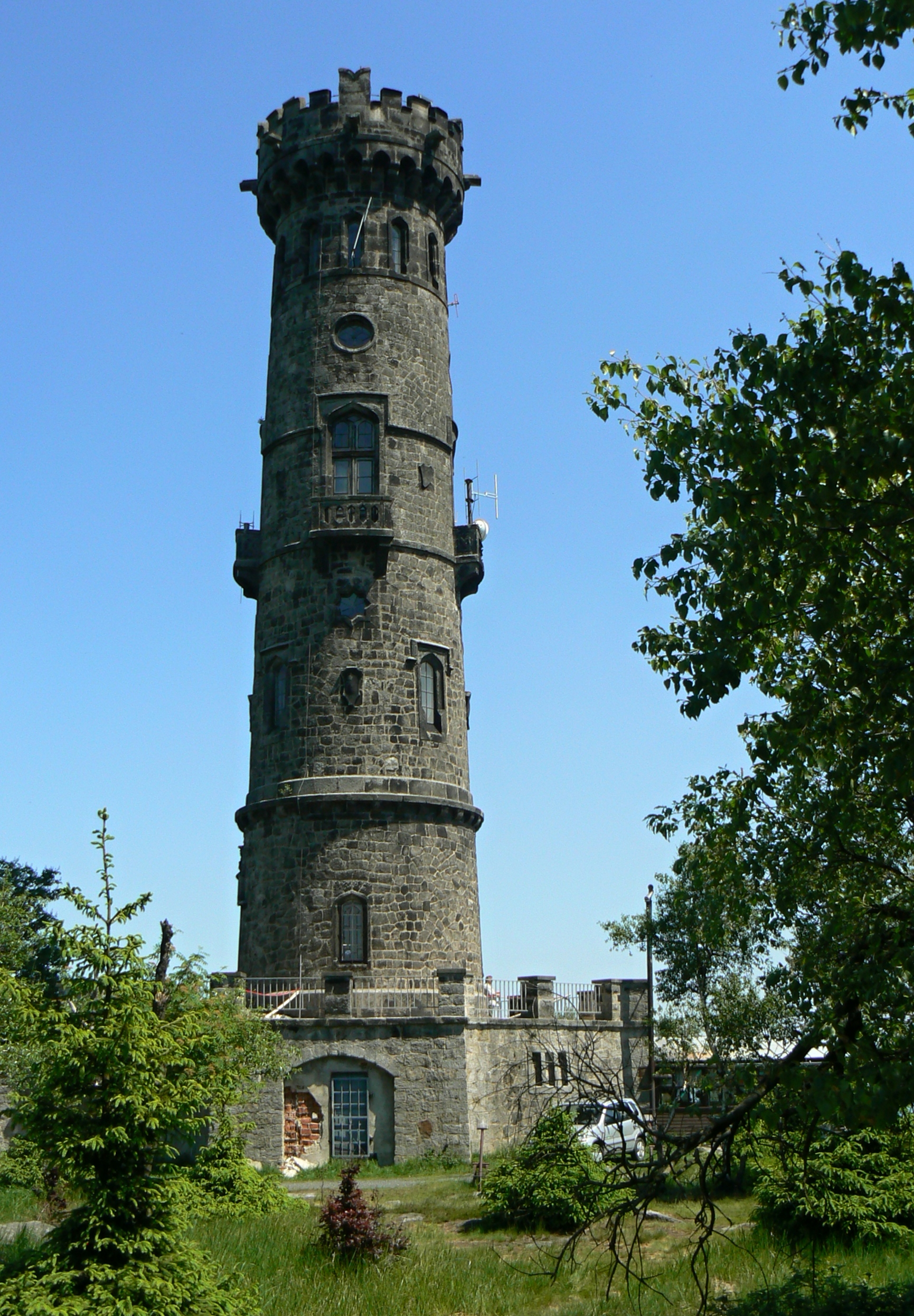
Observation tower

=== History ===
One of the first historical figures to visit Děčínský Sněžník was Emperor Joseph II, who climbed the peak in September 1779. The Sněžník was considered an important geodetic point for triangulation and cartographers asked the owner of the principality of Děčín, Prince Franz of Thun and Hohenstein, for permission to establish the peak as a triangulation point. Prince Franz contracted the Dresden architect, Karl Moritz Haenel, to design a stone observation tower. The construction of the Neo-gothic tower at the summit of the Sněžník began in 1863. A nearby fault line a source of building material, the tower was finished in autumn 1864. Originally used by geodesists, the view attracted many visitors and in 1865 the local forest administration decided to build a small hostelry for them.

The observation tower at Děčínský Sněžník has remained a popular tourist attraction and lasted, with small modifications, for more than 80 years. After the Second World War the hostelry was abandoned as it had to be pulled down. Likewise the tower deteriorated and, by the 1980s, was in poor condition. Vandals contributed to the degradation of the tower, and its masonry started to collapse. The tower was assigned to the monument fund of the State Monument Preservation, but this formal step did not bring any improvement. In 1992 two million CZK were collected for the renovation of the tower, and this was followed by the erection of a new inn. Since summer 1992 the tower at Děčínský Sněžník has again been open to the public and the peak is once again a popular tourist destination.

=== Present ===
The observation tower is 33 m (108 ft) high, 153 steps lead to the observation deck. The tower offers a panoramic view over Bohemian and Saxon Switzerland, and Lusatian Mountains.

The summit is a stop on the E3 European long distance path. Ascents may be made from the town of Jílové or from the German municipality of Rosenthal-Bielatal to the north.
