= Růžová =

- Municipality
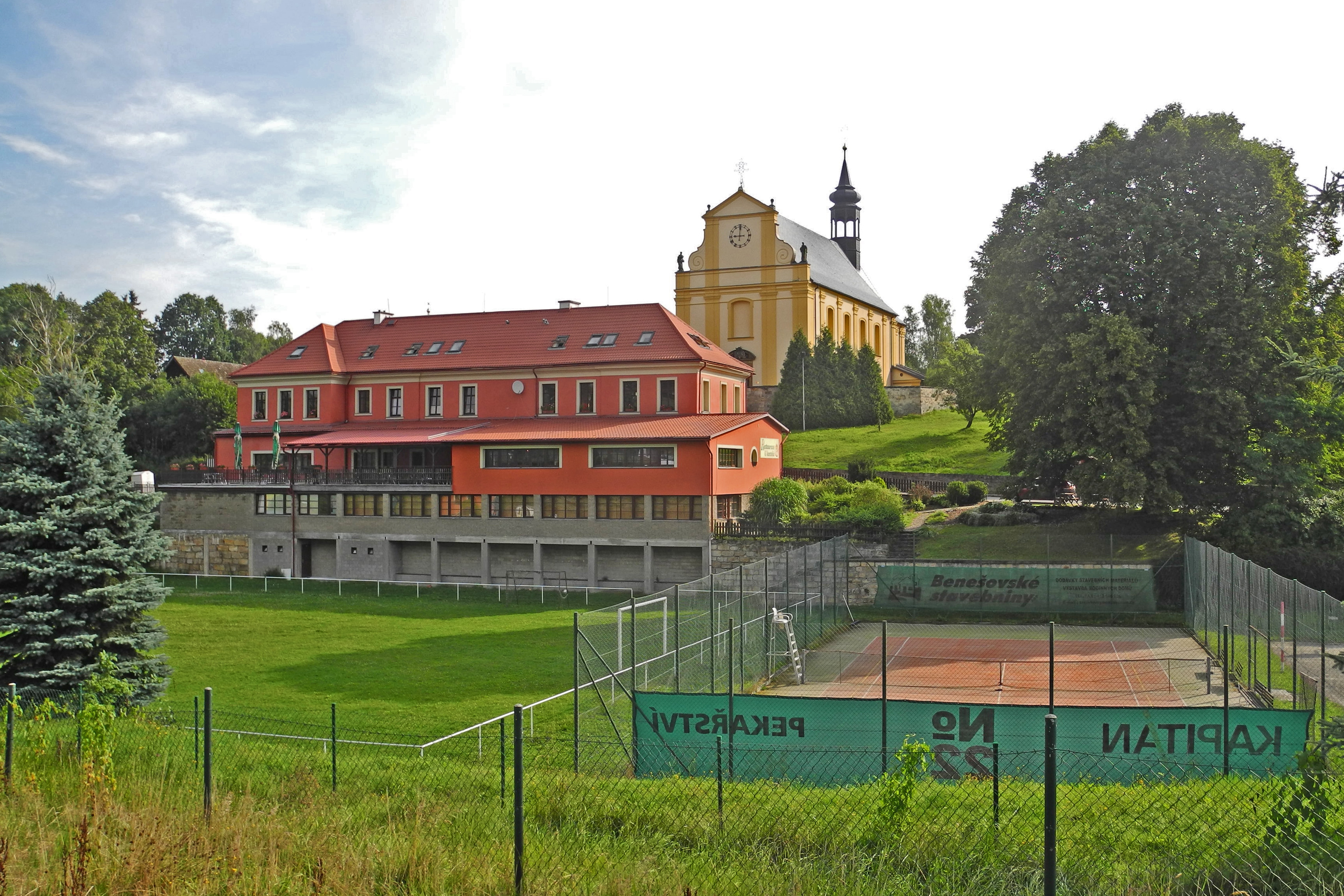
- Municipal office and the Church of Saints Peter and Paul

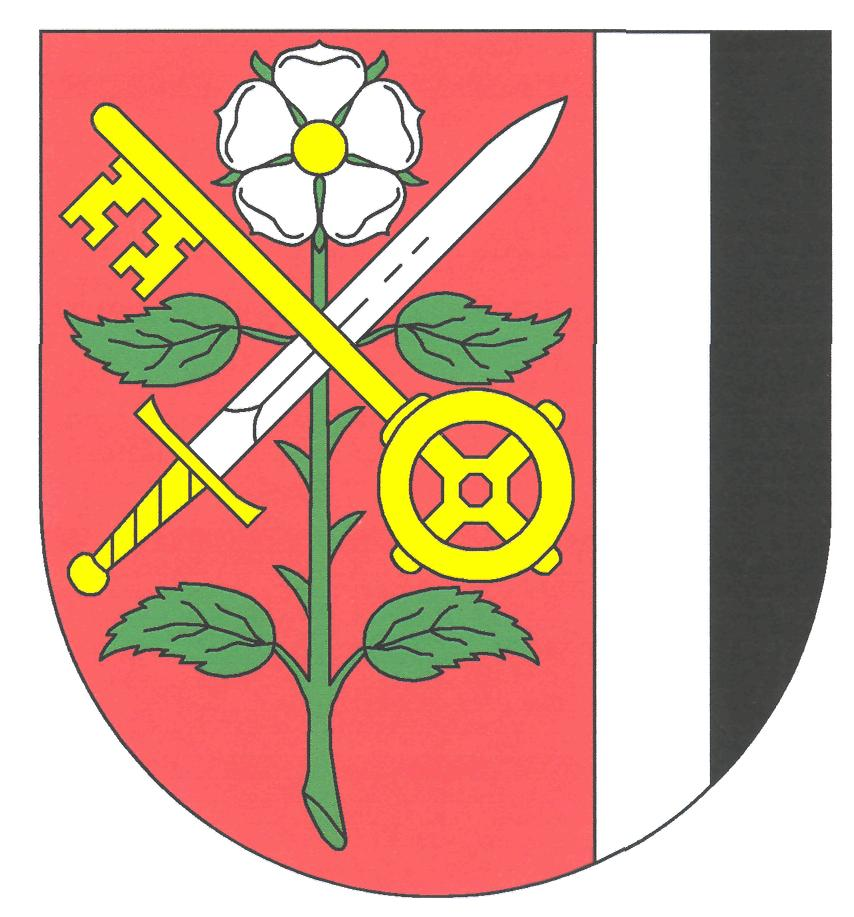
- Flag Coat of arms

- Location in the Czech Republic
- Coordinates: 50°50′32″N 14°17′38″E
- Country: Czech Republic
- Region: Ústí nad Labem
- District: Děčín
- First mentioned: 1352

Area
  - Total: 17.87 km^{2} (6.90 sq mi)
- Elevation: 318 m (1,043 ft)

Population (2026-01-01)
  - Total: 602
  - Density: 33.7/km^{2} (87.3/sq mi)
- Time zone: UTC+1 (CET)
  - Summer (DST): UTC+2 (CEST)
- Postal code: 405 02
- Website: www.obec-ruzova.cz

Růžová (German: Rosendorf) is a municipality and village in Děčín District in the Ústí nad Labem Region of the Czech Republic. It has about 600 inhabitants. The folk architecture in the village of Kamenická Stráň is well preserved and is protected as a village monument zone.

Růžová lies approximately 12 kilometres (7 mi) north-east of Děčín, 28 km (17 mi) north-east of Ústí nad Labem, and 85 km (53 mi) north of Prague.

== Administrative division ==
Růžová consists of two municipal parts (in brackets population according to the 2021 census):

- Růžová (535)
- Kamenická Stráň (16)

== Demographics ==
Historical population
Year	Pop.	±%
1869	1,889	—
1880	1,940	+2.7%
1890	1,874	−3.4%
1900	1,874	+0.0%
1910	1,766	−5.8%
1921	1,429	−19.1%
1930	1,487	+4.1%
1950	437	−70.6%
1961	383	−12.4%
1970	291	−24.0%
1980	254	−12.7%
1991	201	−20.9%
2001	340	+69.2%
2011	395	+16.2%
2021	551	+39.5%
Source: Censuses
