= Jetřichovice =

- Municipality
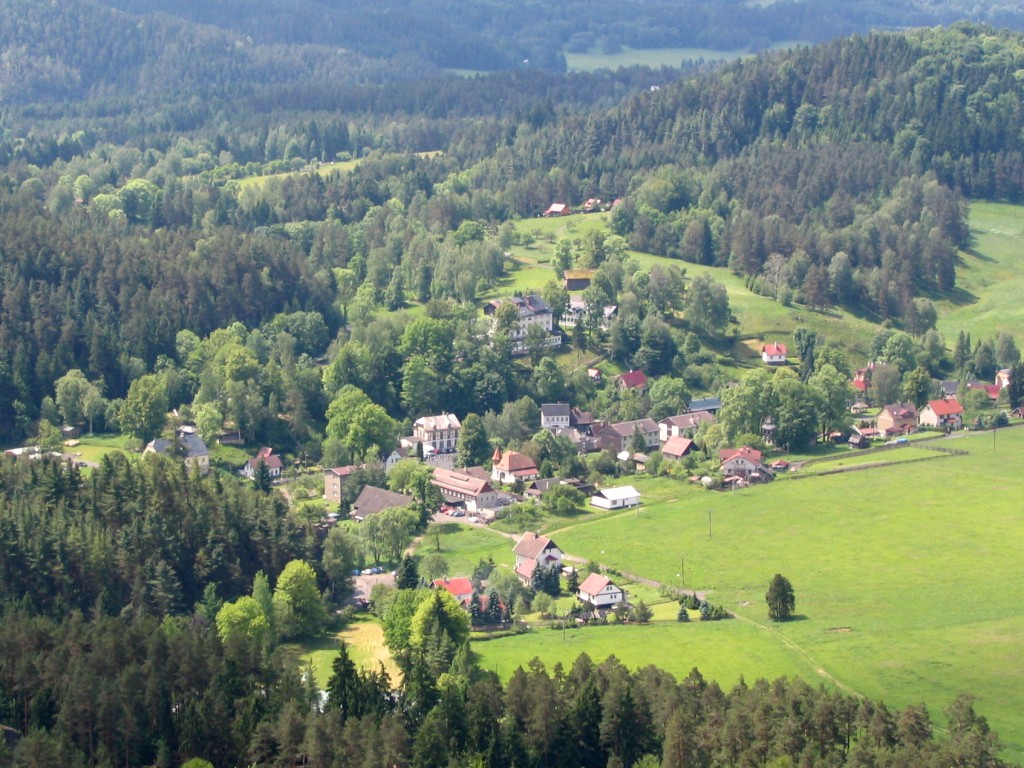
- General view

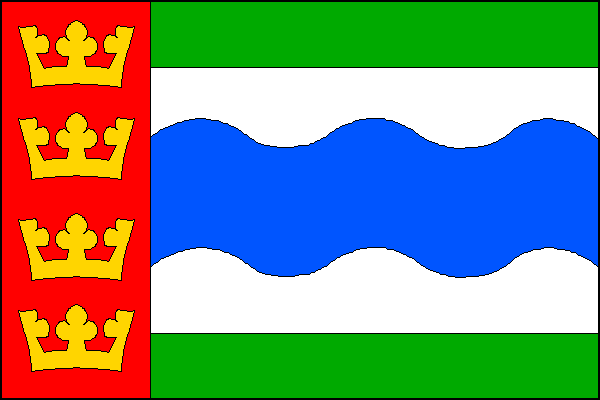
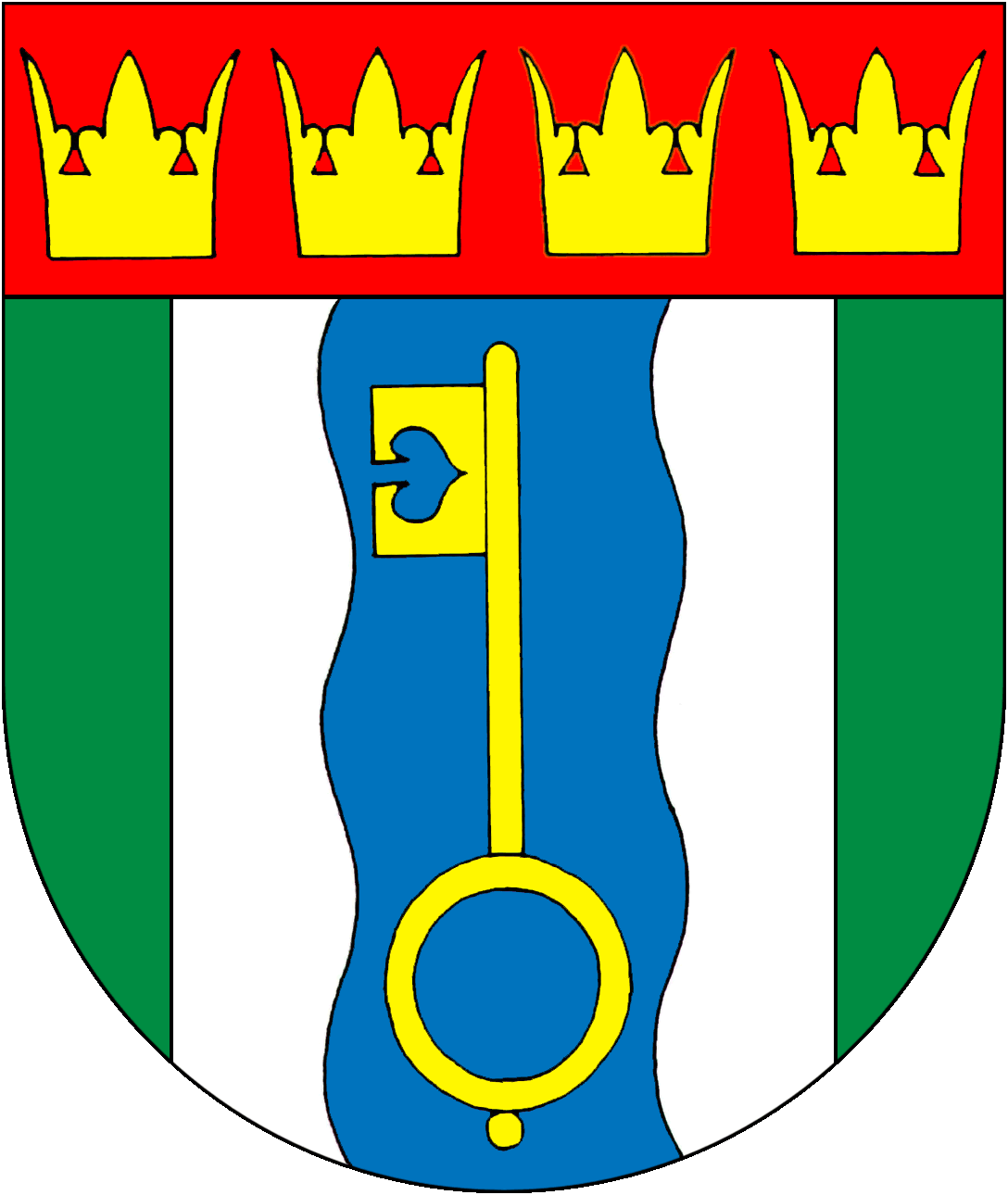
- Flag Coat of arms

- Location in the Czech Republic
- Coordinates: 50°51′9″N 14°23′38″E
- Country: Czech Republic
- Region: Ústí nad Labem
- District: Děčín
- First mentioned: 1457

Area
  - Total: 44.22 km^{2} (17.07 sq mi)
- Elevation: 234 m (768 ft)

Population (2026-01-01)
  - Total: 384
  - Density: 8.68/km^{2} (22.5/sq mi)
- Time zone: UTC+1 (CET)
  - Summer (DST): UTC+2 (CEST)
- Postal codes: 405 02, 407 16
- Website: www.obec-jetrichovice.cz

Jetřichovice (German: Dittersbach) is a municipality and village in Děčín District in the Ústí nad Labem Region of the Czech Republic. It has about 400 inhabitants. The folk architecture in the village of Vysoká Lípa within the municipality is well preserved and is protected as a village monument zone.

Jetřichovice lies approximately 19 kilometres (12 mi) north-east of Děčín, 35 km (22 mi) north-east of Ústí nad Labem, and 88 km (55 mi) north of Prague.

== Administrative division ==
Jetřichovice consists of four municipal parts (in brackets population according to the 2021 census):

- Jetřichovice (147)
- Rynartice (42)
- Všemily (73)
- Vysoká Lípa (110)

== Demographics ==
Historical population
Year	Pop.	±%
1869	2,163	—
1880	2,078	−3.9%
1890	1,969	−5.2%
1900	1,802	−8.5%
1910	1,669	−7.4%
1921	1,420	−14.9%
1930	1,490	+4.9%
1950	610	−59.1%
1961	485	−20.5%
1970	447	−7.8%
1980	355	−20.6%
1991	306	−13.8%
2001	374	+22.2%
2011	376	+0.5%
2021	372	−1.1%
Source: Censuses

== Gallery ==
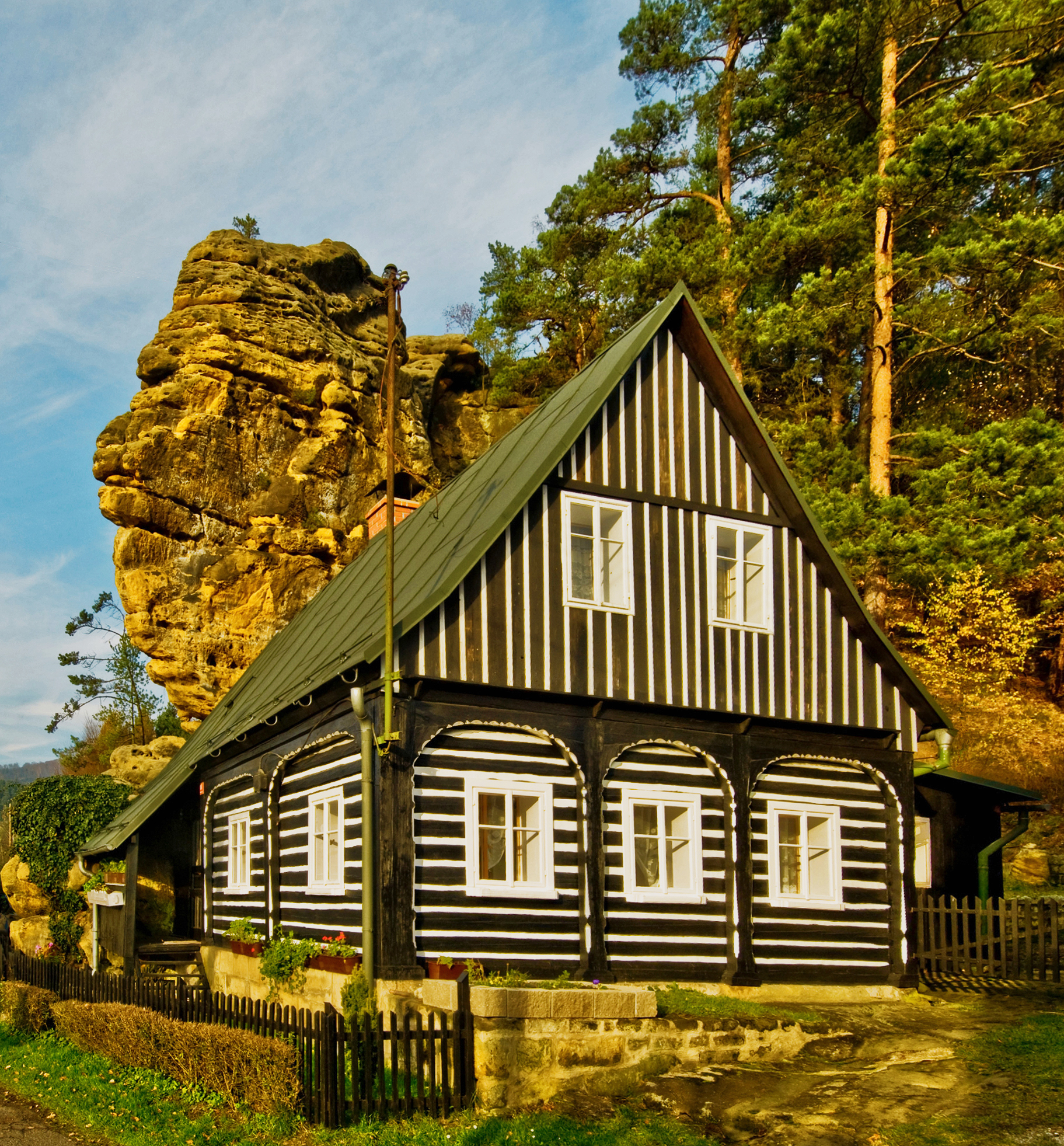
Upper Lusatian house

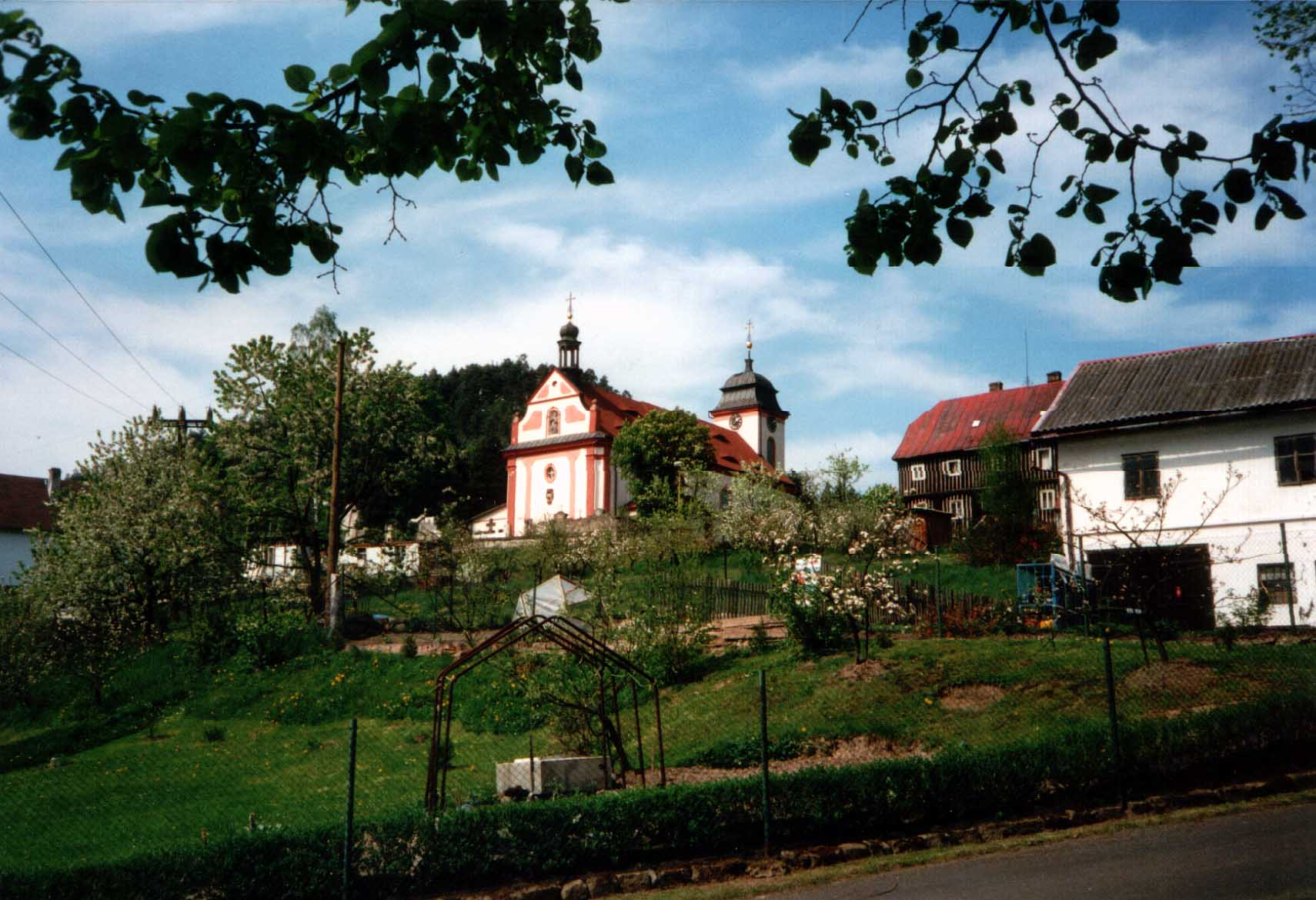
Church of Saint John of Nepomuk

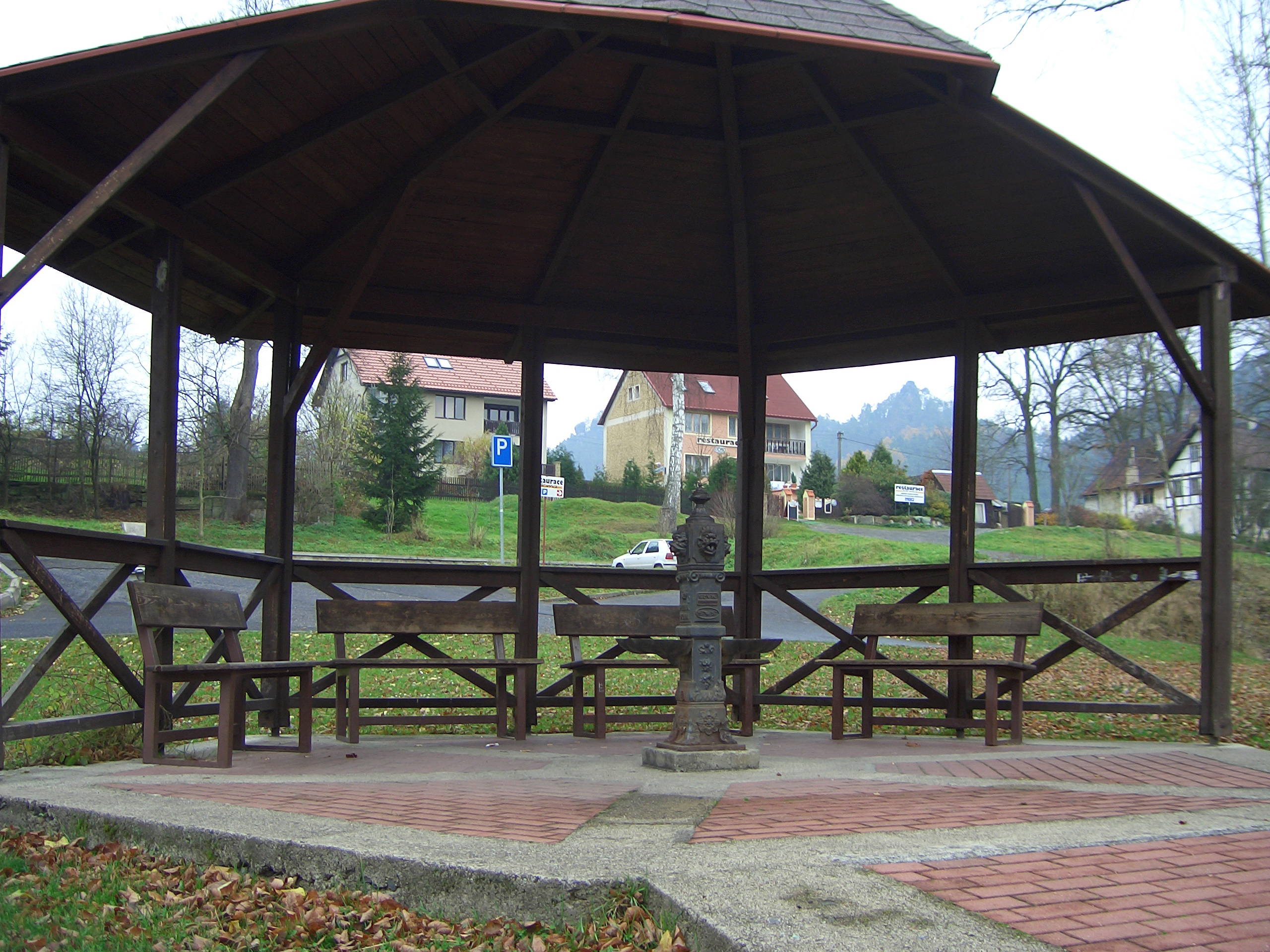
Gazebo near the centre of Jetřichovice
