= Bergtest near Wehlen =

Traditional Sporting Event

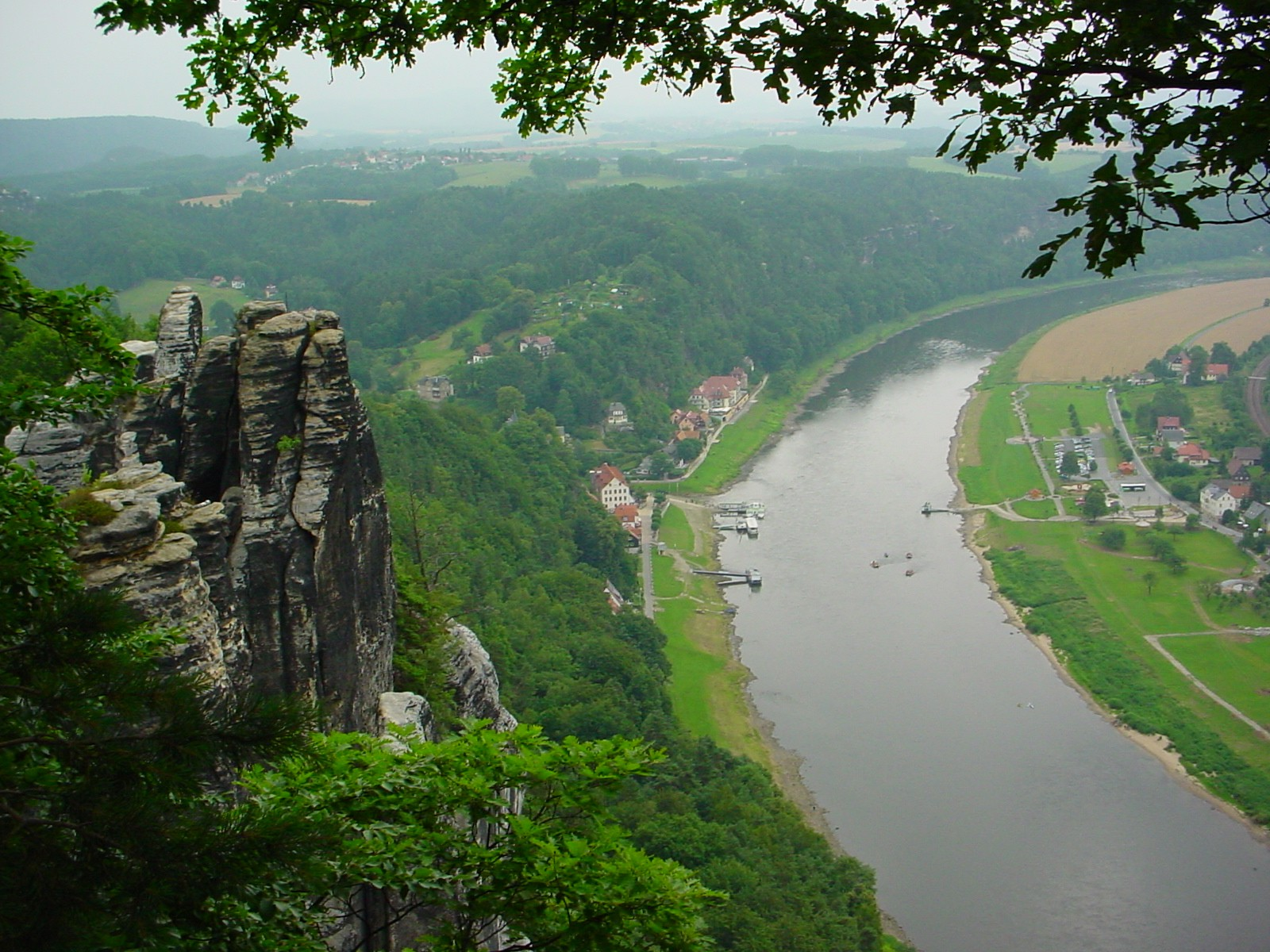
View from the Bastei of the Elbe and spa town of Rathen

The Bergtest near Wehlen (German: Bergtest bei Wehlen, literally "hill test near Wehlen") is a traditional sporting event that has taken place annually since 1980, usually on the last Saturday in March, in the East German hills of Saxon Switzerland.

It is a challenging competition walk, during which a height difference of 1,400 metres has to be climbed. There are routes of various lengths between 10 and 36 kilometres, that pass through places of interest in the Elbe Sandstone Mountains.

The organizers are:

- Dresden Hiking and Mountaineering Club (Dresdner Wanderer- und Bergsteigerverein or DWBV,
- WKF Bergfried 91 and
- White and Green Walking Group (Wandergruppe Weiß-Grün)

Until 1990 there was also the firm, VEB Kombinat Robotron.

== Route ==
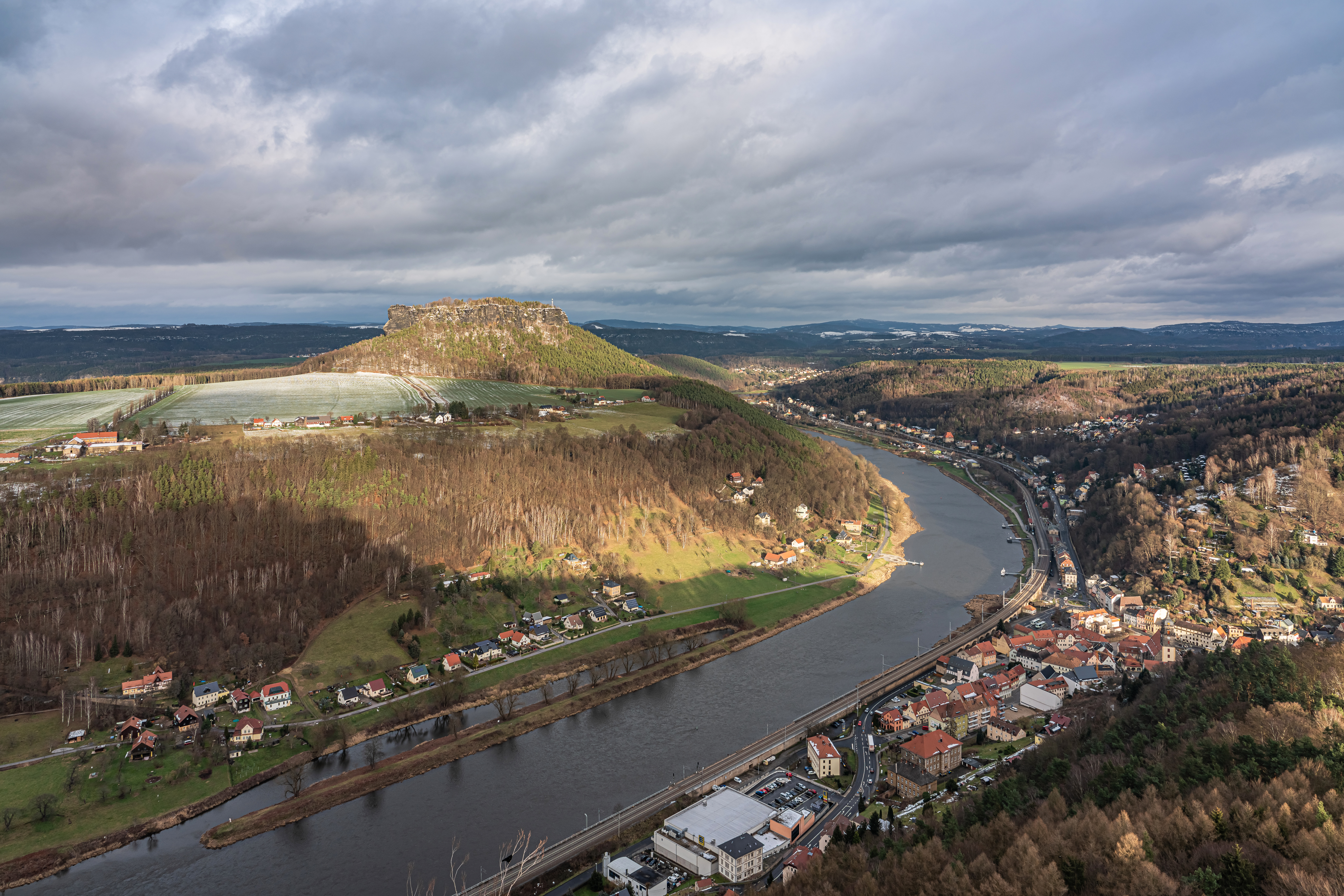
View from Königstein to Lilienstein

- Start at station forecourt in Wehlen,
- Damengrund, Naundorf, Kleiner Bärenstein,
- Thieves' Cave (Diebshöhle) (also:Götzinger Cave), Thürmsdorf,
- Königstein Fortress, Palmschänke, Latz Hut,
- Biela bridge, Quirl,
- Pfaffenstein, Pfaffendorf
- Schöne Aussicht
- Königstein (Saxon Switzerland), ferry,
- Lilienstein,
- Rathen,
- Polenz Valley,
- Hockstein,
- Amselgrund,
- Schwedenlöcher
- Steinerner Tisch and back to Wehlen
