= Polenz =

Polenz may refer to:

- Polenz (river), a river of Saxony, Germany

== People with that surname ==
- Ruprecht Polenz (born 1946), German politician, member of the CDU party
- Jérome Polenz (born 1986), retired German footballer
