= Sächsische Schweiz-Osterzgebirge 4 =

State electoral district of Germany

51: Sächsische Schweiz-Osterzgebirge 4
- Electoral district for the Landtag of Saxony
- Sächsische Schweiz-Osterzgebirge 4 in 2024
- District: Sächsische Schweiz-Osterzgebirge
- Electorate: 42,980 (2024)
- Major settlements: Bad Schandau, Hohnstein, Königstein/Sächs. Schw., Neustadt i. Sa., Sebnitz, Stadt Wehlen, and Stolpen

Current electoral district
- Party: AfD
- Member: Martin Braukmann

Sächsische Schweiz-Osterzgebirge 4 is an electoral constituency (German: Wahlkreis) represented in the Landtag of Saxony. It elects one member via first-past-the-post voting. Under the constituency numbering system, it is designated as constituency 51. It is within the district of Sächsische Schweiz-Osterzgebirge.

== Geography ==
The constituency comprises the towns of Bad Schandau, Hohnstein, Königstein/Sächs. Schw., Neustadt i. Sa., Sebnitz, Stadt Wehlen, and Stolpen, and the municipalities of Dürrröhrsdorf-Dittersbach, Gohrisch, Lohmen, Rathen, Rathmannsdorf, Reinhardtsdorf-Schöna, Rosenthal-Bielatal, and Struppen within the district of Sächsische Schweiz-Osterzgebirge.

There were 42,980 eligible voters in 2024.

== Members ==
Election	Member	Party	%
2014	Andrea Dombois	CDU	46.8
2019	Ivo Teichmann	AfD	36.7
Dec 2022	Ivo Teichmann	BD	36.7
2024	Martin Braukmann	AfD	45.1

== Election results ==
=== 2024 election ===
State election (2024): Sächsische Schweiz-Osterzgebirge 4
Notes:	Blue background denotes the winner of the electorate vote. Pink background denotes a candidate elected from their party list. Yellow background denotes an electorate win by a list member, or other incumbent. A ✓ or ✗ denotes status of any incumbent, win or lose respectively.						
Party	Candidate	Votes	%	±%	Party votes	%	±%
AfD	Martin Braukmann	14,725	45.1	▲8.4	13,511	41.3	▲4.4
CDU	Armin Schuster	10,948	33.6	Steady	10,079	30.8	▼0.7
BSW	Lutz Richter	2,928	9.0		3,564	10.9	
FW	Jens Giebe	807	2.5	▼1.7	623	1.9	▼1.0
SPD	Sören Karsch	792	2.4	▼2.2	1,230	3.8	▼1.9
Greens	Paul Löser	715	2.2	▼2.8	720	2.2	▼2.0
Left	Peter Brettschneider	694	2.1	▼5.7	550	1.7	▼5.8
Freie Sachsen	J. Müller	592	1.8		1,283	3.9	
APT					335	1.0	
FDP	Nora Hohlfeld	234	0.7	▼4.9	216	0.7	▼1.9
BD	✗ Ivo Teichmann	194	0.6		150	0.5	
PARTEI					141	0.4	▼0.5
Values					83	0.3	
dieBasis					81	0.2	
Pirates					51	0.2	
Bündnis C					30	0.1	
ÖDP					25	0.1	
V-Partei3					17	0.1	
BüSo					14	0.0	
Informal votes		361			287		
Total valid votes		32,629			32,703		
Turnout		32,990	76.8	▲5.2			
AfD hold	Majority	3,777	11.5				

=== 2019 election ===
State election (2019): Sächsische Schweiz-Osterzgebirge 4
Notes:	Blue background denotes the winner of the electorate vote. Pink background denotes a candidate elected from their party list. Yellow background denotes an electorate win by a list member, or other incumbent. A ✓ or ✗ denotes status of any incumbent, win or lose respectively.						
Party	Candidate	Votes	%	±%	Party votes	%	±%
AfD	Ivo Teichmann	11,310	36.7	▲26.0	11,417	36.9	▲25.2
CDU	Jens Michel	10,342	33.6	▼9.3	9,753	31.5	▼10.8
Left	Thomas Winkler	2,422	7.9	▼8.1	2,319	7.5	▼7.5
FDP	Christian Kowalow	1,730	5.6	▼0.8	1,521	4.9	▲0.1
Greens	Irina Becker	1,546	5.0	▲1.5	1,312	4.2	▲0.6
SPD	Peter Goebel	1,424	4.6	▼3.7	1,739	5.6	▼3.1
FW	Michael Beleites	1,285	4.2		896	2.9	▲1.4
Independent	Johannes Müller	708	2.3				
APT					493	1.6	▲0.4
NPD					405	1.3	▼8.6
PARTEI					294	1.0	▲0.7
The Blue Party					237	0.8	
Verjüngungsforschung					215	0.7	
Awakening of German Patriots - Central Germany					74	0.2	
Pirates					61	0.2	▼0.4
ÖDP					58	0.2	
Independent	Eckhard Schaar	55	0.2	▼0.2			
PDV					47	0.2	
Humanists					44	0.1	
BüSo					22	0.1	▼0.2
DKP					16	0.1	
Informal votes		535			434		
Total valid votes		30,822			30,923		
Turnout		31,357	69.8	▲15.1			
AfD gain from CDU	Majority	968	3.1				

=== 2014 election ===
State election (2014): Sächsische Schweiz-Osterzgebirge 4
Notes:	Blue background denotes the winner of the electorate vote. Pink background denotes a candidate elected from their party list. Yellow background denotes an electorate win by a list member, or other incumbent. A ✓ or ✗ denotes status of any incumbent, win or lose respectively.						
Party	Candidate	Votes	%	±%	Party votes	%	±%
CDU	Andrea Dombois	10,827	42.9		10,693	42.3	
Left		4,054	16.0		3,806	15.0	
AfD		2,708	10.7		2,904	11.5	
NPD		2,591	10.3		2,517	9.9	
SPD		2,089	8.3		2,213	8.7	
FDP		1,614	6.4		1,213	4.8	
Greens		885	3.5		907	3.6	
FW					379	1.5	
APT					314	1.2	
Pirates		206	0.8		150	0.6	
PARTEI					87	0.3	
BüSo		173	0.7		69	0.3	
Independent	Schaar	113	0.4				
Pro Germany Citizens' Movement					33	0.1	
DSU					22	0.1	
Informal votes		464			417		
Total valid votes		25,260			25,307		
Turnout		25,724	54.7	▼2.7			
CDU win new seat	Majority	6,773	26.9				

== See also ==
- Politics of Saxony
- Landtag of Saxony
