= Schwarzbach (Sebnitz) =

River in Germany

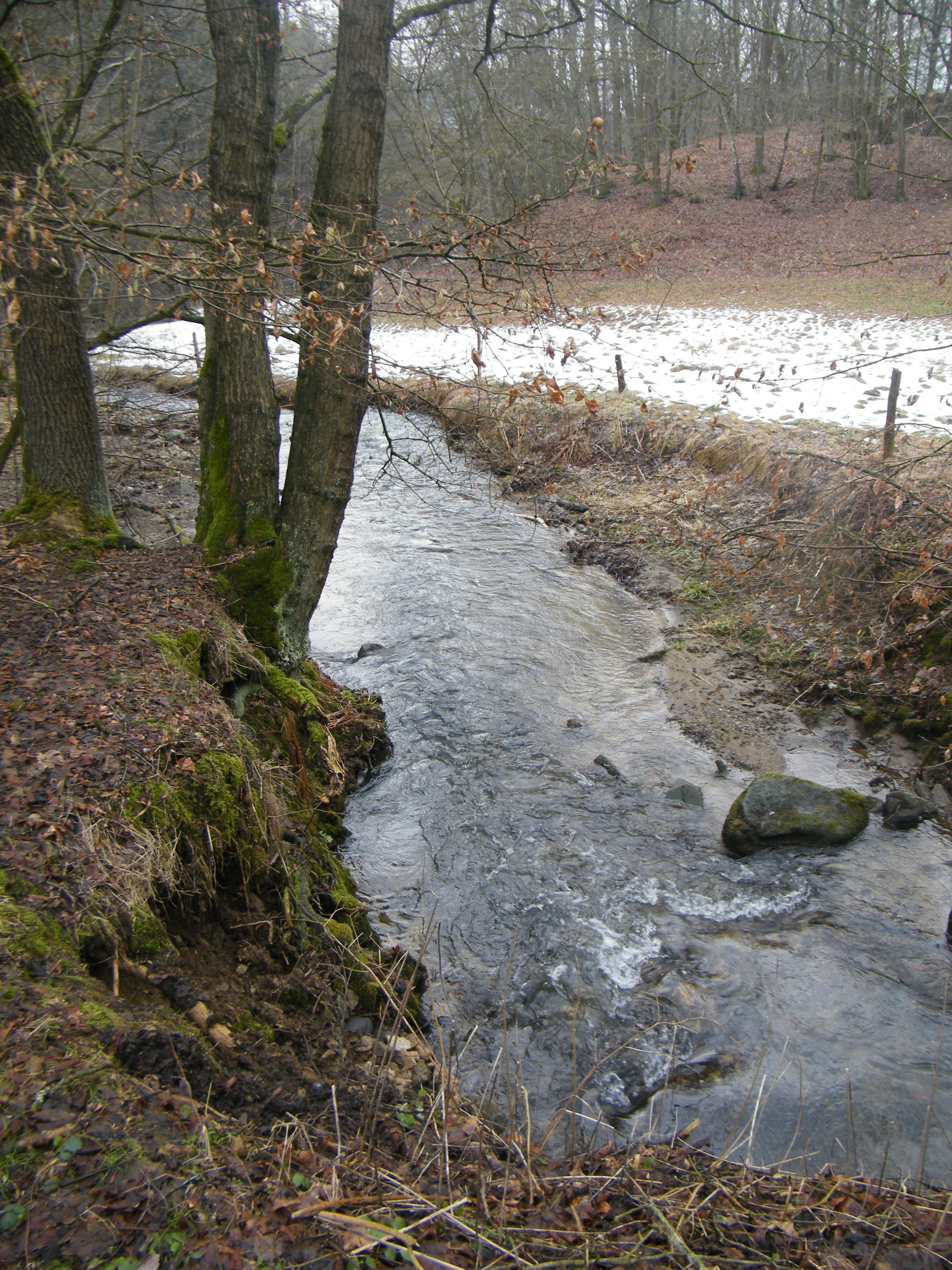

Location
- Country: Germany
- States: Saxony

Physical characteristics
- Source
  - location: Western slope of the Ungerberg (~485 m)
- Mouth
  - location: Sebnitz
  - coordinates: 50.9446°N 14.1846°E
- Length: 10.2 km

Basin features
- Progression: Sebnitz→ Lachsbach→ Elbe→ North Sea

The Schwarzbach (German pronunciation: [ˈʃvaʁtsˌbax]) is a river of Saxony, Germany. It is a right tributary of the Sebnitz, which in turn flows via the Lachsbach and the Elbe into the North Sea. The river is about 10.2 km long and runs through the municipalities of Hohnstein and Sebnitz in the Saxon Switzerland region.

== Course ==
The Schwarzbach rises on the western slope of the Ungerberg (~485 m above sea level). Initially it flows about 2 km westward, then turns south near Krumhermsdorf and passes through Lohsdorf. It joins the Sebnitz south of Mittelndorf, near the site of the former Buttermilchmühle. At its confluence stands the ruin of Schwarzberg Castle (locally called the "Goßdorf Robber Castle").

== Geography and Nature ==
The river mostly flows through the natural region of the West Lusatian Hills and Uplands.

- In its upper course it forms a flat valley (20–40 m deep) with meadow areas used as grassland.
- Below Lohsdorf it cuts a deeply incised gorge (Kerbtal) in Lusatian granite, with steep forested slopes over 100 m high and pronounced meanders.
- The valley meadows host diverse plant species such as cowslips, ostrich fern, hare's-tail cottongrass and Parnassia palustris (grass-of-Parnassus).
- Typical fish species include brown trout, stone loach, minnow and gudgeon.

== Conservation ==
The headwaters lie within the Natura 2000 protected area "Laubwälder am Unger" (FFH site 164). The lower course is part of the FFH site "Lachsbach and Sebnitz valleys" (FFH 166) and the Saxon Switzerland Landscape Protection Area (D24). Three areas are designated as natural monuments (Flächennaturdenkmale): Maulberg (SSZ 098), Schwarzberg (SSZ 107), and Nasenberg (SSZ 097).

== Transport and Infrastructure ==
Historically, the lower valley section was traversed by the "Alte Schandauer Straße," a trade route connecting the Hohnstein area to the Elbe valley near Bad Schandau. Today, hiking trails lead from Krumhermsdorf to the valley, and the state road S 165 runs through Lohsdorf.

The narrow-gauge Schwarzbach Railway (Goßdorf-Kohlmühle–Hohnstein) operated from 1897 to 1951 with a 750 mm gauge and included two tunnels south of Lohsdorf. The disused trackbed remains partly preserved and is now a hiking trail. Since 1995, the Schwarzbachbahn e.V. association has operated a museum railway in Lohsdorf, with plans to extend towards Ehrenberg by 2026. Complete reopening between Goßdorf-Kohlmühle and Lohsdorf has so far been denied for environmental reasons.

== Schwarzberg Castle ==
Schwarzberg Castle (locally "Goßdorf Robber Castle") stands ~50 m above the mouth of the Schwarzbach at ~210 m elevation on a rocky spur. First mentioned in 1372 as "Swarczberg," it was built to secure a trade route between the Elbe valley and Upper Lusatia. It belonged to the Berka of Dubá lords in Hohnstein and was later associated with legends of robbery (1475).

In 1858 a romantic ruin with a round tower was added for aesthetic purposes. Remnants of medieval walls (up to 2 m thick) and 19th-century additions are still visible. The site is also designated as a natural monument, preserving its old-growth mixed forest.

== See also ==
- Sebnitz (river)
- Schwarzbach Railway
- Elbe

== See also ==
- List of rivers of Saxony
