= Sebnitz (river) =

River in Germany

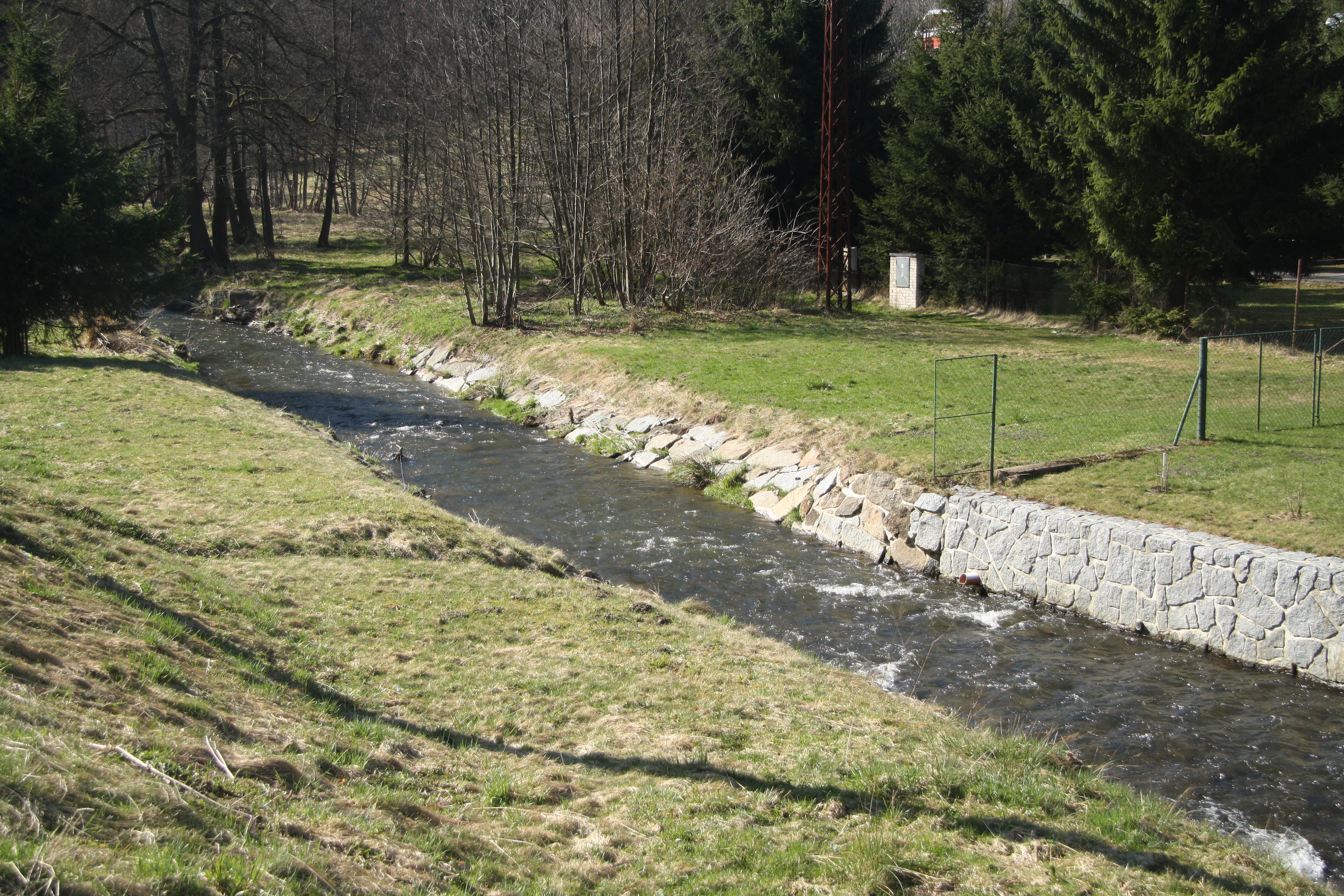

Location
- Countries: Czech Republic; Germany
- Region: Ústí nad Labem
- State: Saxony

Physical characteristics
- Source
  - location: 2 km northwest of the village of Brtníky, Czech Republic
- Mouth
  - location: Confluence: near Porschdorf with the Polenz to become the Lachsbach
  - coordinates: 50°56′35″N 14°08′06″E
- Length: 30.8 km (19.1 mi)
- Basin size: 162 km^{2} (63 sq mi)
- Discharge
  - average: 1.9 m^{3}/s (67 cu ft/s)

Basin features
- Progression: Lachsbach→ Elbe→ North Sea
- Landmarks: Large towns: Sebnitz

The Sebnitz (German pronunciation: [ˈzeːbnɪts]; Czech: Sebnice) is the left, larger headstream of the Lachsbach and runs through both the Czech Republic as well as the German state of Saxony. The upper section in the Czech Republic is known as Vilémovský potok in Czech and Wölmsdorfer Bach in German.

== Geography ==
The Sebnitz rises in the Šluknov Hook in a broad valley between the 608-metre-high Hrazený (Pirsken) and the 593-metre-high Plešný (Plissenberg), 2 kilometres northwest of the village of Brtníky (Zeidler). The stream flows in a northwesterly direction to Velký Šenov (Groß Schönau), where it swings southwest and follows the valley of Šenov stream (Czech: Šenovský potok), passing between Vilémov (German: Wölmsdorf) and Mikulášovice.

Below these villages the Wölmsdorfer Bach between the hills of Spálený vrch (Hillebrand, 443 m) and the Wolfstein (392.9 m) near Dolina (Franzthal) the stream forms the border between the Czech Republic and the tip of the Sebnitz Forest that throws a salient into Bohemian territory. From this section it is known as the Sebnitz or Sebnitzbach. After passing the border crossing of Sebnitz-Dolní Poustevna it continues for several hundred metres along the border before flowing through the town of Sebnitz, named after it, as well as the picturesque Sebnitz valley before uniting with the Polenz after 30.8 kilometres (19.1 mi) above Porschdorf to form the Lachsbach. With an average discharge of around 1.9 m^{3}/s (67 cu ft/s) the Sebnitz can actually be considered the upper section of the Lachsbach, because the Polenz carries less water (discharge: ~1.1 m^{3}/s (39 cu ft/s)). The lower part of the Sebnitz valley is largely known for being the route of the Sebnitz Valley Railway with its 7 tunnels.

=== Tributaries ===
The most important tributaries of the Sebnitz are the:

- Šenovský potok (Schönauer Bach), Velký Šenov
- Liščí potok (Hainsbach), unterhalb Velký Šenov
- Mikulášovičky potok (Nixdorfer Bach), Vilémov
- Luční potok (Heimichbach), Dolní Poustevna
- Finkenbach, Hofhainersdorf
- Schönbach, Amtshainersdorf
- Fischbach, below the Ulbersdorf Mill
- Schwarzbach, by the Buttermilch Mill
- Kohlichtgraben, by the Kohl Mill

== Fauna ==
Since 1995 there has been a cross-border project, the Elbe Lachs, which aims to reintroduce salmon to the Elbe and several of its tributaries, including the Sebnitz. This project has been successful and has resulted in salmon living in the Sebnitz again.

== See also ==
- List of rivers of Saxony
- List of rivers of the Czech Republic
