= Wehlen =

Wehlen may refer to:

- Stadt Wehlen, a town in Saxony, Germany
- Wehlen, a stadtteil (quarter) of Bernkastel-Kues, Rhineland-Palatinate, Germany

== People with the surname ==
- Emmy Wehlen (1887–1977), German actress
