= Velký Šenov =

- Municipality
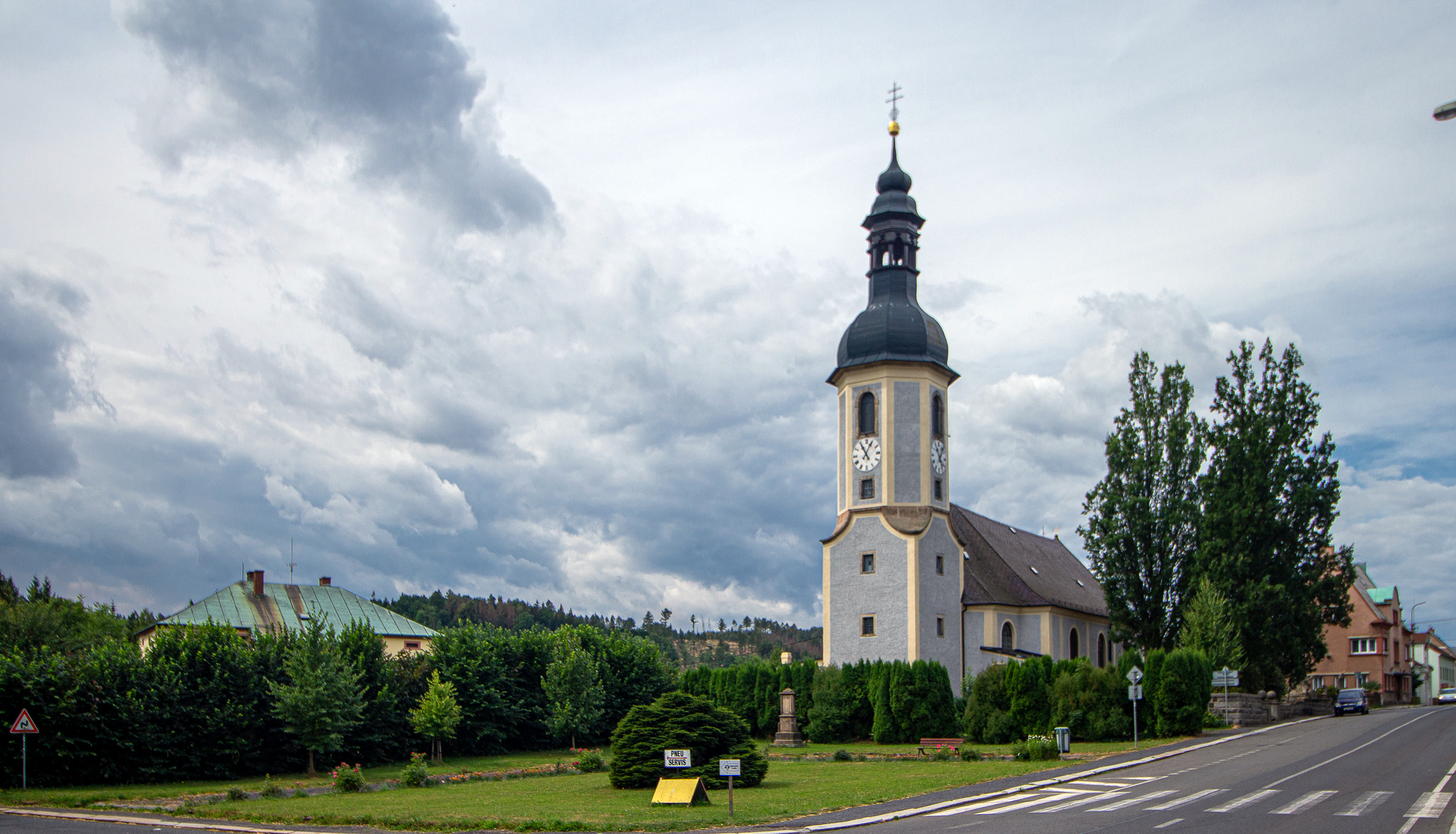
- Church of Saint Bartholomew

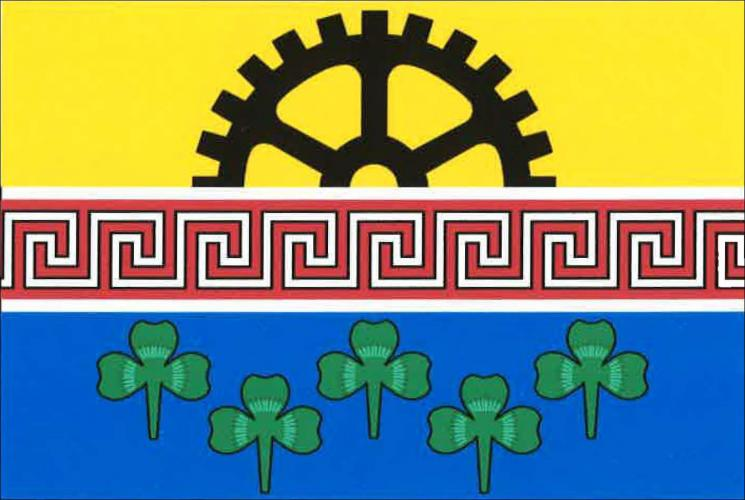
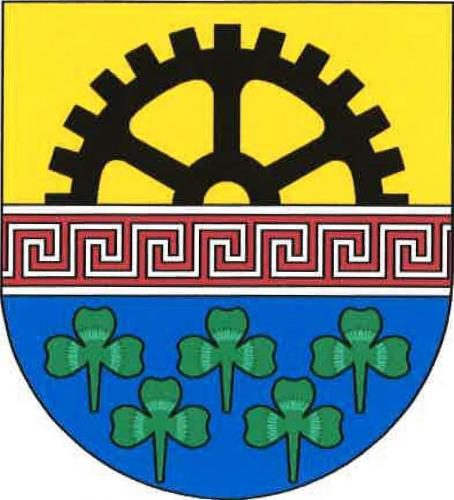
- Flag Coat of arms

- Location in the Czech Republic
- Coordinates: 50°59′27″N 14°22′28″E
- Country: Czech Republic
- Region: Ústí nad Labem
- District: Děčín
- First mentioned: 1404

Government
  - Mayor: Dušan Víta

Area
  - Total: 19.82 km^{2} (7.65 sq mi)
- Elevation: 357 m (1,171 ft)

Population (2026-01-01)
  - Total: 1,996
  - Density: 100.7/km^{2} (260.8/sq mi)
- Time zone: UTC+1 (CET)
  - Summer (DST): UTC+2 (CEST)
- Postal code: 407 78
- Website: www.velkysenov.cz

Velký Šenov (Czech pronunciation: [ˈvɛlkiː ˈʃɛnof]; German: Groß Schönau) is a town in Děčín District in the Ústí nad Labem Region of the Czech Republic. It has about 2,000 inhabitants.

== Administrative division ==
Velký Šenov consists of six municipal parts (in brackets population according to the 2021 census):

- Velký Šenov (1,308)
- Janovka (19)
- Knížecí (15)
- Leopoldka (461)
- Malý Šenov (67)
- Staré Hraběcí (19)

== Etymology ==
The German name Schönau and its Czech transcription Šenov are derived from the German word schön ('nice', 'lovely') and from the Middle High German word ouwe ('floodplain', 'wet meadow').

== Geography ==
Velký Šenov is located about 26 kilometres (16 mi) northeast of Děčín. It is located in the salient region of Šluknov Hook on the border with Germany. It lies in the Lusatian Highlands. The highest point is the mountain Hrazený at 608 m (1,995 ft) above sea level. The Sebnitz River (here called Vilémovský potok) originates in the woods in the southeastern part of the municipal territory and flows through the town proper.

== History ==
The first written mention of Šenov is from 1404. There was a fortress, but it was destroyed during the Hussite Wars in 1430 and was never restored. In addition to agriculture, the main source of livelihood was weaving and linen. At the beginning of the 19th century, the production of ribbons developed in the village. In 1827, a button factory started operating, but at the end of the 19th century the production moved to Lipová.

The importance and number of inhabitants of the village grew and it was therefore promoted to a town in 1907. In 1914, the town was renamed Velký Šenov ('great Šenov').

From 1938 to 1945, Velký Šenov was annexed by Nazi Germany and administered as part of the Reichsgau Sudetenland. After World War II, the German-speaking inhabitants were expelled.

== Demographics ==
Historical population

Year	Pop.	±%
1869	4,015	—
1880	4,193	+4.4%
1890	4,297	+2.5%
1900	4,463	+3.9%
1910	5,024	+12.6%

Year	Pop.	±%
1921	4,326	−13.9%
1930	4,635	+7.1%
1950	2,672	−42.4%
1961	2,586	−3.2%
1970	2,462	−4.8%

Year	Pop.	±%
1980	2,338	−5.0%
1991	1,943	−16.9%
2001	2,014	+3.7%
2011	1,932	−4.1%
2021	1,889	−2.2%

Source: Censuses

== Transport ==
Velký Šenov is located on the local railway line Děčín–Rumburk via Germany. The town is served by three stops.

== Sights ==
The main landmark of the town is the Church of Saint Bartholomew. It is one of the oldest preserved churches in the area. The original medieval church was replaced by the current Renaissance building in the second half of the 16th century, and was modified in the 1780s.

== Twin towns – sister cities ==
Velký Šenov is twinned with:

- Lwówek Śląski, Poland
