= Stadt Wehlen station =

Railway station in Stadt Wehlen, Germany

Stadt Wehlen (Sachs)
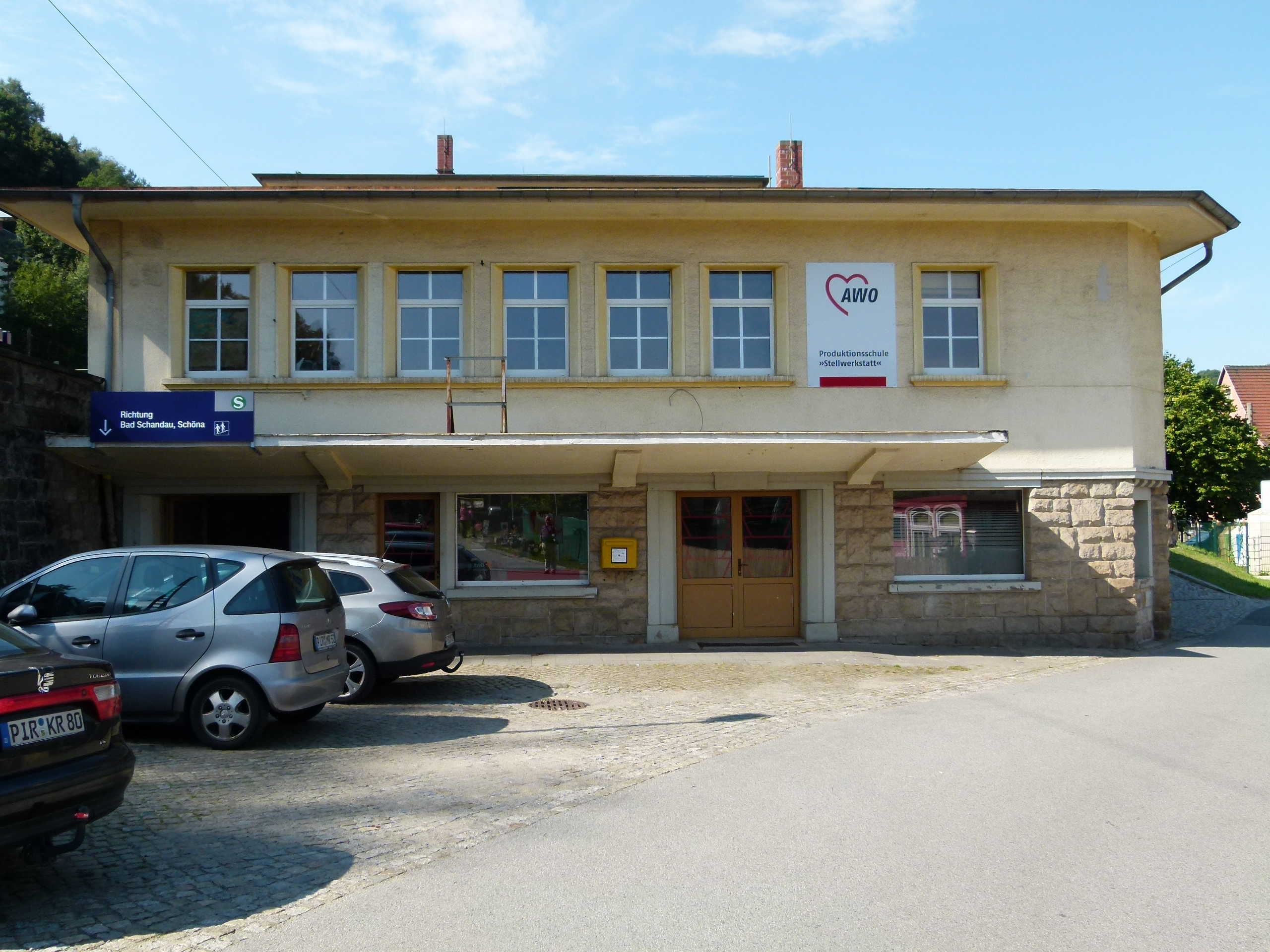

General information
- Location: Germany
- Coordinates: 50°57′13.38″N 14°01′56.04″E
- Line: Děčín hl.n.–Dresden-Neustadt
- Platforms: 2
- Tracks: 2

Other information
- Station code: 5952
- Category: 5

Services
Preceding station	Dresden S-Bahn	Following station
Obervogelgesang towards Meißen Triebischtal	S 1	Kurort Rathen towards Schöna
Location
- Location within Saxony Location within Germany Location within Europe

Stadt Wehlen is a station on the Dresden to Děčín line that serves the town of Stadt Wehlen in the German state of Saxony. The station is located on the south bank of the Elbe and is connected to the town, which lies on the north bank, by the Stadt Wehlen passenger ferry.

The station is served by the Dresden S-Bahn S1 service. Trains run to Pirna, Dresden and Meißen in one direction, and to Bad Schandau and Schöna in the other direction. The service provides two trains per hour in both directions for most of each day.
