= Obervogelgesang station =

Railway station in Obervogelgesang, Germany

Obervogelgesang
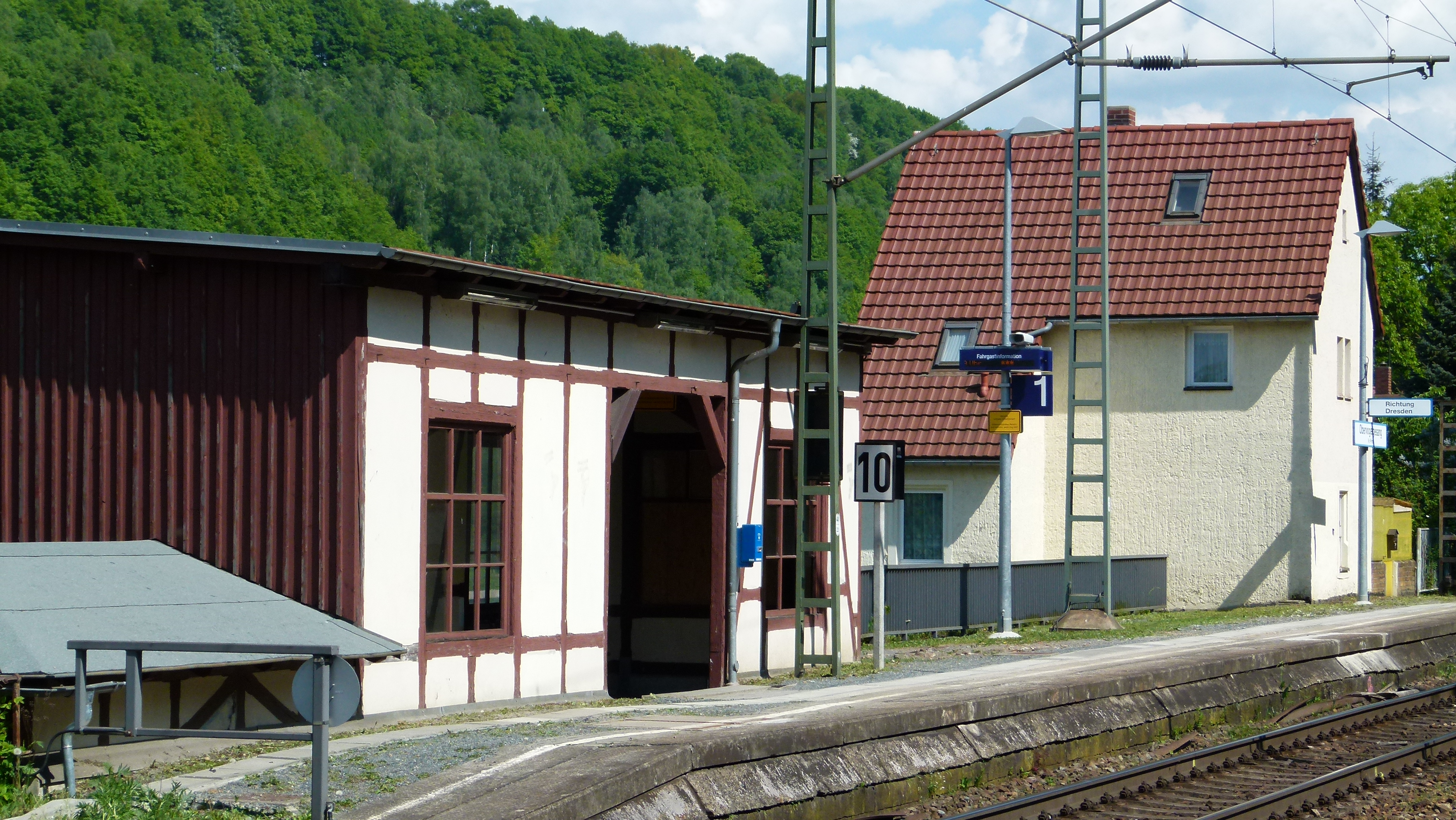

General information
- Location: Germany
- Coordinates: 50°56′59″N 13°59′24″E
- Line: Děčín hl.n.–Dresden-Neustadt
- Platforms: 2
- Tracks: 2

Other information
- Station code: 4705
- Category: 6

Services
Preceding station	Dresden S-Bahn	Following station
Pirna towards Meißen Triebischtal	S 1	Stadt Wehlen towards Schöna
Location
- Location within Saxony Location within Germany Location within Europe

Obervogelgesang is a station on the Dresden to Děčín line that serves Obervogelgesang, a district of the town of Pirna in the German state of Saxony.

The station is served by the Dresden S-Bahn S1 service. Trains run to Pirna, Dresden and Meißen in one direction, and to Bad Schandau and Schöna in the other direction. The service provides two trains per hour in both directions for most of each day.
