= Lachsbach =

River in Germany

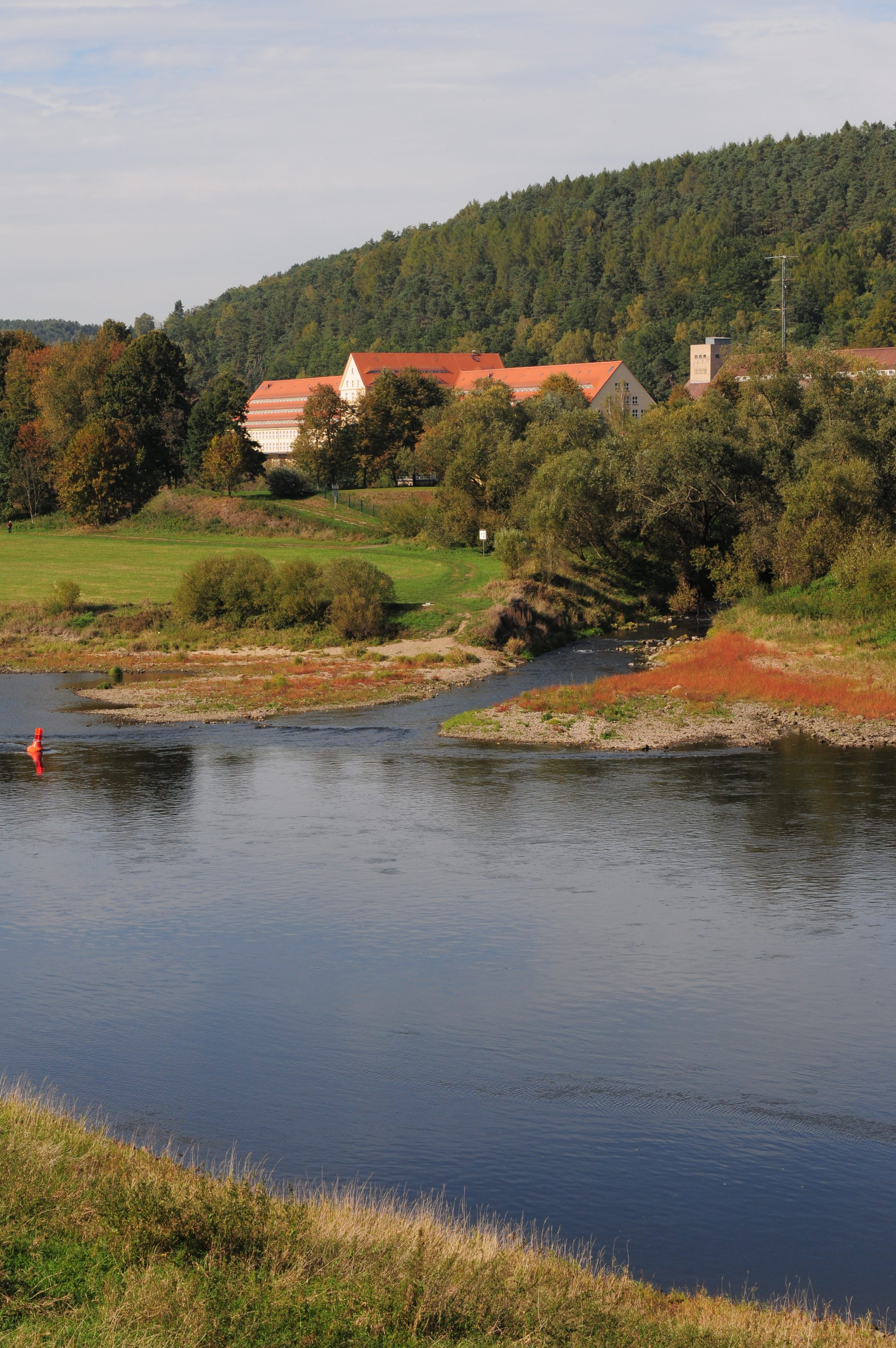

Location
- Country: Germany
- State: Saxony
- Region: Saxon Switzerland

Physical characteristics
- Source
  - location: Start: Confluence of the Sebnitz and the Polenz near Porschdorf
  - coordinates: 50°56′36″N 14°08′06″E
  - elevation: 142 m above sea level (NHN)
- Mouth
  - location: Near Wendischfähre into the Elbe
  - coordinates: 50°55′26″N 14°07′48″E
  - elevation: 127.8 m above sea level (NHN)
- Length: 3.0 km (1.9 mi), with the Polenz 34.3 km (21.3 mi)
- Basin size: 269 km^{2} (104 sq mi)
- Discharge
  - location: at Porschdorf I gauge
  - average: 3.02 m^{3}/s (107 cu ft/s)
  - minimum: Average low: 0.860 m^{3}/s (30.4 cu ft/s)
  - maximum: Average high: 30.8 m^{3}/s (1,090 cu ft/s)

Basin features
- Progression: Elbe→ North Sea

The Lachsbach, also called the Rathmannsdorfer Bach, is a river of Saxony, Germany. It is the largest, right-hand tributary of the Elbe in Saxon Switzerland.

== Geography ==
The Lachsbach is formed by the merger of its headstreams, the Sebnitz (left, about half the size) and Polenz (right, rather longer) in the Elbe Sandstone Mountains near Porschdorf. The combined confluence section of the two rivers was first recorded in 1543б as die beyde wasser ("the two waters"), a description no longer common today. After only 3 kilometres (2 mi), the Lachsbach empties into the Elbe above Prossen's winter port near Wendischfähre.

== See also ==
- List of rivers of Saxony
