= Stadt Wehlen ferry =

Coordinates: 50.95618°N 14.03478°E

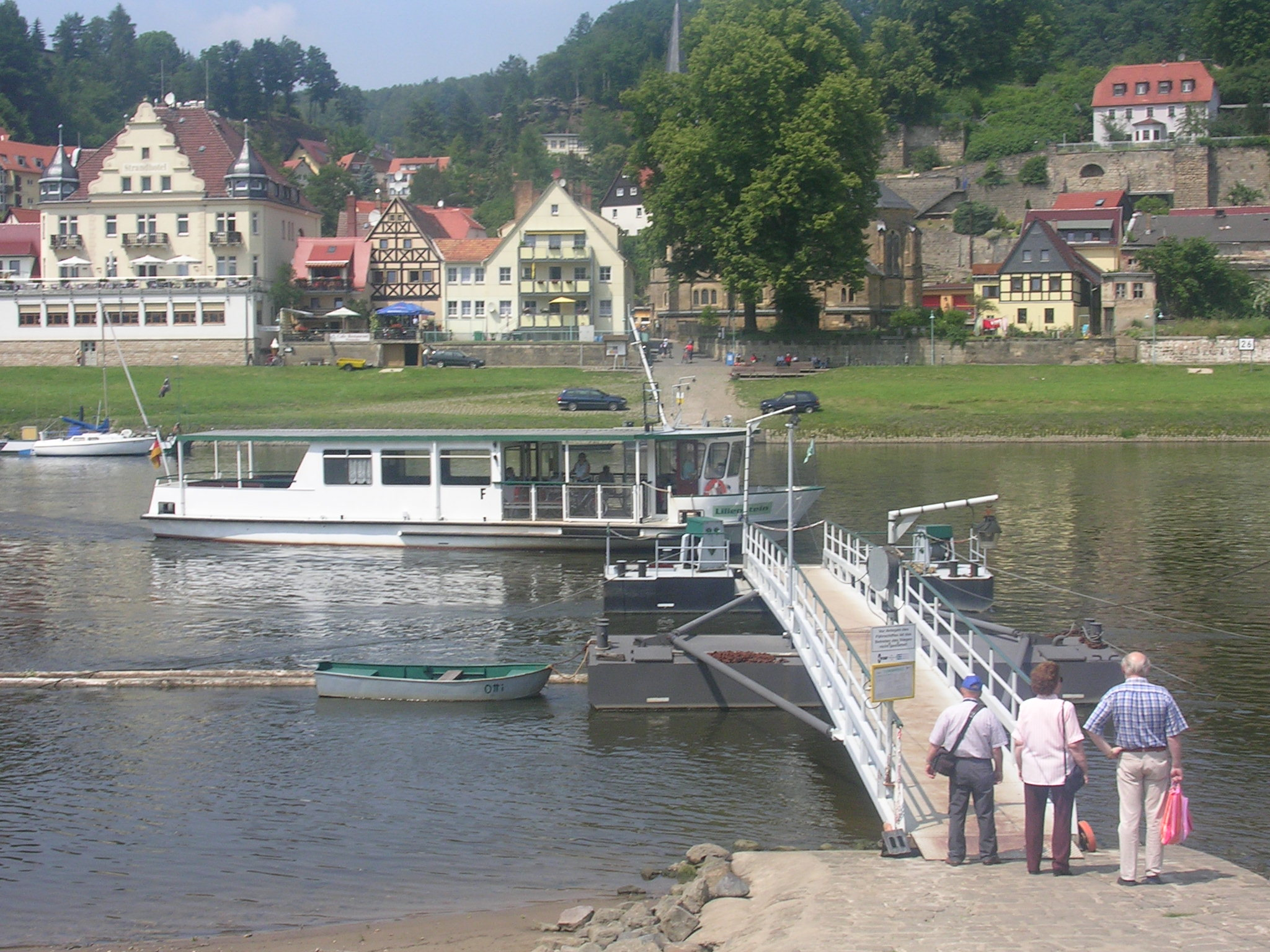
The Stadt Wehlen ferry

The Stadt Wehlen ferry is a passenger ferry across the Elbe river in Germany. The ferry connects the town of Stadt Wehlen, which lies on the northern bank of the Elbe, with the southern bank, where the town's railway station is located. It operates as required throughout the day, with a journey time of around 2 minutes.

The ferry route has been operating since 1771, and celebrated its 250th anniversary in 2021. Today the service is operated by the Regionalverkehr Sächsische Schweiz-Osterzgebirge (RVSOE), who operate a network of buses and ferries in the Saxon Switzerland area.
