= Evelyn Hockstein =

American photographer and photojournalist

- Born: Washington, DC

Evelyn Hockstein is an American photographer and photojournalist. She was the vice president of Women Photographers of Washington. Hockstein has taken shots of former United States President Bill Clinton; in 2002 she traveled to Nairobi, Kenya, on assignment, and has lived and photographed there since.

Hockstein's work has appeared in The New York Times, The New Yorker, Time, Newsweek, Stern, L'Express, U.S. News & World Report and ESPN. She has written about gender parity in the photography field in The Guardian. In August 2017, Hockstein was on assignment for The Washington Post to cover the Unite the Right rally in Charlottesville, Virginia.
