= Polenz (river) =

River in Germany

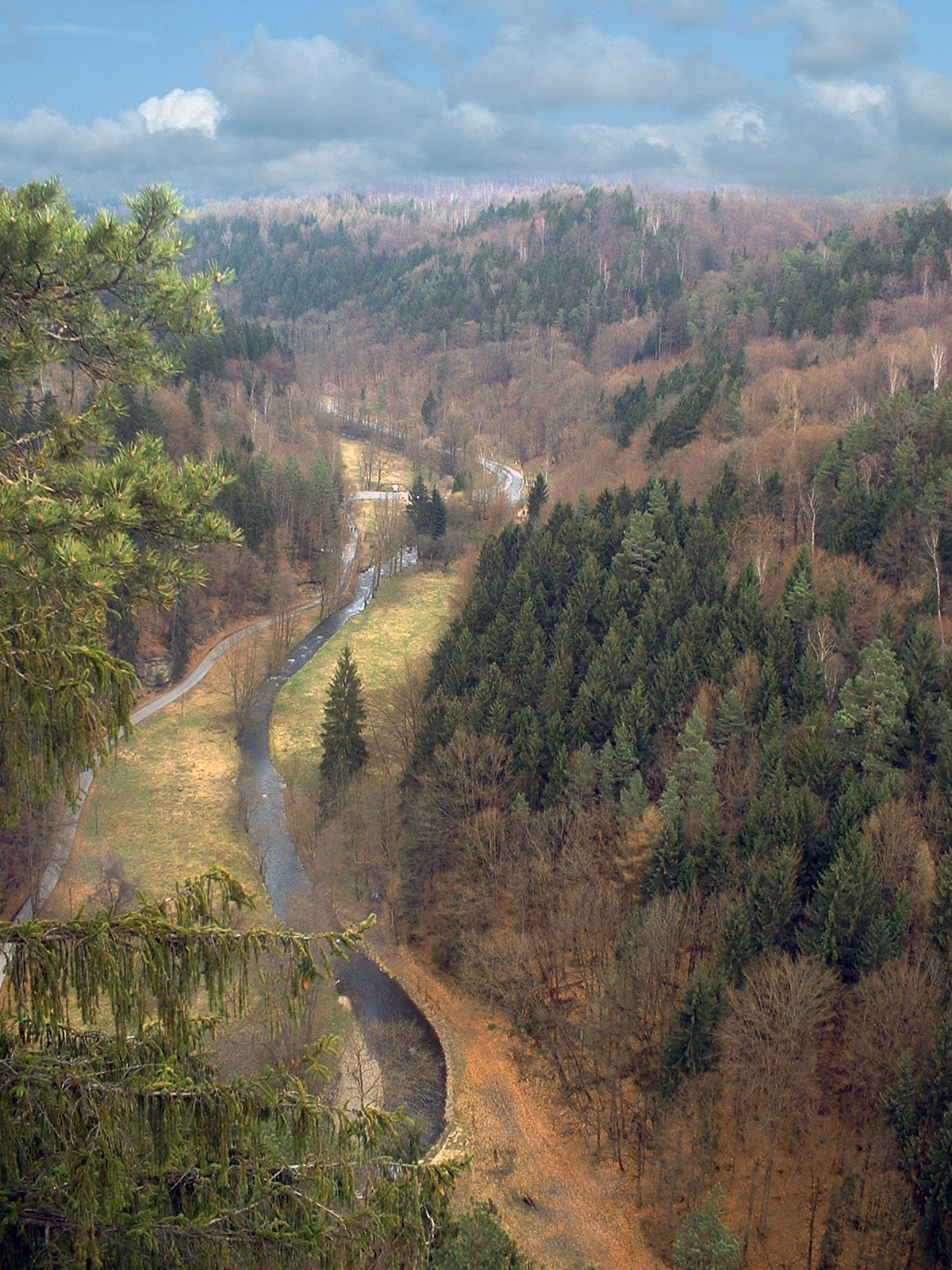
- The Polenz valley immediately above the Lusatian Fault

Location
- Country: Germany
- State: Saxony

Physical characteristics
- Source
  - location: in Saxony
  - elevation: ca. 380 m above sea level (NN)
- Mouth
  - location: confluence with the Sebnitz at Lachsbach near Porschdorf
  - coordinates: 50°56′35″N 14°08′06″E
  - elevation: ca. 150 m above sea level (NN)
- Length: 31.3 km (19.4 mi)
- Basin size: 104 km^{2} (40 sq mi)
- Discharge
  - location
  - average: 1.1 m³/s

Basin features
- Progression: Lachsbach→ Elbe→ North Sea
- Landmarks: Cities: none; Large towns: none; Small towns: Neustadt in Sachsen, Hohnstein
- Navigable: no

The Polenz is the right-hand, smaller headstream of the Lachsbach in the German state of Saxony. Its lower course flows through the western Elbe Sandstone Mountains in a canyon-like valley.

== Geography ==
The Polenz rises from nine springs on the German-Czech border between the villages of Langburkersdorf and Nová Víska (Neudörfel). The springs are located southwest of the 461 m high Roubený (Raupenberg) mainly on German territory and unite at a height of 363 m above sea level. The upper reaches of the Polenz form the natural boundary between the forest land Hohwald and the Saxon Switzerland.

=== Tributaries ===
The most important tributaries of the Polenz are the:

- Laubbach, Langburkersdorf
- Schluckenbach, Neustadt in Sachsen
- Lohbach, Neustadt in Sachsen
- Flemigbach, Polenz
- Rückersdorfer Bach, below Polenz
- Cunnersdorfer Bach, by the Bock Mill
- Goldflüßchen, at the Heeselicht Mill
- Bärenhohlflüßchen, above the Rußig Mill
- Schindergraben, at Hockstein
- Tiefergrundbach, at the Frinzthal Mill

== Spring snowflakes fields ==
Booth riverbanks are protected and included in the Europe wide Natura 2000 network. The riverbank has been used for farming and grazing before 1900. The mowing improved the conditions for the spring snowflakes. The Polenz valley has one of the biggest occurrences of the endangered plant in Germany.

The area is still mowed regularly in summer, so those plants have better conditions.

== See also ==
- List of rivers of Saxony
