= Stadt Wehlen =

- Town
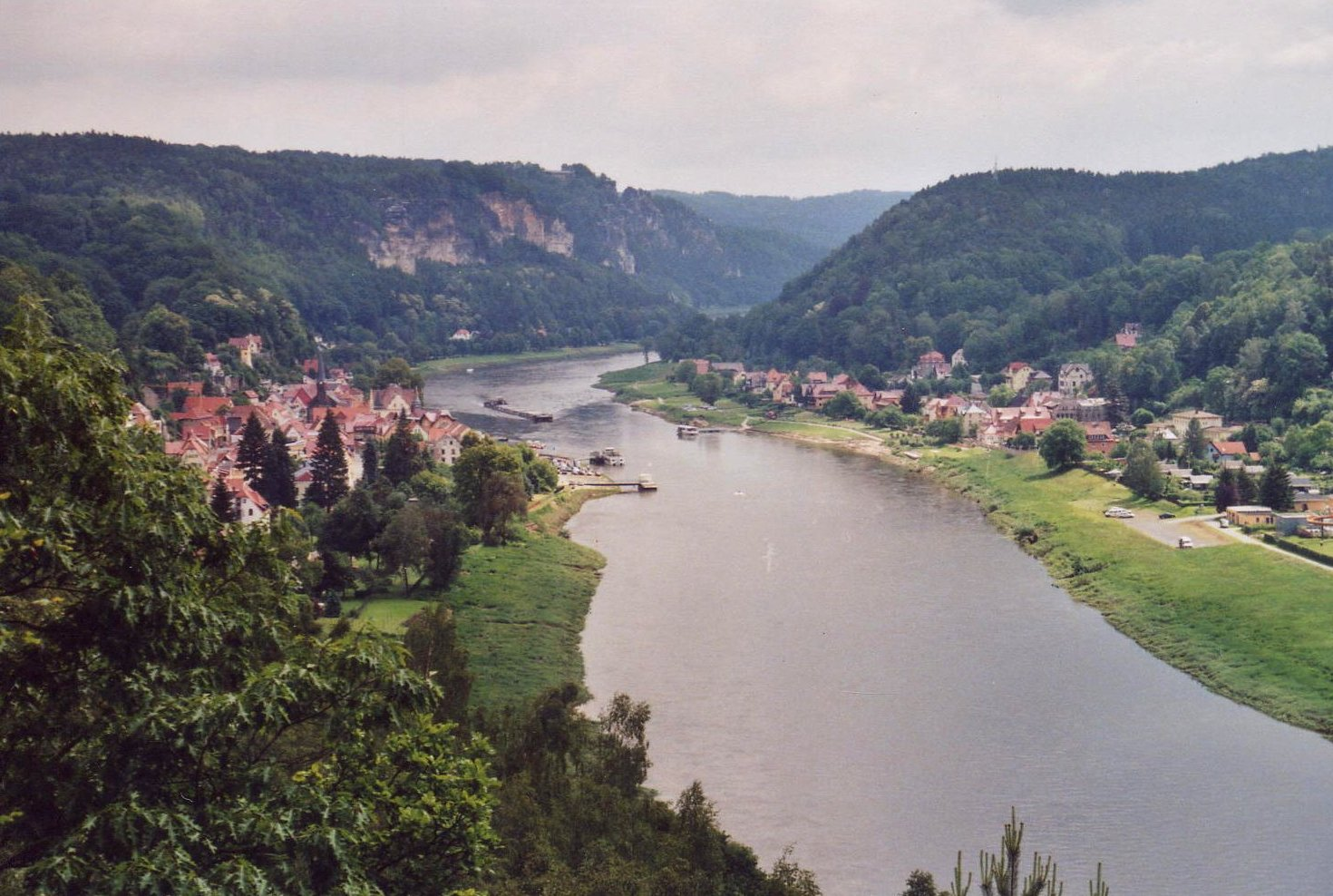

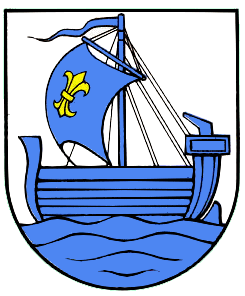
- Coat of arms

- Location of Stadt Wehlen within Sächsische Schweiz-Osterzgebirge district
- Interactive map of Stadt Wehlen
- Location within Germany Location within Saxony
- Coordinates: 50°57′25″N 14°1′56″E
- Country: Germany
- State: Saxony
- District: Sächsische Schweiz-Osterzgebirge
- Subdivisions: 4

Government
  - Mayor (2022–29): Thomas Mathe

Area
  - Total: 10.85 km^{2} (4.19 sq mi)
- Elevation: 220 m (720 ft)

Population (2025-12-31)
  - Total: 1,500
  - Density: 140/km^{2} (360/sq mi)
- Time zone: UTC+01:00 (CET)
  - Summer (DST): UTC+02:00 (CEST)
- Postal codes: 01829
- Dialling codes: 035024
- Vehicle registration: PIR
- Website: www.wehlen-online.de

Stadt Wehlen (German pronunciation: [ʃtat ˈveːlən]) is a town in the Sächsische Schweiz-Osterzgebirge district, in Saxony, Germany. It is situated on the western edge of Saxon Switzerland, on the right bank of the Elbe, 6 km east of Pirna, and 23 km southeast of Dresden (centre).

== Municipality subdivisions ==
Wehlen includes the following subdivisions:

- Dorf Wehlen
- Pötzscha
- Stadt Wehlen
- Zeichen

== Culture and attractions in Wehlen ==
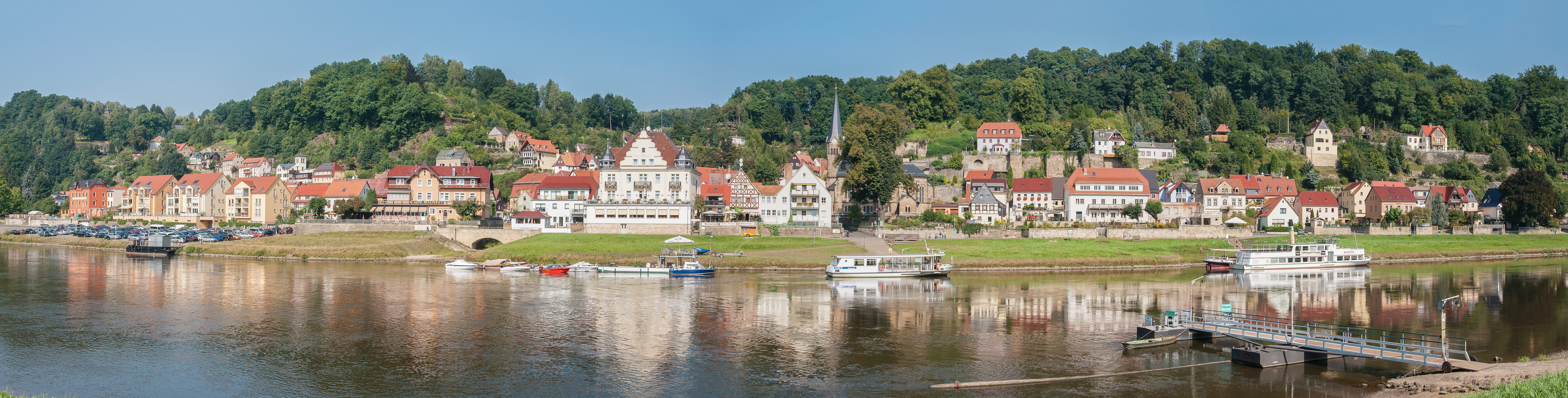
Panorama of Stadt Wehlen
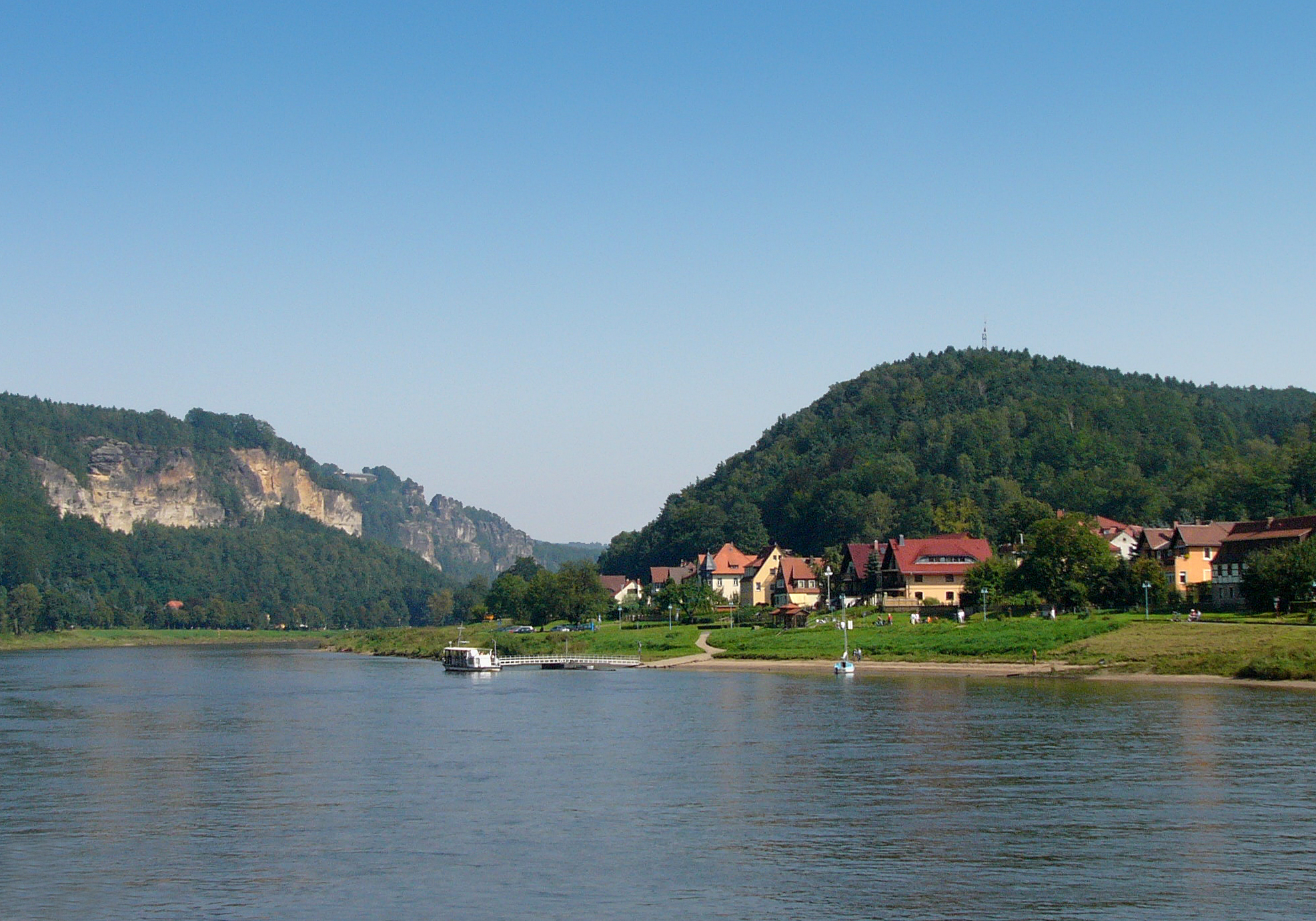
View to the left side of the Elbe onto Wehlen/Pötzscha

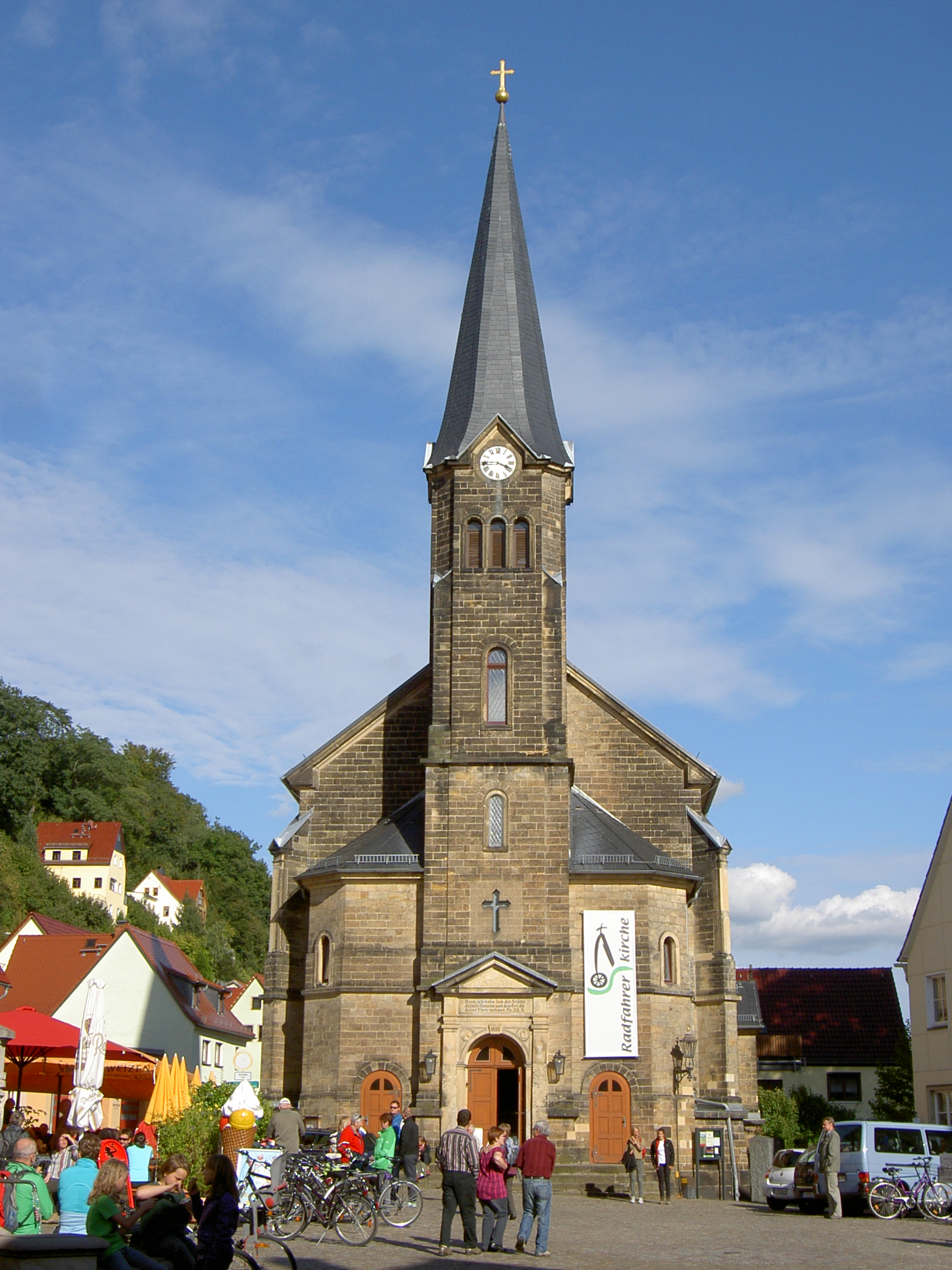
Townchurch at the Marketplace

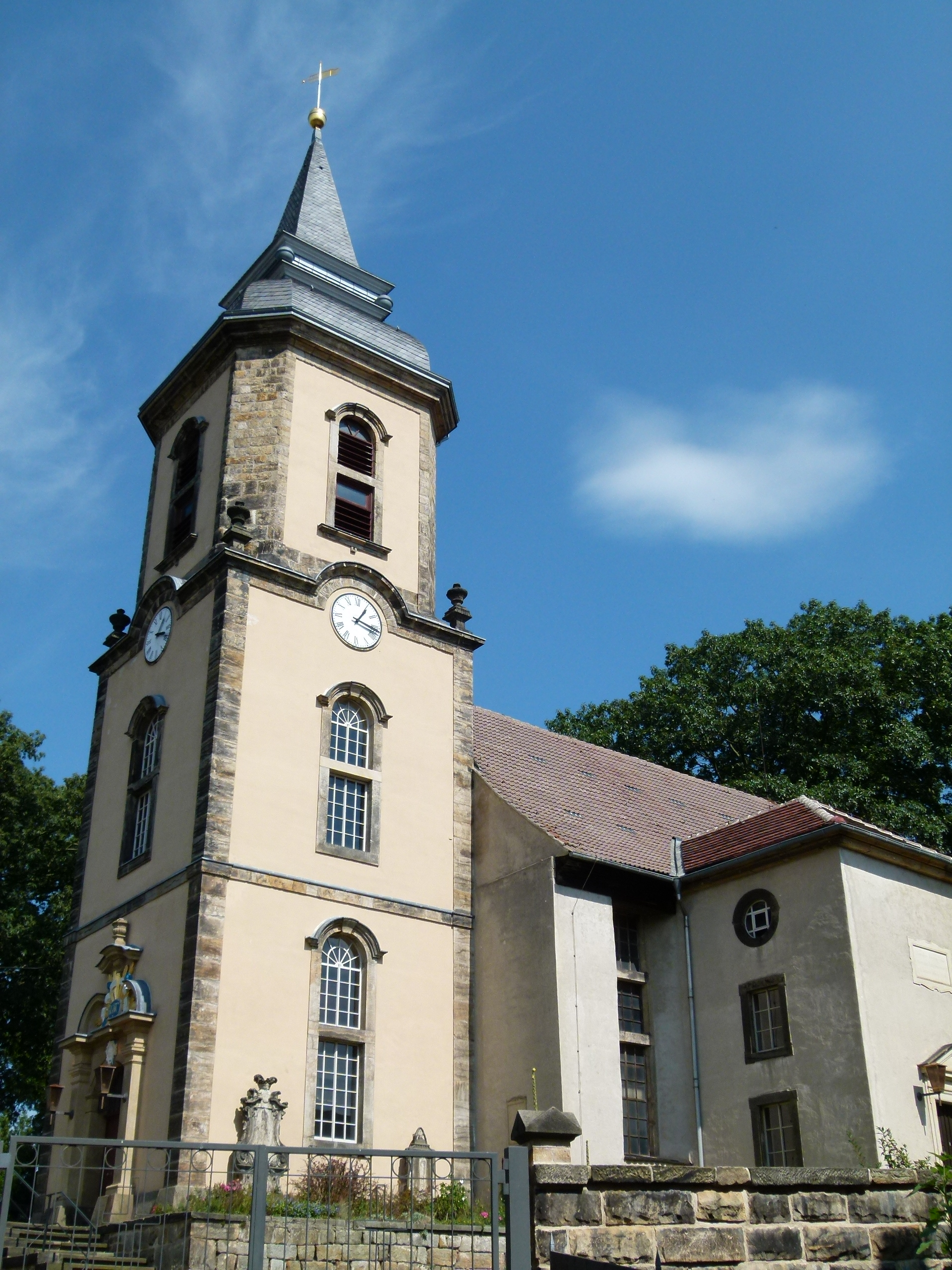
Michalischurch in Dorf Wehlen

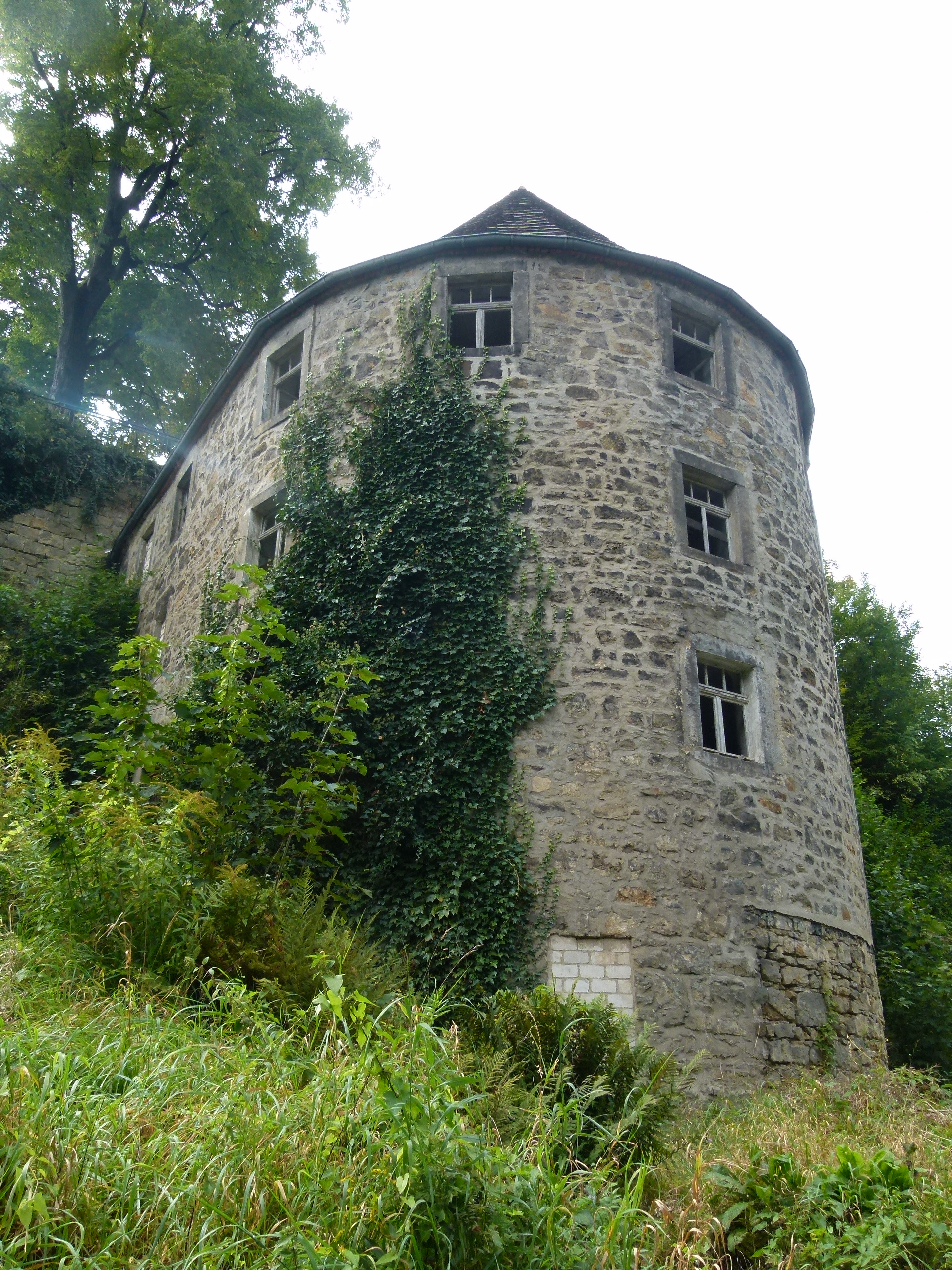
„Trommel“(drum): Northside of castleruin Stadt Wehlen

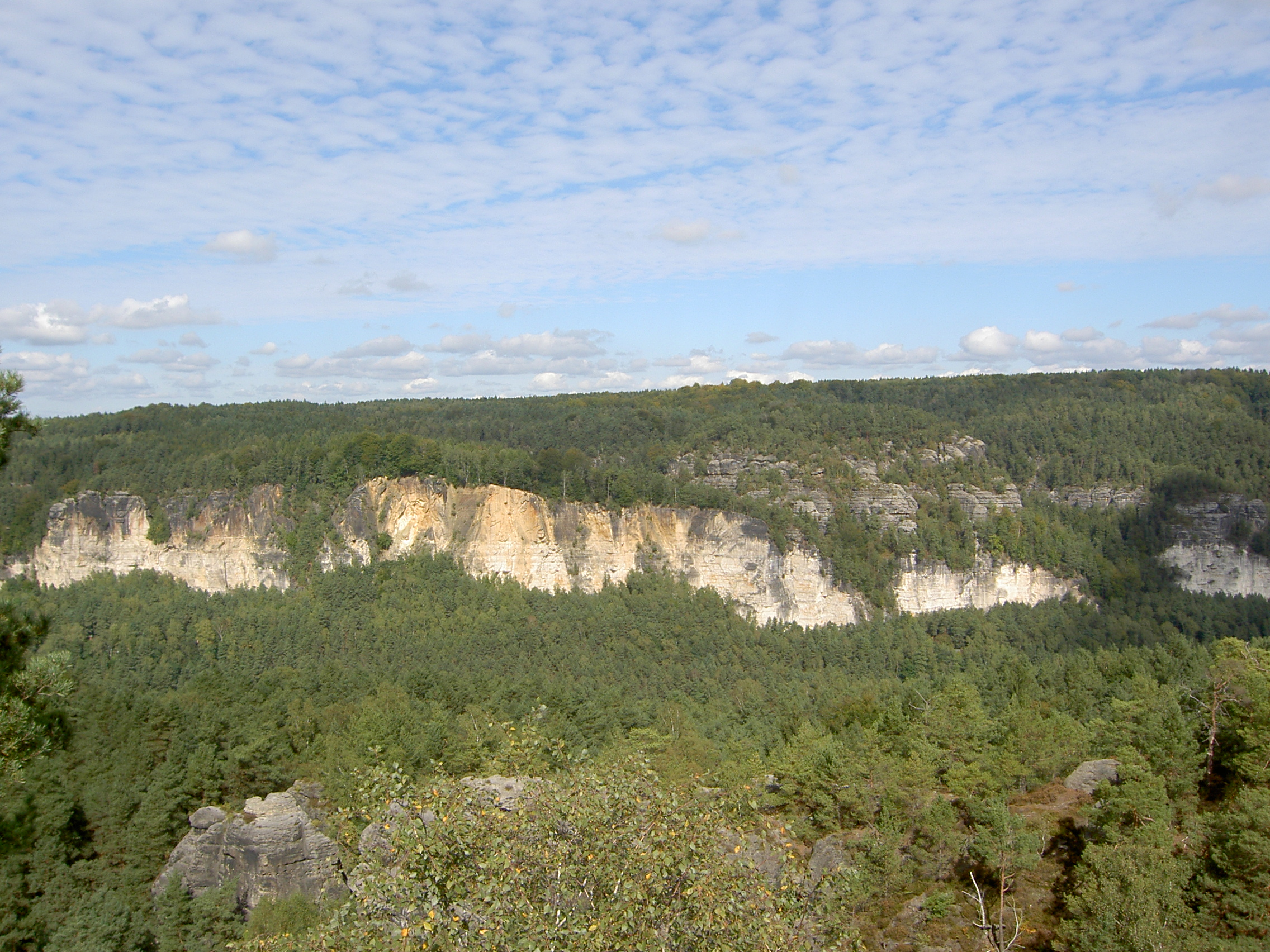
„Weiße Brüche“(white quarries) View from the Raunenstein (mountain)

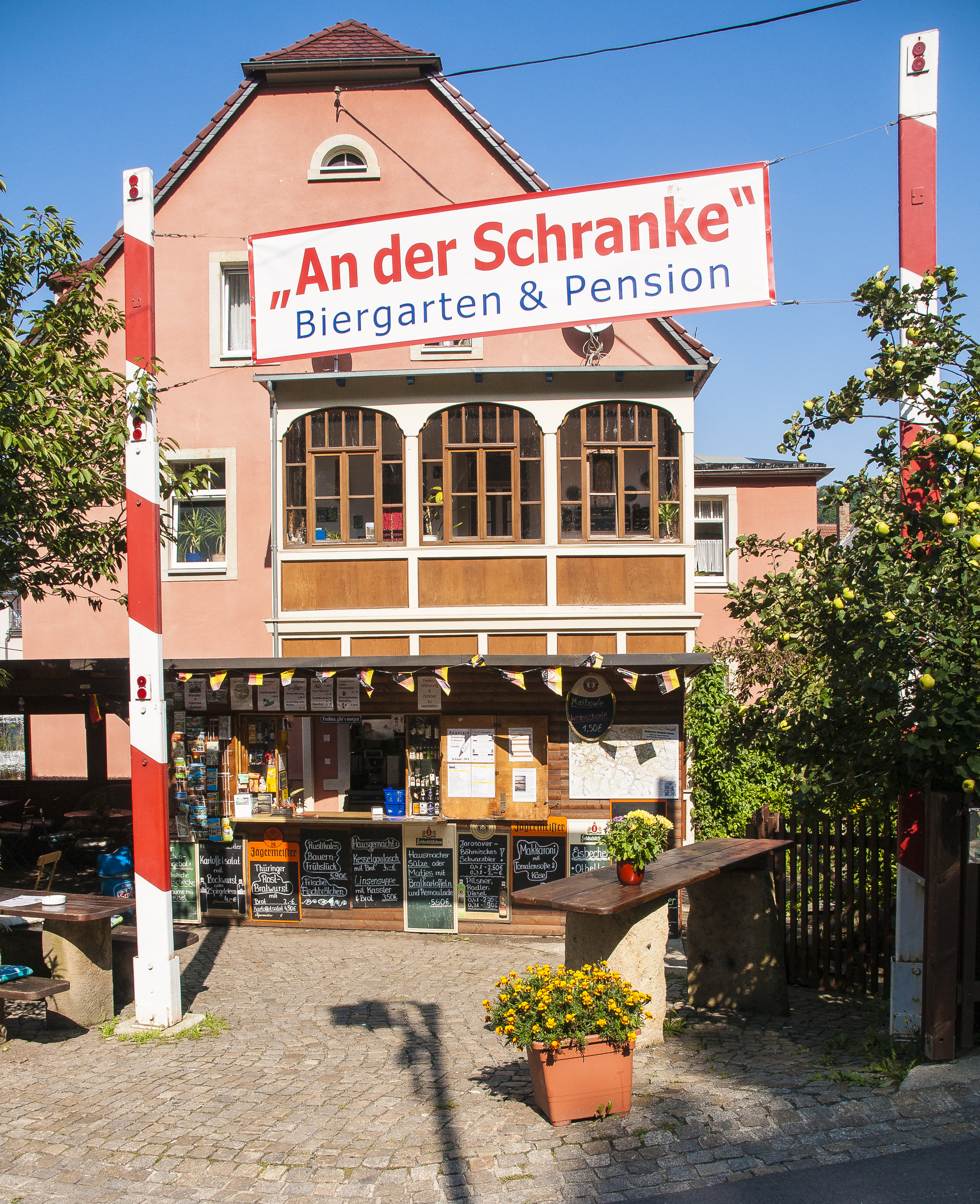
Beergarden in Wehlen/Pötzscha

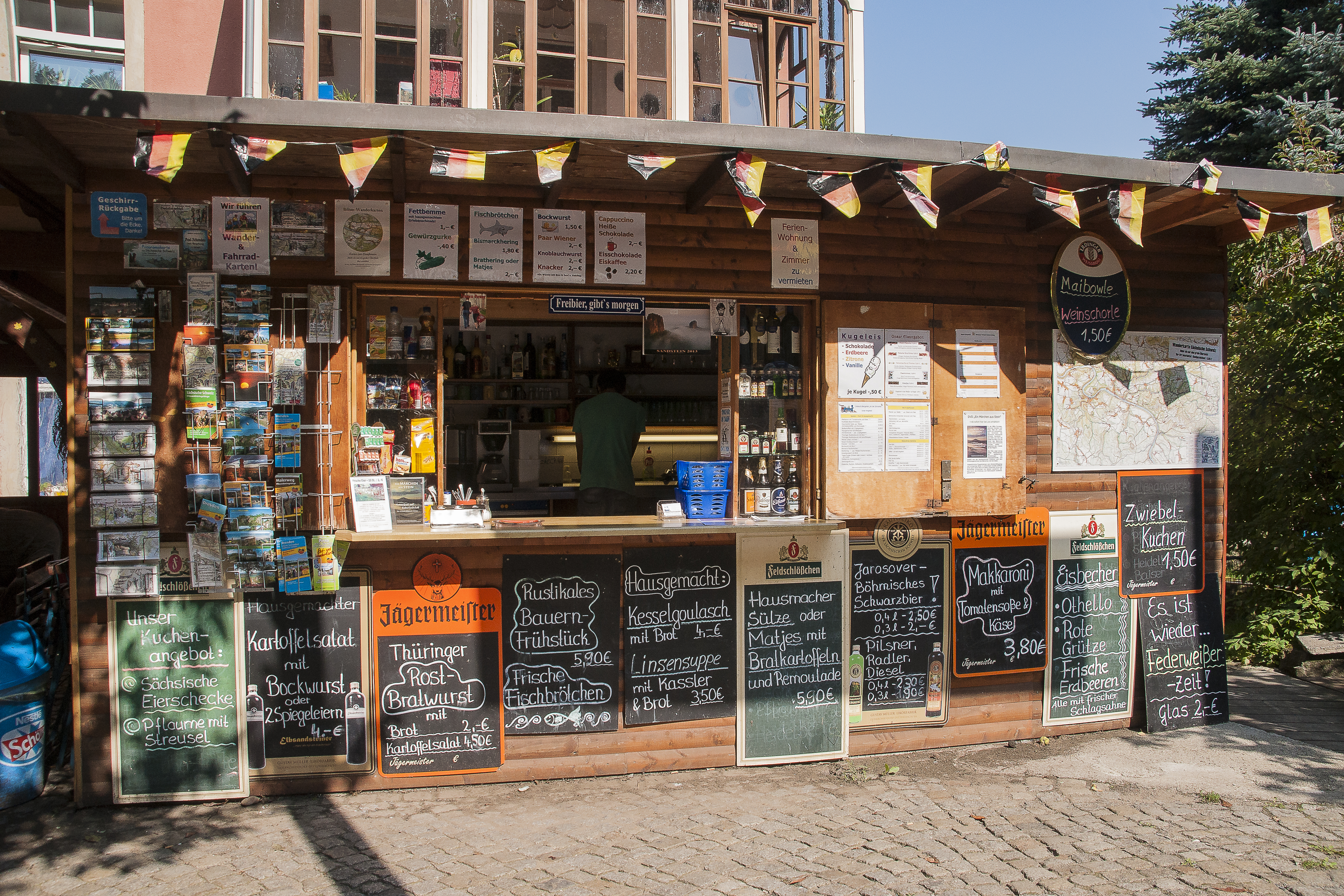
Beergarden in Wehlen/Pötzscha

== Transport ==
Stadt Wehlen station, on the Dresden S-Bahn and the Dresden to Prague railway, is located on the south bank of the Elb and is connected to the town centre, on the north bank, by the frequent Stadt Wehlen passenger ferry. Also on the north bank, an infrequent bus service connects the town to Pirna. Both ferry and bus are operated by the Regionalverkehr Sächsische Schweiz-Osterzgebirge. Königstein is also a stop for the Sächsische Dampfschiffahrt ships, including historic paddle steamers, operating on the Elbe between Dresden and the Czech border.

== International relations ==
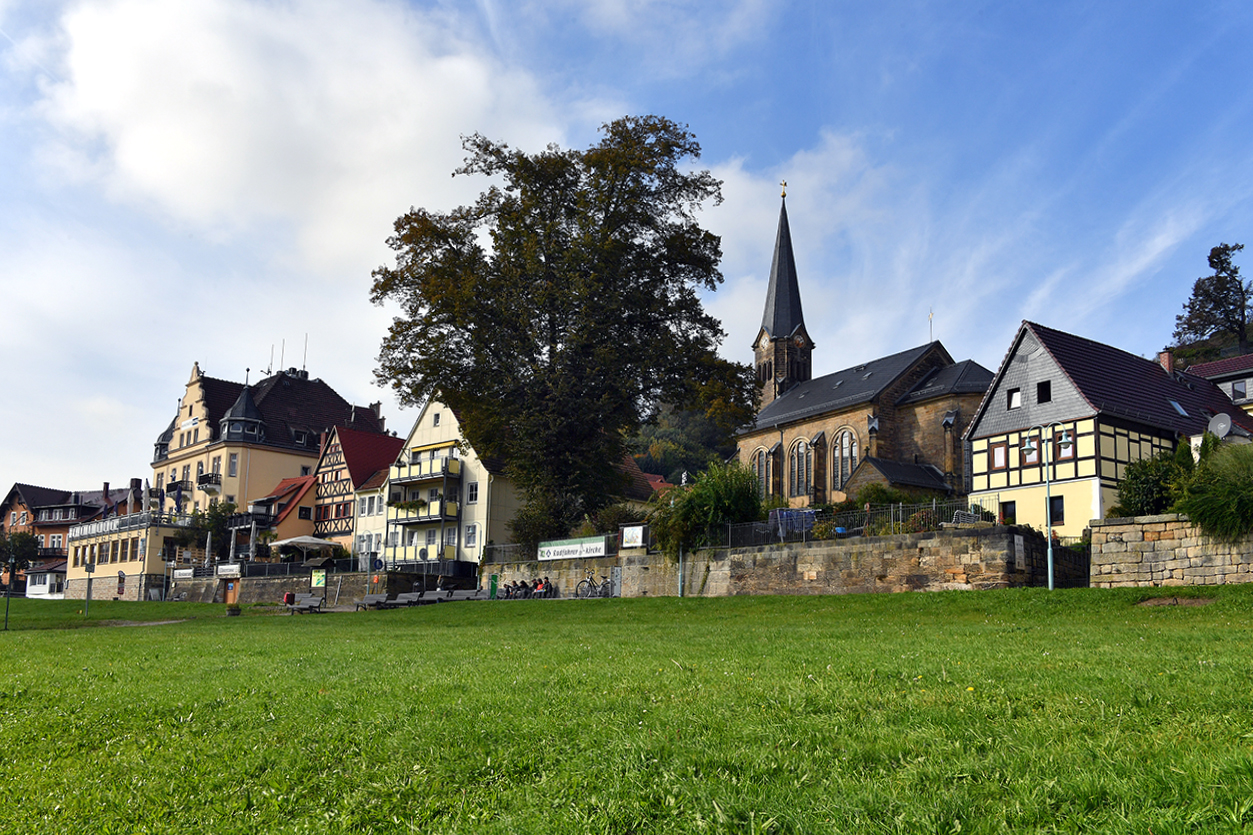
View from the Elbe

Stadt Wehlen is twinned with:

- Wehlen an der Mosel (Rhineland-Palatinate)
- Wangen im Allgäu (Baden-Württemberg
- Dorn-Dürkheim
- Trochtelfingen

== See also ==
- Bergtest near Wehlen, an annual competition walk.
