= Porschdorf =

- Ortsteil of Bad Schandau
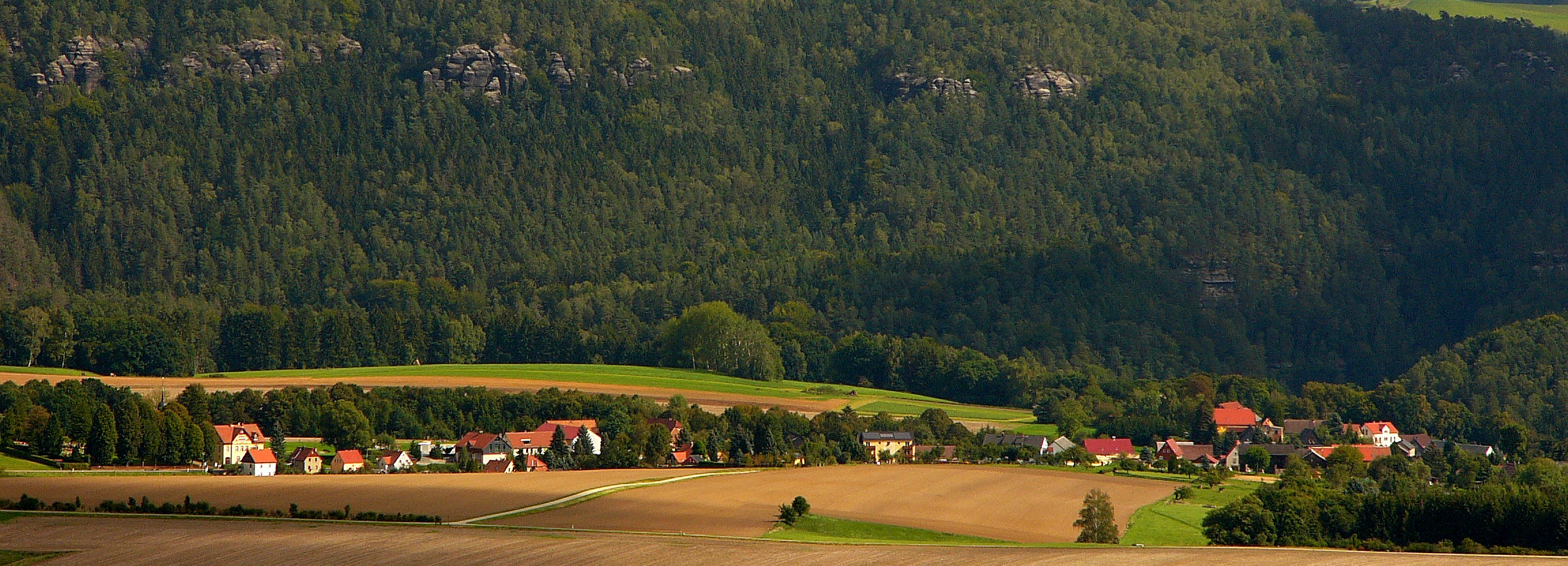
- Panorama of Porschdorf
- Interactive map of Porschdorf
- Location within Germany Location within Saxony
- Coordinates: 50°56′N 14°8′E
- Country: Germany
- State: Saxony
- District: Sächsische Schweiz-Osterzgebirge
- Town: Bad Schandau
- First mentioned: 1443

Area
  - Total: 10.93 km^{2} (4.22 sq mi)
- Elevation: 225 m (738 ft)

Population (2009)
  - Total: 426
  - Density: 39.0/km^{2} (101/sq mi)
- Time zone: UTC+01:00 (CET)
  - Summer (DST): UTC+02:00 (CEST)
- Postal codes: 01814
- Dialling codes: 035022
- Vehicle registration: PIR

Porschdorf is a former municipality in the Sächsische Schweiz-Osterzgebirge district, in Saxony, in eastern Germany. With effect from 1 January 2012, it has been incorporated into the town of Bad Schandau.

== History ==
During World War II, in February 1945, a subcamp of the Flossenbürg concentration camp was established, in which some 250 men, mostly Italian, were subjected to forced labour. In April 1945, surviving prisoners were sent on a death march towards the Ore Mountains.
