= Cotta (Dresden) =

District of the state capital Dresden, Saxony, Germany

- District and statistical district
- Flag

- Coordinates: 51°3′23″N 13°41′15″E
- Country: Germany
- Location: Dresden, Saxony
- Municipality: Cotta
- Surface: 1.97 km²
- Postal code: 01157
- Incorporation: Jan 1, 1903
- Population denstity: 5552 inhabitants/km²

Population (2013)
  - Total: 10,937
  - Metro density: 5,552/km^{2} (14,380/sq mi)
- Postal code: 01157

Cotta (German pronunciation: [ˈkɔta]), located in the western part of the Saxony state capital Dresden, is a district within the city of the same name.

Founded as a Slavic village on the Elbe, Cotta was first documented in 1328. In 1903 it was merged into Dresden along with many other communities. Today, the district is centrally located in the western part of the state capital and features the mouth of the Weißeritz River. Predominantly characterized by buildings from the Wilhelminian period, only a few houses from the historic village center still remain in Cotta.

== Geography ==
=== District and statistical district ===
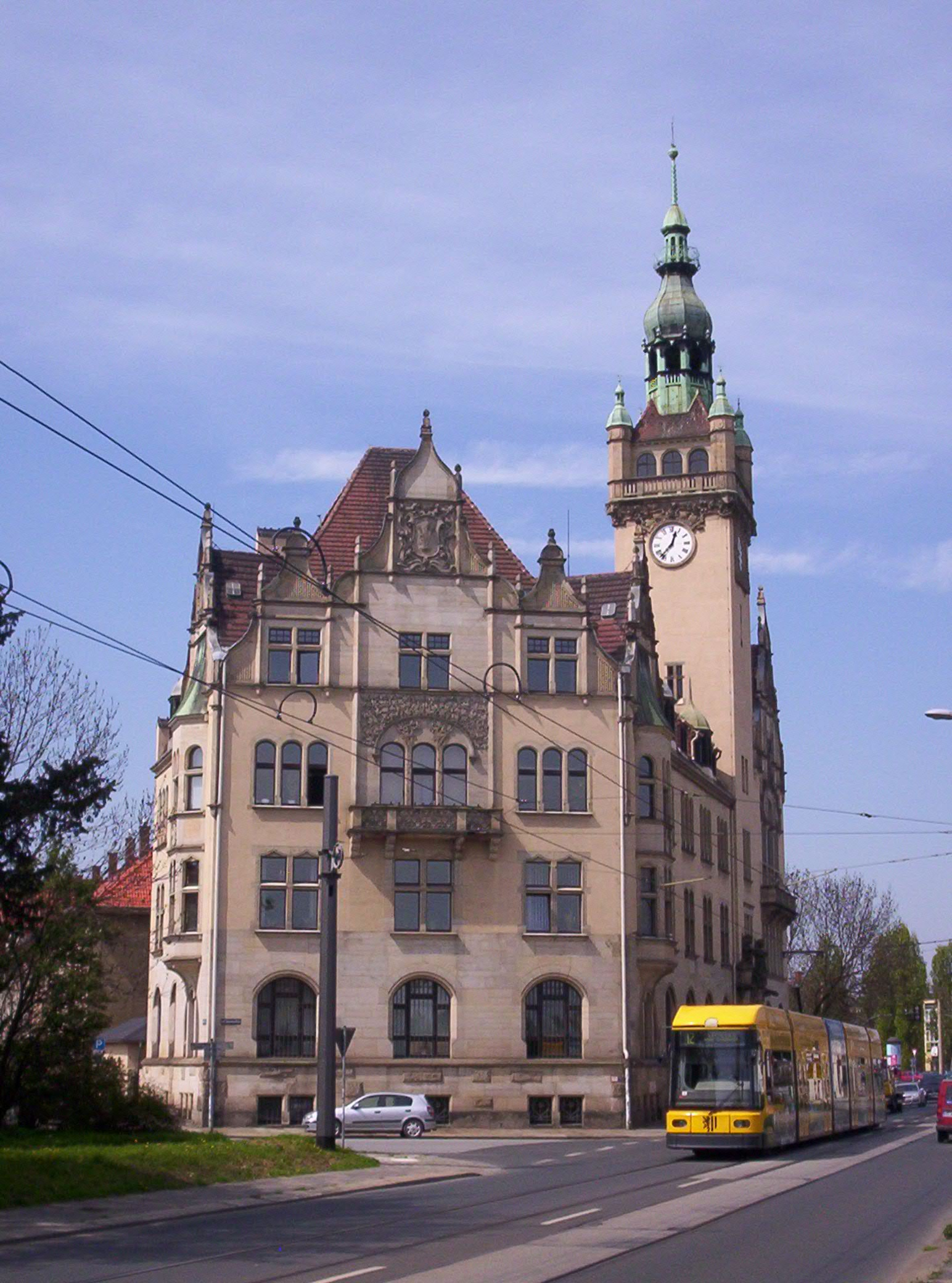
View across Lübecker Straße to the Cotta town hall

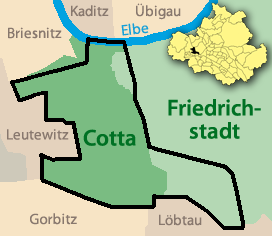
Boundaries of the statistical district of Cotta (black), which extends over parts of the districts of Cotta (dark green) and Friedrichstadt (light green).

=== Geology ===
Cotta lies on the banks of the Elbe, which flows through the Ostragehege and Übigau before reaching the left boundary of the Elbe valley at that point and forming a steep bank that extends all the way to Kemnitz. As a result, the 600-meter-long Cotta Bank's Elbe meadows are extremely constrained. The low-lying areas of the district along the Elbe have been shaped by the fluviatile, eroded valley and the river sediments.

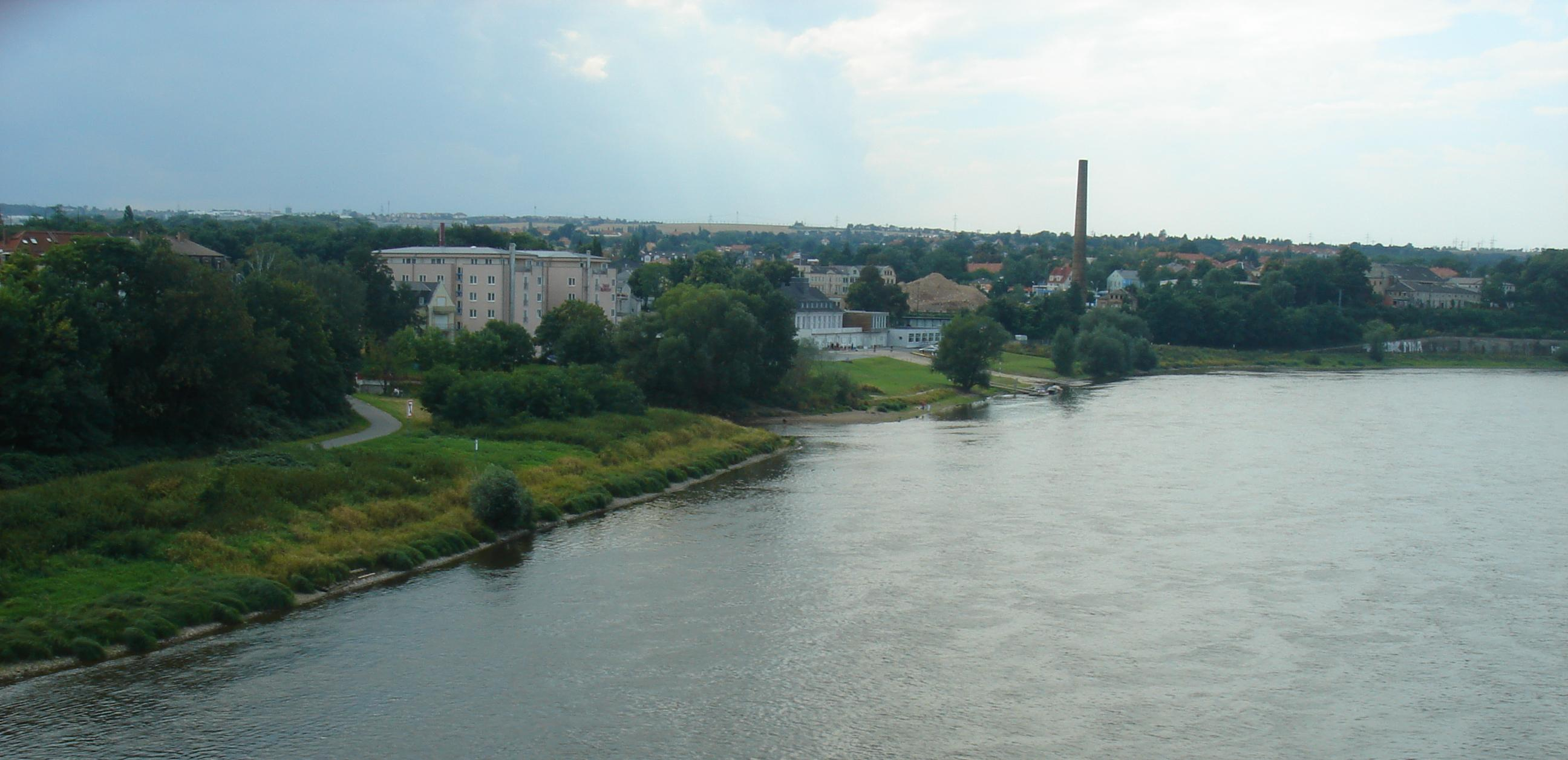
View of the Cottaer Elbufer from the Flügelweg Bridge; on the far right is the former Young Generation Theater

A few kilometers west of Cotta, near the village of Mobschatz, begins the Meißner Hochland, a left-island plateau. It is characterized by gradually rising slopes towards the southwest and has a subsoil with a strong layer of plains. Clayey soil is present in the area close to Tonbergstraße, which is named after it.

At the level of Werkstättenstraße in Cotta, the Weißeritz River is joined by the Weidigtbach, which is piped underground in this area. The Weidigtbach, together with its tributary the Gorbitzbach, drains a catchment area of over six square kilometers that includes Omsewitz, Altfranken, and Wölfnitz.

=== Structural character ===
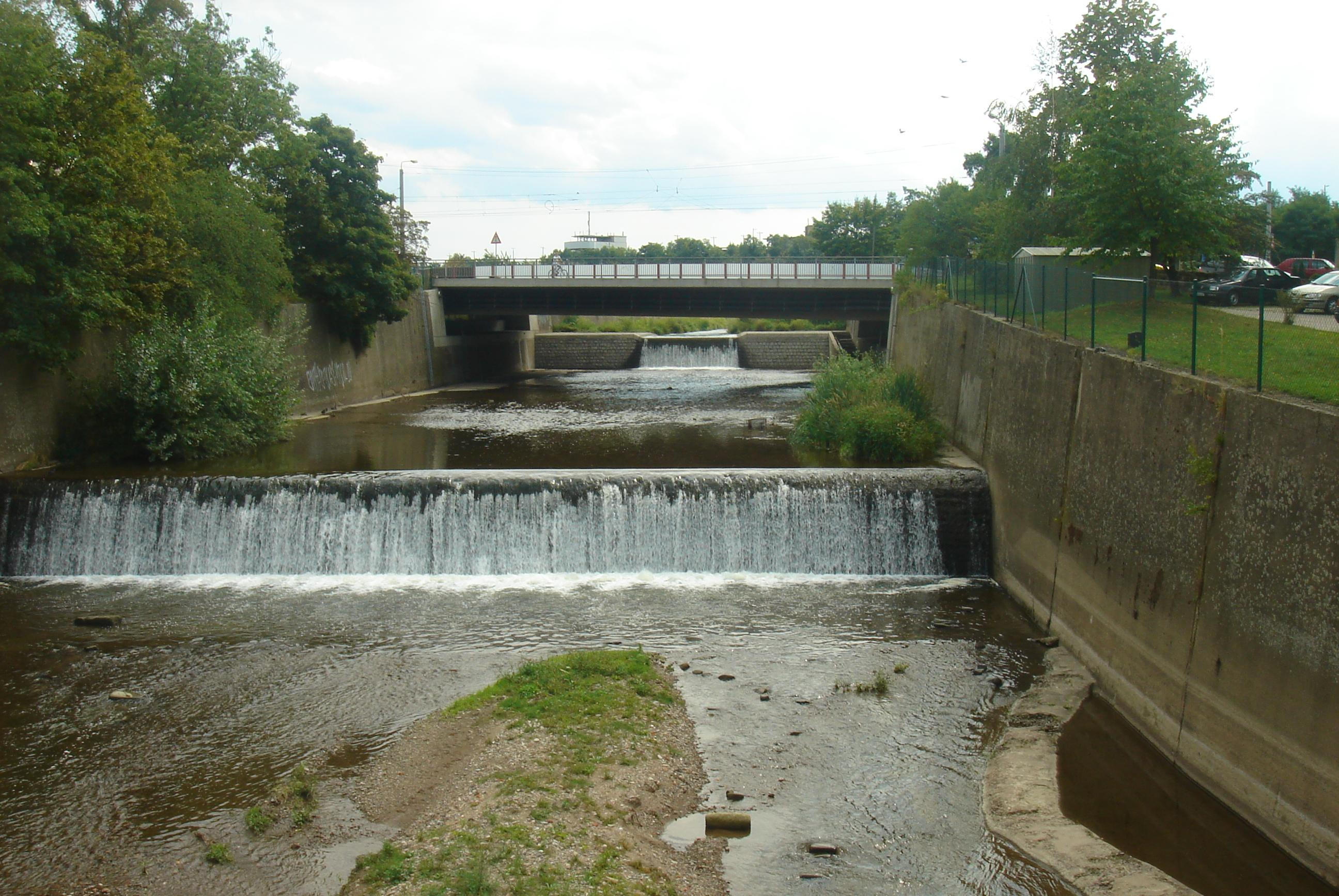
The Weißeritz near Hamburger Strasse marks the boundary between the districts of Cotta and Friedrichstadt.

The built-up area of Cotta has gradually expanded from the historic village center of Altcotta, which is protected by an official preservation statute. The district has expanded particularly to the southeast, southwest, and northwest, along existing traffic routes towards neighboring districts or over them. Planned settlements were also built, evident from the parallel streets in areas such as Rudolf-Renner-/Klopstockstraße and Zöllmener/Weidentalstraße. The high proportion of coffee mill houses is notable, and the densely built former workers' residential district has retained its Wilhelminian era to this day. Only a few old farmsteads have survived along Hebbelstraße. For more than 100 years, various allotment gardens have existed between the individual Cotta districts.

=== Population geography ===
The Cotta statistical district covers an area of just under 2 square kilometers and has a population of nearly 10,000 people. This puts the population density at over 4,900 people per square kilometer, which is above average compared to other Dresden districts. The population density is lower in the neighboring districts of Mickten and Briesnitz, but it increases in the direction of Löbtau and Gorbitz to the south.

The average age of the population in the district is 39.5 years, with an average length of residence of 7.6 years. The population in their 20s to 30s makes up just under 6%, which is approximately 25% more than the rest of the city. Families with children under the age of 18 account for about one-fifth of all households. In 2005, there were around 12 births per 1,000 residents, and 14.1% of the inhabitants are not yet adults.

== History ==
=== Name ===
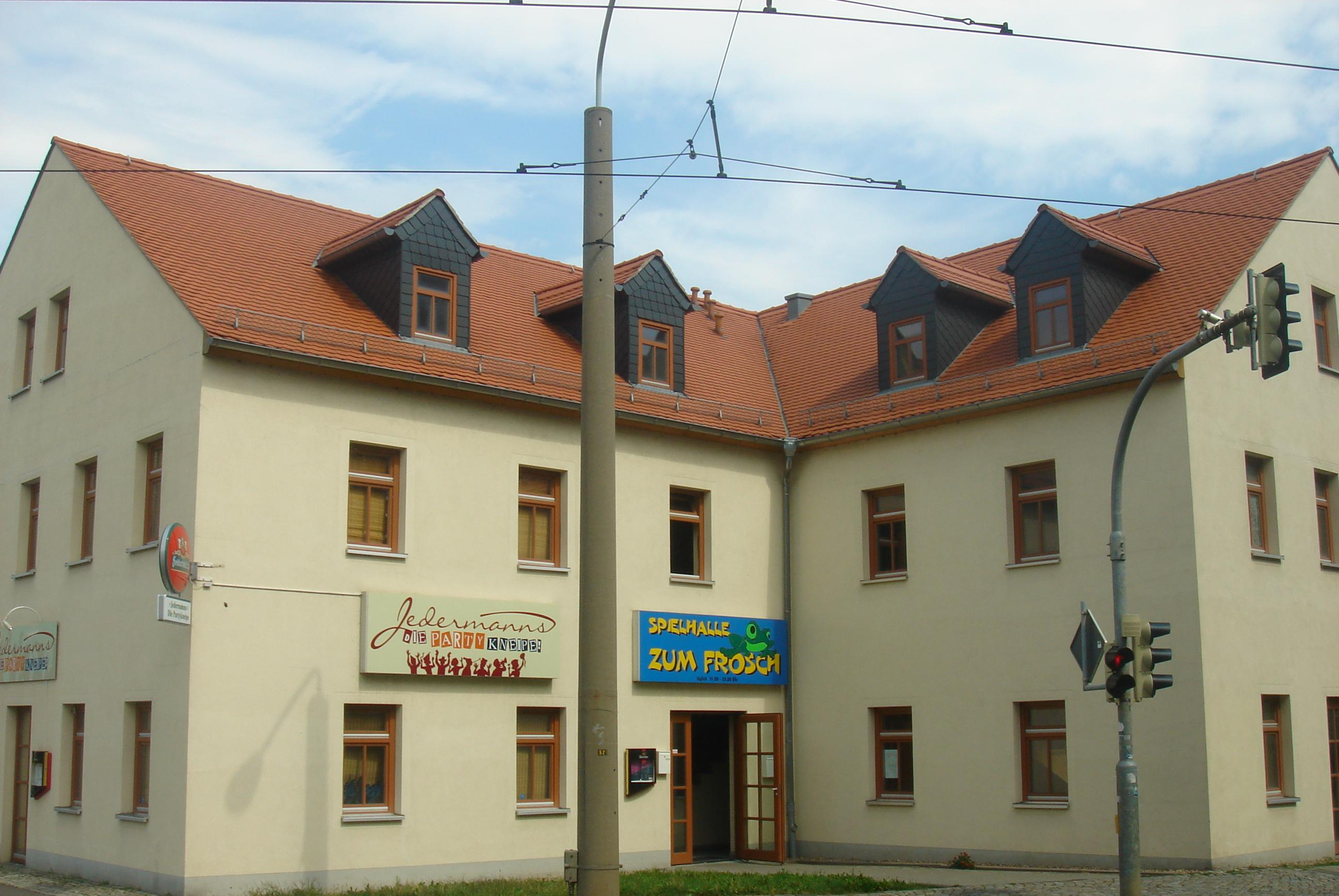
District and shopping center at the "Frosch" in Altcotta

According to historical records, the village was first mentioned in a document dated February 27, 1328, as Kottowe. At that time, the lord of the manor, Hermann the Elder, sold a third of the local estate, and a little later also the manor in the area of today's grammar school, to the Meissen Cathedral. The name Kottowe has Old Sorbian roots, and it is believed to have originated from the Slavic Lokator name Kot or Chot, referring to the village of Chot.

During the 14th century, the name of the location underwent changes, evolving from Kothow (1350) and Kottaw (1397) to Cotta, which was first documented in 1444 with its current spelling. The area was referred to as Kotten in 1485, Kuttaw in the 16th century, and Kotthe in 1517. The village was mentioned again in 1768 under the name Cotta and has been known by this spelling ever since.

The area surrounding the village center along the Weidigtbach, which used to flow directly into the Elbe, was once extremely wet and swampy. It had to be laboriously drained over the years to be put to use for agriculture. As a result, the village, like its neighboring village Kuh-Löbte, was mockingly nicknamed Frosch-Cotte, which means "Frog Cotta".

In the 19th century, the inhabitants of Cotta embraced the nickname and turned it into a positive aspect of their identity. Consequently, when the "Zum Frosch" restaurant was opened in 1862, it was given the name of the frog, and the town hall in Cotta was decorated with stone frogs. Even today, the district newspaper Froschpost in Cotta honors this tradition.

=== Prehistoric settlement ===
Neolithic settlement in the Cotta area is evidenced by archaeological remains, and extensive research was carried out during the 1990s, resulting in the discovery of a female skeleton estimated to be over 7,000 years old. The skeleton was given the name "Rebecca" and is a remarkable find from the Stone Age.

The manner of her burial is very unusual for the period of the linear pottery. In contrast to comparable skeletons, she was found in a stretched posture and prone position, with parts of the skull and facial bones missing and a large stone in the pelvic area was found. The remains of the skeleton are kept in the Klotzscher Depot building of the State Museum of Prehistory.

=== Middle Ages ===
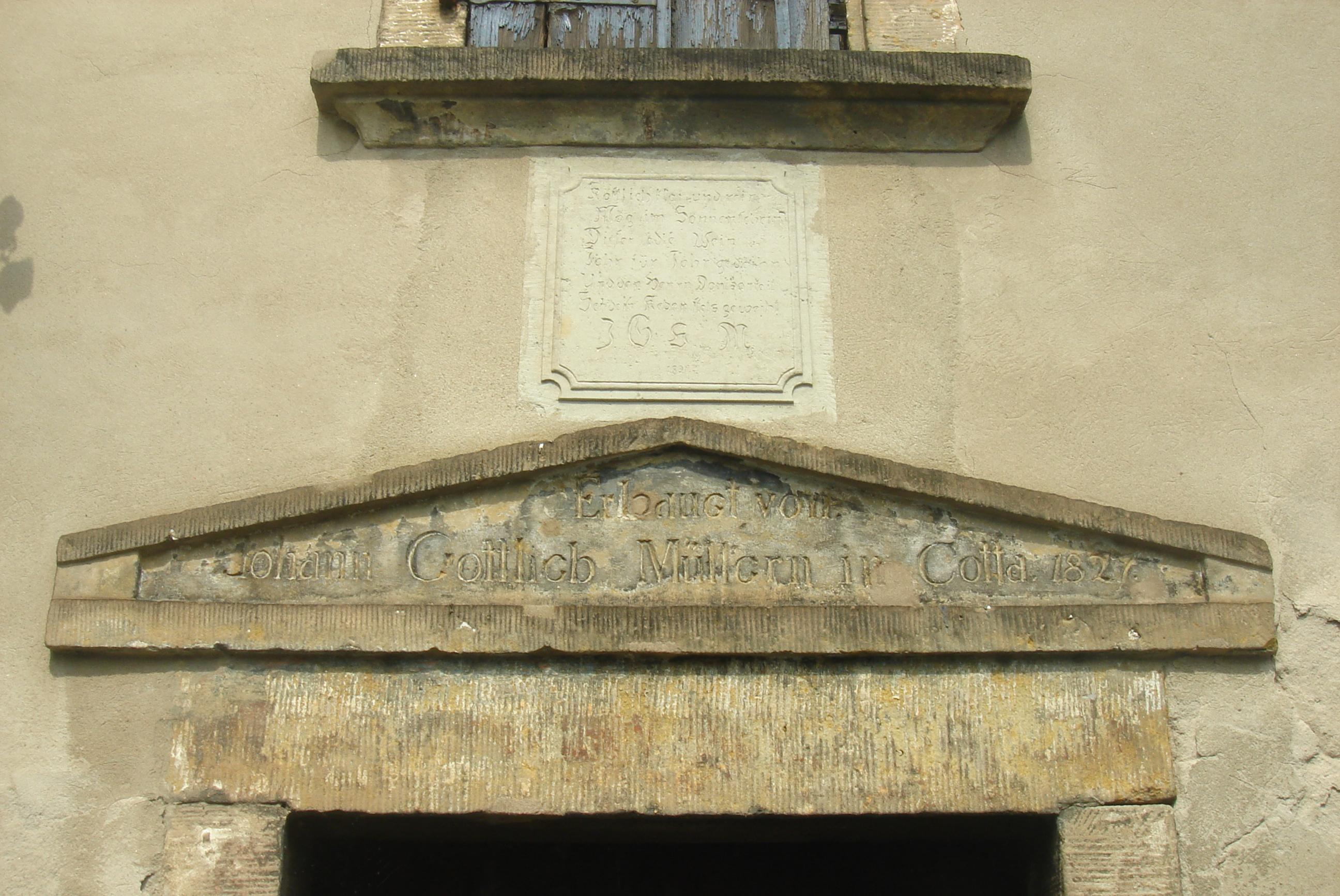
Facade detail on a garden pavilion near the Cottaer Hofbrauhaus, which has since been demolished

Rundling Cotta was founded by Slavic-speaking settlers several centuries before it was first mentioned. Originally located in present-day Altcotta, over time a number of homes were added along Hebbelstraße. The neighboring villages of Wernten and Rostagk, which were located to the east and became uninhabitable after the Elbe flooded them in the 15th century, were likely abandoned. A mill in Cotta was documented in 1338.

Between 1416 and 1512, the secular landlords' properties that remained in their possession in the 14th century also passed to the Meissen Cathedral Chapter, which became the sole landlord. The manor, which the cathedral chapter had acquired from Hermann the Elder in 1328, was expanded into an outlying estate. Cotta was then under the jurisdiction of the Bishop of Meissen and was in the district of the episcopal court of Briesnitz. Cotta also had a parish in Briesnitz, and Cotta's children attended school there. As early as the Middle Ages, the church paths of the neighboring villages of Wölfnitz and Löbtau, which ran along today's Gottfried-Keller-Straße or Cossebauder/Lübecker Straße, crossed the Cottaer Flur.

=== Modern era ===
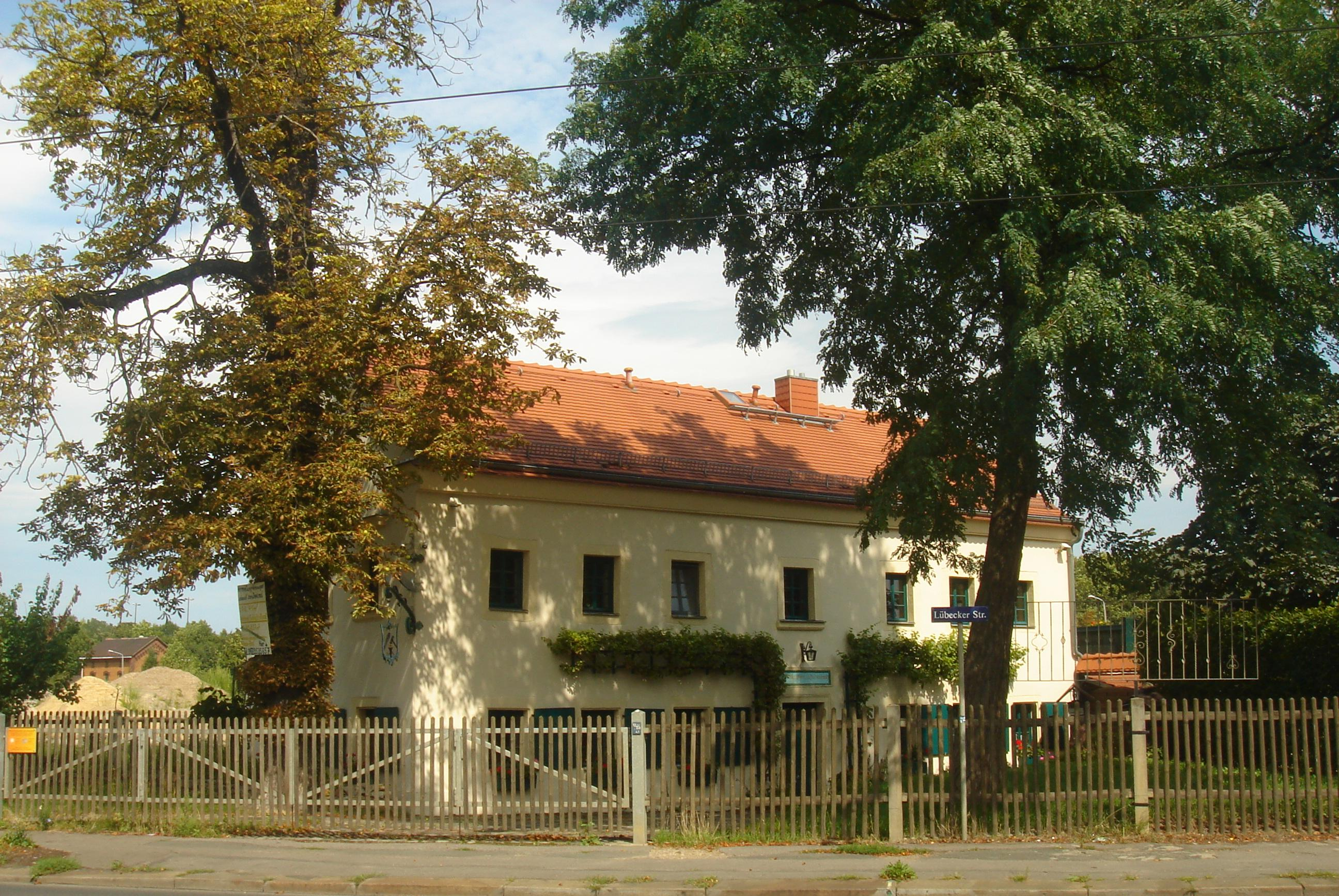
Old Cotta building on Lübecker Straße opposite the town hall

In the 16th century, there were three large field stones in the river bed of the Elbe known as the Cotta Hunger Stones. These stones would only emerge from the water during times of extremely low water levels. They were placed in the Elbe to commemorate the devastating famines of that time caused by droughts. The center stone bears the date 1630.

Similar to its neighboring villages, Cotta suffered from war and destruction regularly, especially during the Seven Years' War. Despite this, the settlement was continuously rebuilt.

In 1711, Cotta was affected by witch hunts, and Georg Kirsten and his wife were caught up in the witch trials on the accusation of holding a dragon.

=== Industrialization ===
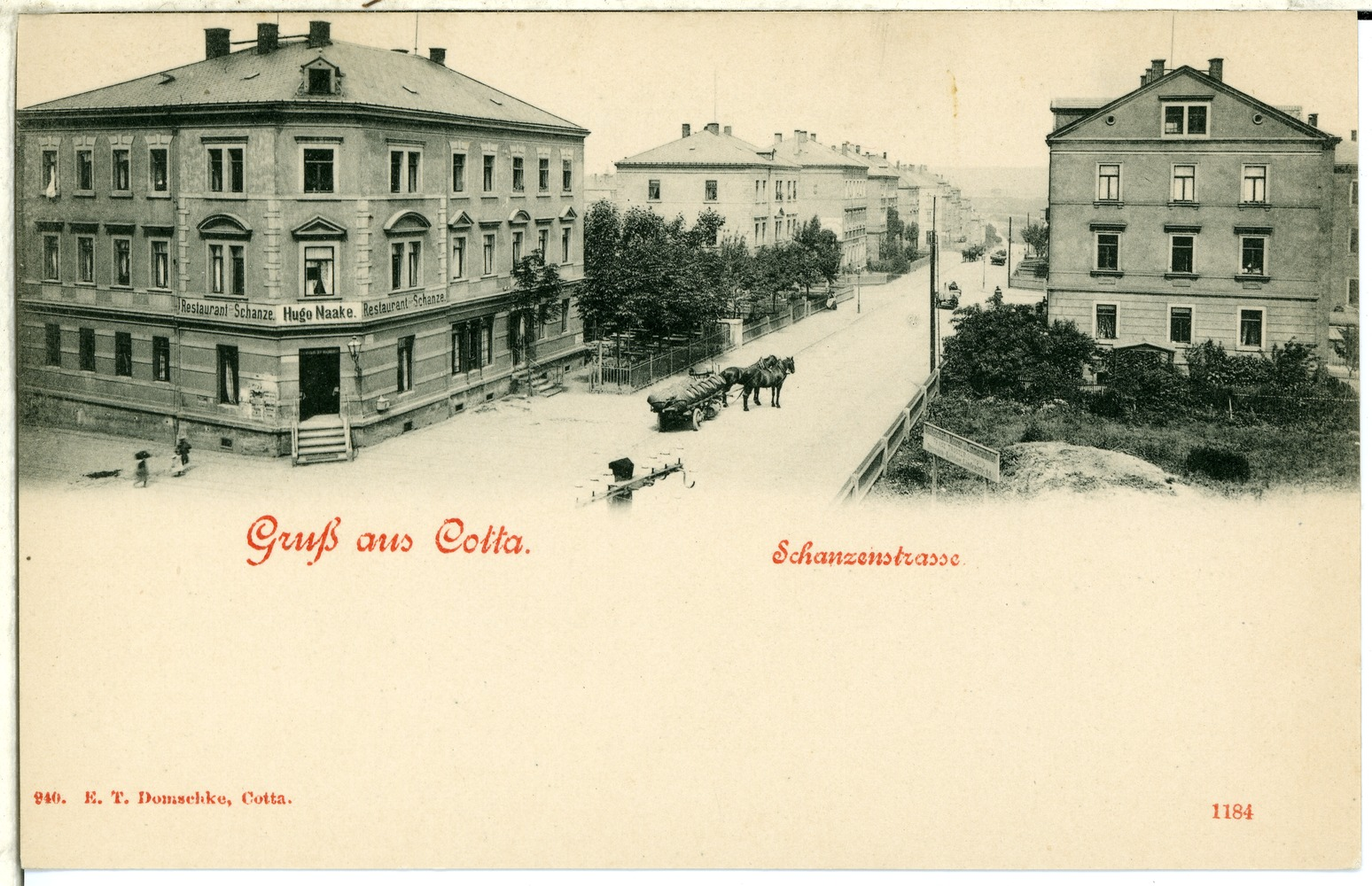
Schanzenstraße (1899)

During the 19th century, Löbtau and Friedrichstadt witnessed the establishment of numerous industrial companies, which led to a significant increase in population. While Cotta was only slightly affected by industrialization, it quickly developed into a residential area for workers. By 1900, its population had increased by sixfold between 1870 and 1890, making it one of the most populous rural settlements in Saxony. In response to this growth, many new streets were constructed, with those running east–west being named after local settlements, and those running north–south named after German poets.

During the period of rapid growth, property speculation was rampant, and many new houses were built. Almost all of them were the aforementioned coffee mill houses, which continue to characterize Cotta and its neighboring districts to this day. Some of these buildings were erected on the site of a ski jump that had been leveled in 1875 and constructed by the Prussian army in 1866 during the German War at Lerchenberg. As a result, the area around Rudolf-Renner-Straße, previously known as Schanzenstraße, became known as the Schanzenviertel, which extends as far as Löbtau.

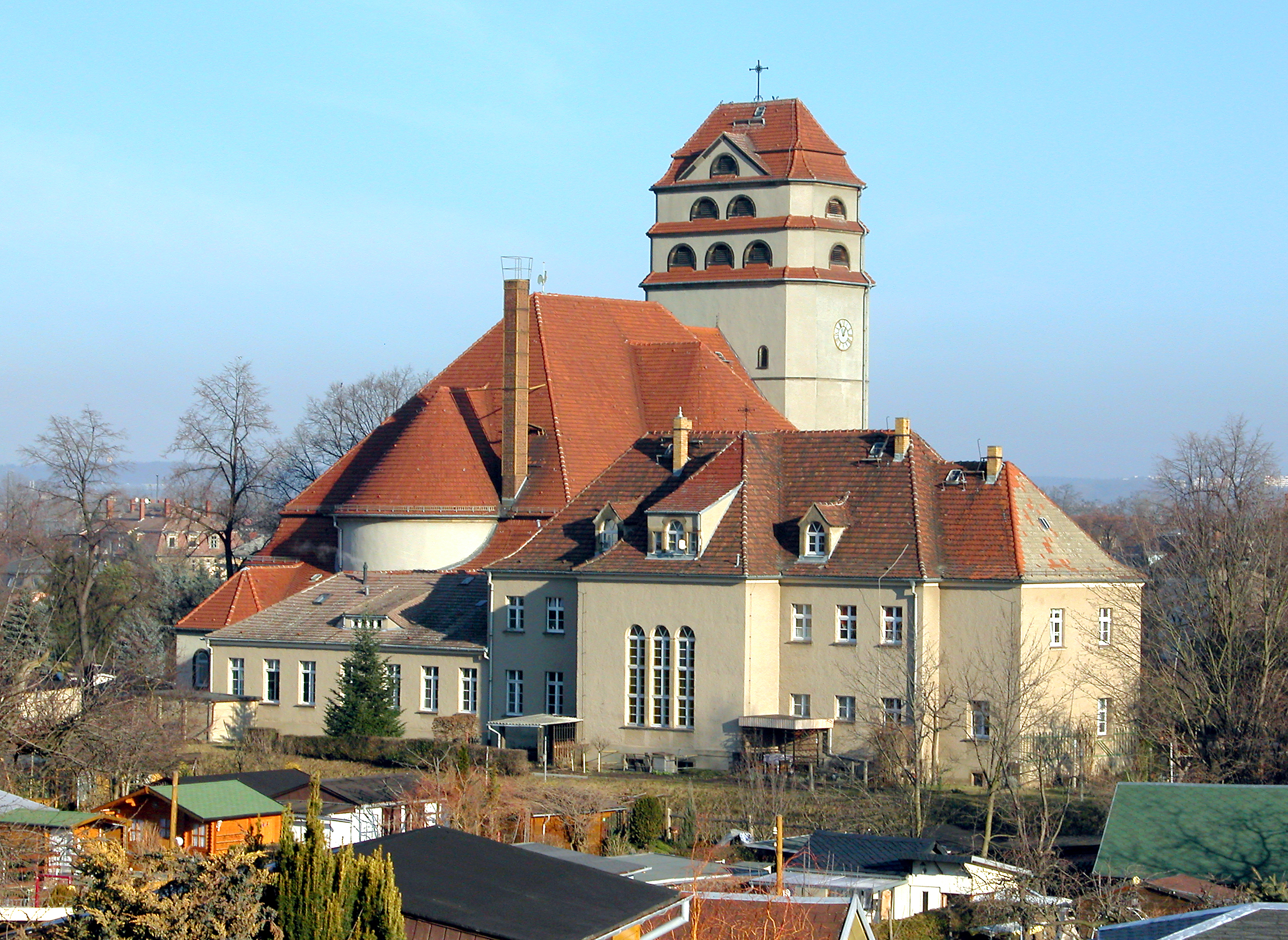
Evangelical Church of the Redeemer

The period of population growth brought further changes in Cotta. In 1869, Cotta built its first independent school building after leaving the school affiliation with Briesnitz. This building underwent numerous extensions in 1873 and 1880 and had to be supplemented by a second building in 1889. Other Cotta school structures were built later. The construction of a separate church building also became necessary. In 1895, a half-timbered structure with 600 seats and a Jehmlich organ was built on Hebbelstraße as a temporary solution. A bell tower, which was constructed around 1905 but no longer exists, was also added. Since the completion of the Heilandskirche in 1927, the temporary church has been used for commercial purposes. The city funded the construction of the new Cotta town hall in 1900.

Cotta was linked to the Berlin-Dresden railway line in 1875, but it wasn't until April 22, 1900, that a streetcar connection to Dresden's city center was established. The Dresden Tramway Company's line initially ended at the Schusterhaus and was later extended in 1906 as the Cotta-Cossebaude suburban line via Stetzsch and Gohlis to Cossebaude. Three years later, the company completed the connecting line to Löbtau along today's Rudolf-Renner-Straße.

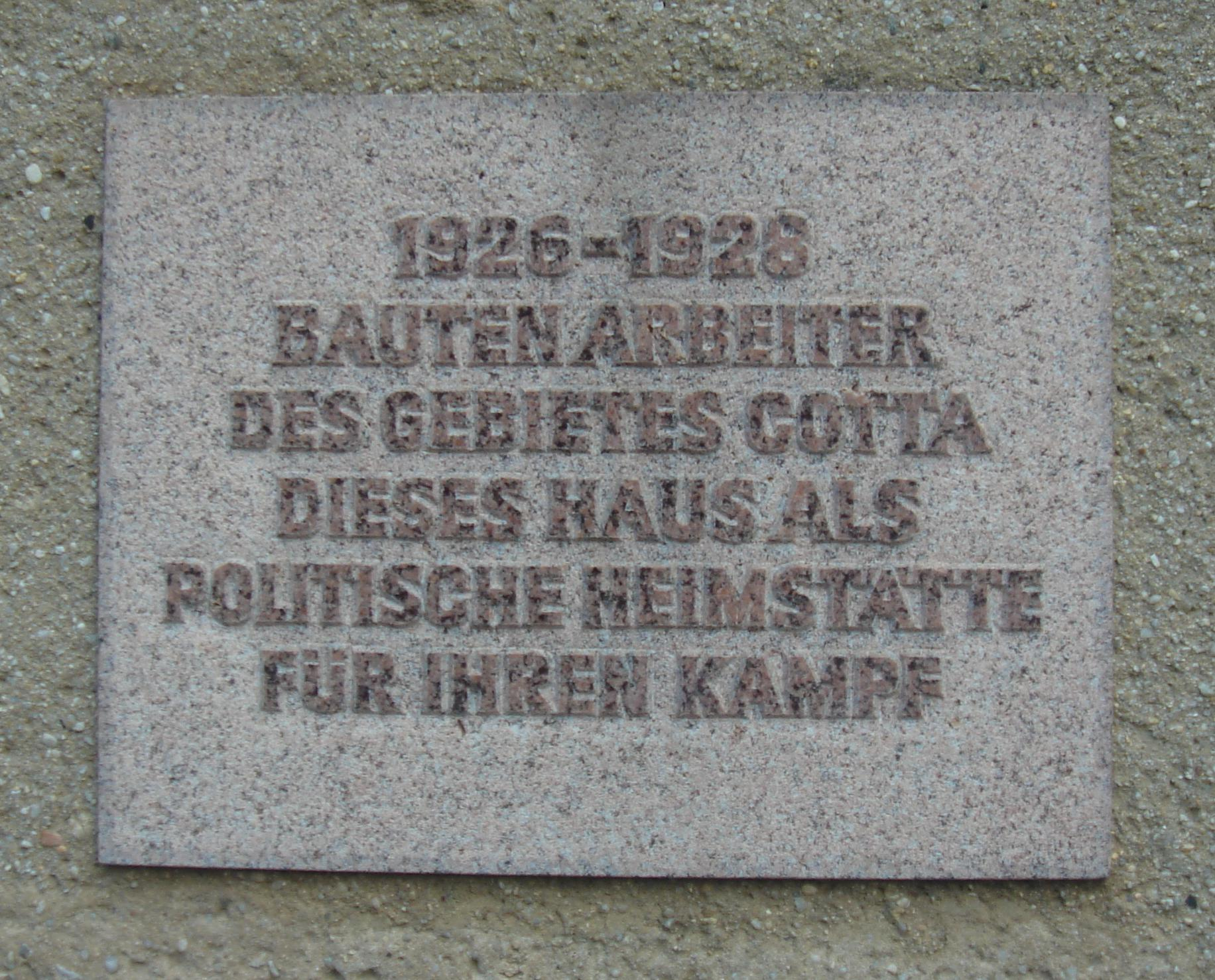
Commemorative plaque for the construction work of Cotta workers at the Volkshaus

Despite the advantages of progress, Cotta's citizens also faced some drawbacks. For instance, a knacker's shop operated on the Lerchenberg between 1862 and 1915, closing down a few years later after Hans Erlwein finished building the city's cattle and slaughterhouse in the Great Ostragehege in 1910. The residents of Cotta had to put up with the smell of animal carcass disposal in addition to the fact that a sizable portion of the feces in Cotta was dumped into the Elbe by the fertilizer export company that cleaned up the Dresden cesspools. The alluvial sewage system to the Kaditz sewage treatment plant did not start operating until 1910.

In 1893, the course of the Weißeritz River had to be altered due to the construction of the railway line on the 26er Ring in the center of Dresden, which affected Cotta's location. As a result of this change, Cotta was now situated at the mouth of a large outflow of Ore Mountains, increasing the risk of floods. This risk became a reality in late July 1897, when severe flooding caused significant damage in Cotta.

In 1900, Cotta was considered a relatively impoverished community, collecting around 5 marks in taxes per resident, which is significantly lower than the figures for Dresden and Blasewitz, which were 18.50 marks and 38 marks, respectively. Unlike the wealthy villa colony of Blasewitz, Cotta did not resist its integration into Dresden on January 1, 1903.

After 1900, Cotta emerged as a center of the labor movement, particularly social democracy, due to its high proportion of workers. The construction of the Volkshaus Cotta on Hebbelstraße in 1925 provided a dedicated meeting place for workers, followed by the expansion of the Hebbelbad in 1929 and the construction of cooperative settlements. In addition, the construction of the Flügelweg bridge established Cotta as a significant traffic junction, intersecting the largest north–south connection in the western part of the city, federal highway 6, and other main roads in the district area.

=== During and after World War II ===
Compared to other, more centrally located districts of Dresden, the number of residences destroyed in the Cotta area due to the saturation air raids during World War II was relatively low, with only around 100 being destroyed. However, despite the smaller number of losses, the impact was still significant. The Cotta cemetery is the final resting place of 98 civilians who were killed during these bombings.

During the GDR era, the old structures in Cotta deteriorated due to a lack of maintenance funding. As a result, some homes had to be demolished or closed down. Despite the construction of a few new buildings around 1965, the numerous prefabricated slab structures built elsewhere led to a significant population decline in Cotta that could not be reversed.

After reunification, a comprehensive wave of refurbishment began in Cotta, resulting in the restoration of most of the buildings and the addition of several modern office buildings and hotels. In 2000, the old village restaurant "Zum Frosch" was replaced by a local supply center featuring shops and restaurants

Cotta was affected by the Elbe flood in 2002, which caused some damage. Despite the district's northwestern parts being located on high ground, the intersection of Hamburger Straße and the railway subway were flooded due to the Weißeritz, a tributary of the Elbe. In addition, backwater caused significant flooding of nearby properties at the Rennersdorfer Straße level along the Weidigtbach.

=== Population development ===
Year	Population
1559	21
1764	30
1834	248
1871	1.036
1890	6.080
2006	9.672

== Politics ==
Cotta, with its town hall, serves as the center of the district of the same name and is the seat Dresden of a district office. It encompasses large parts of the western urban area between Dölzschen and Stetzsch, including the densely populated districts of Löbtau and Gorbitz.

After undergoing a significant shift in the population structure of the former working-class district and political development throughout the 20th century, Cotta lost its previous position as a social democratic center in Dresden. The CDU and the Left have since dominated various elections in the area.

=== Federal election 2005 ===
In the 2005 federal election, Cotta was part of the Dresden II - Meissen I federal electoral district, and 73% of Cotta's constituency-eligible voters participated in the election. The CDU received the most votes with 26.7%, followed by the SPD with 24.9% and the Left Party with 20.1%. Additionally, the FDP, Greens, and NPD received more than 5% of the vote.

=== State election 2004 ===
The constituency of Dresden 4 is the entire western region of Dresden, including the Cotta district. In the 2004 election for the 4th Saxon state parliament, the CDU won easily with 57.6% of the vote. The Left Party came in second with 21.5%, followed by the NPD with 10%. The FDP, SPD, and Greens were behind them in terms of vote share.

=== Local elections 2004 ===
In the Dresden City Council election held on June 13, 2004, the PDS received the highest number of votes in Cotta, with 25.2%, slightly ahead of the CDU with 24.5%. The Greens, FDP, and SPD all garnered between 9% and 10%, just ahead of the National Alliance of NPD and DVU, which received 8.4% of the vote. Voter turnout was 38.7%, which was lower than the city-wide average of 45.9%. The results are not fully representative of the city of Dresden as a whole, where the CDU won by several percentage points over the PDS, and the National Alliance was only able to gather 4.02% of the votes, thus achieving a significantly weaker overall result than in the city of Dresden as a whole.

=== Mayor election 2008 ===
In the election for mayor in the Cotta district, CDU candidate Helma Orosz emerged as the clear winner, with 48.13% of the vote, which was an average result compared to the rest of the city. Out of a total of 8279 eligible voters, 1288 of the 2676 valid votes cast were in favor of Orosz. This pushed Klaus Sühl (The Left), Dirk Hilbert (FDP), Peter Lames (SPD), and Eva Jähnigen (Greens) to other places.

== Culture and Sights ==
=== Theater ===
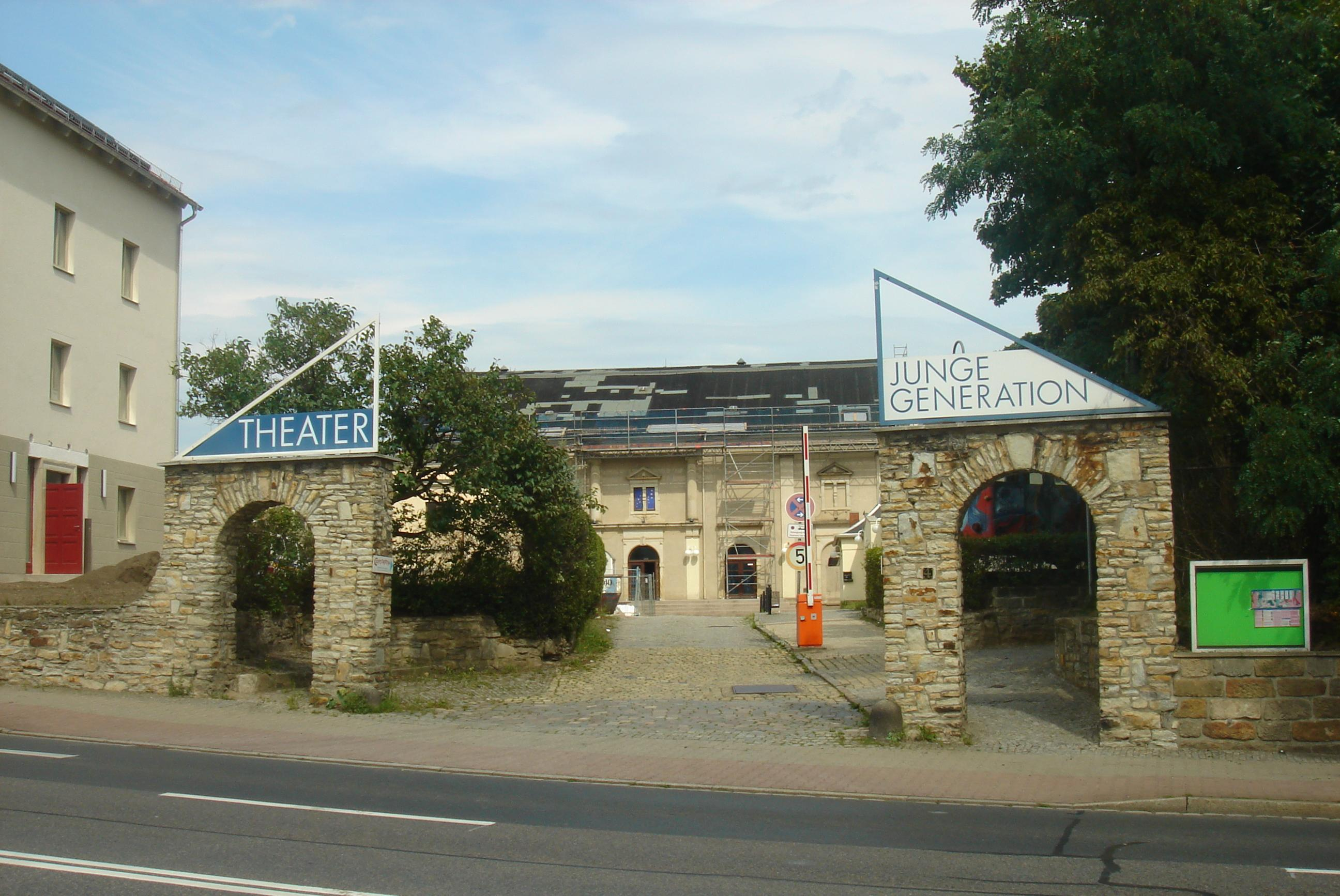
The former Young Generation Theater

In 1886, the Ballhaus Constantia opened on Meißner Landstraße, becoming one of the most popular dance venues in western Dresden. The observation terrace, which offered a stunning view of the Elbe, was known as the balcony of Dresden's west. In 1945, after the destruction caused by the war, all the large municipal theaters in Dresden were destroyed by air raids. However, the Ballhaus Constantia, a ballroom with almost 1,000 seats, survived and became a regular theater venue from 1947 onwards, with performances mainly for children and teenagers under the name Volksbühne. On April 21, 1950, the venue was officially named "Theater der Jungen Generation" (Theater of the Young Generation). After a fire in 1976, the theater underwent a modernization process, which was completed in 1979. During the GDR era, more than 10 million spectators attended performances, and 70 plays were premiered at the theater or nationwide. In 2016, the theater moved to the former Mitte power plant between Wettiner Platz and Könneritzstraße, which was converted into a cultural venue in 2014.

=== Volkshaus ===
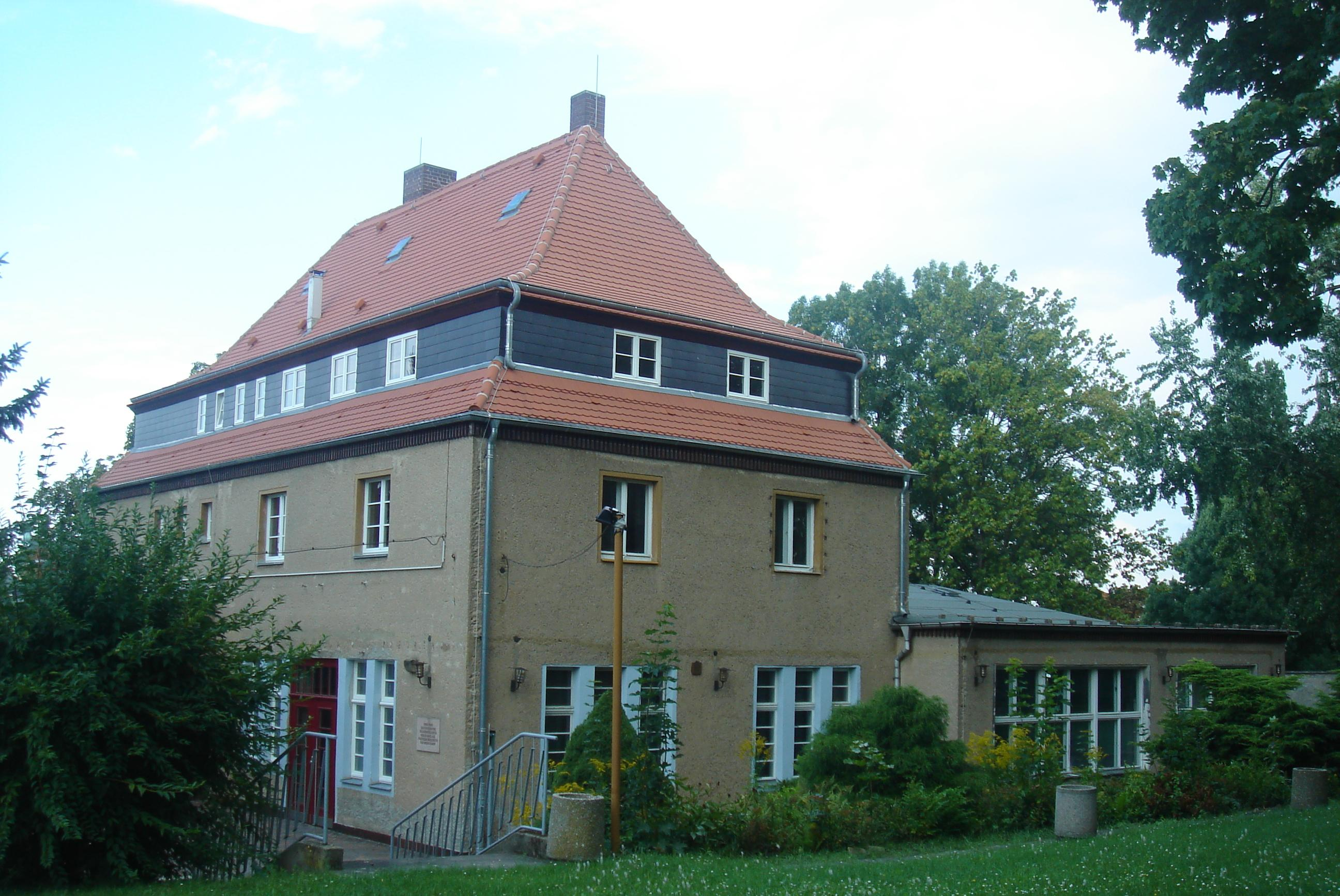
The Volkshaus Cotta is now used as a cultural center.

The Volkshaus Cotta was constructed by workers from the Cotta district between 1923 and 1926 to serve as a community meeting place after they had been unsuccessful in acquiring an existing building. The building, which was designed by Kurt Bärbig, was entirely financed by donations and voluntary labor. By 1928, the Volkshaus had been expanded to include a public restaurant with a bowling alley and a youth room, in addition to its conference rooms. In 1964, the city of Dresden established the Kulturhaus Richard Gärtner in the building, named after an active SPD member who had been involved in its construction. To this day, the Volkshaus Cotta remains a popular venue for events in the community.

=== Cultural monuments ===
==== City Hall ====
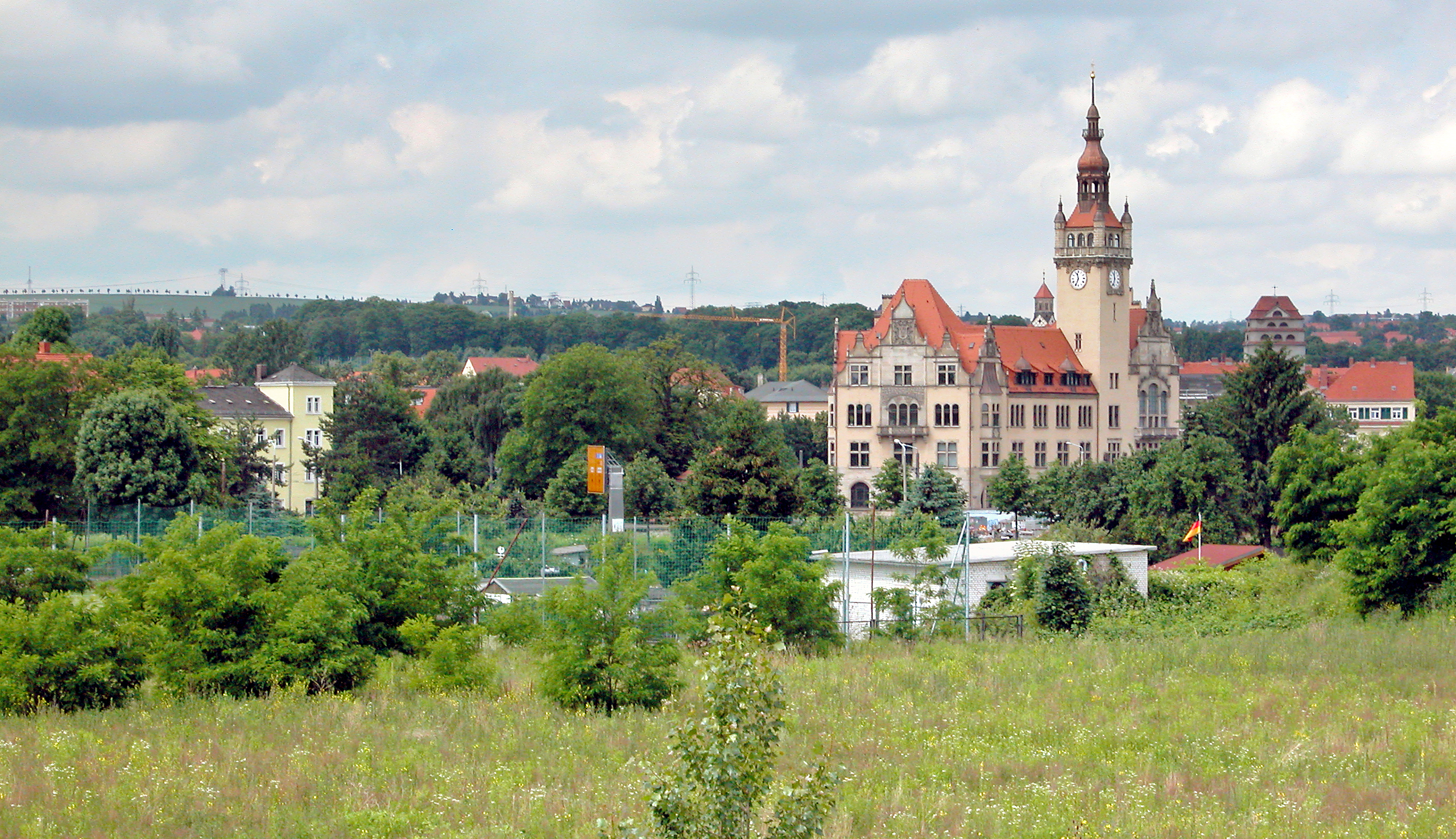
The town hall, the seat of the Cotta district office

The Cotta town hall, located on Lübecker Straße near the center of Altcotta village, was constructed in November 1899 in Neo-Renaissance style and was inaugurated in April 1901. To build the town hall, several houses and the Cottaer Dorfteich had to be removed, as they had become obsolete shortly before, at the latest, after the relocation of the Weidigtbach. However, the Cotta municipal council only used the town hall for less than two years, as Cotta lost its independence in January 1903 when it was incorporated into the Saxon royal seat of Dresden. From then on, the district administrations in Dresden-Cotta and, starting from 1958, Dresden-West were housed in the building. Since 1991, the district office of Cotta (formerly known as the local office of Cotta until 2018) has been located in this building.

==== Churches ====
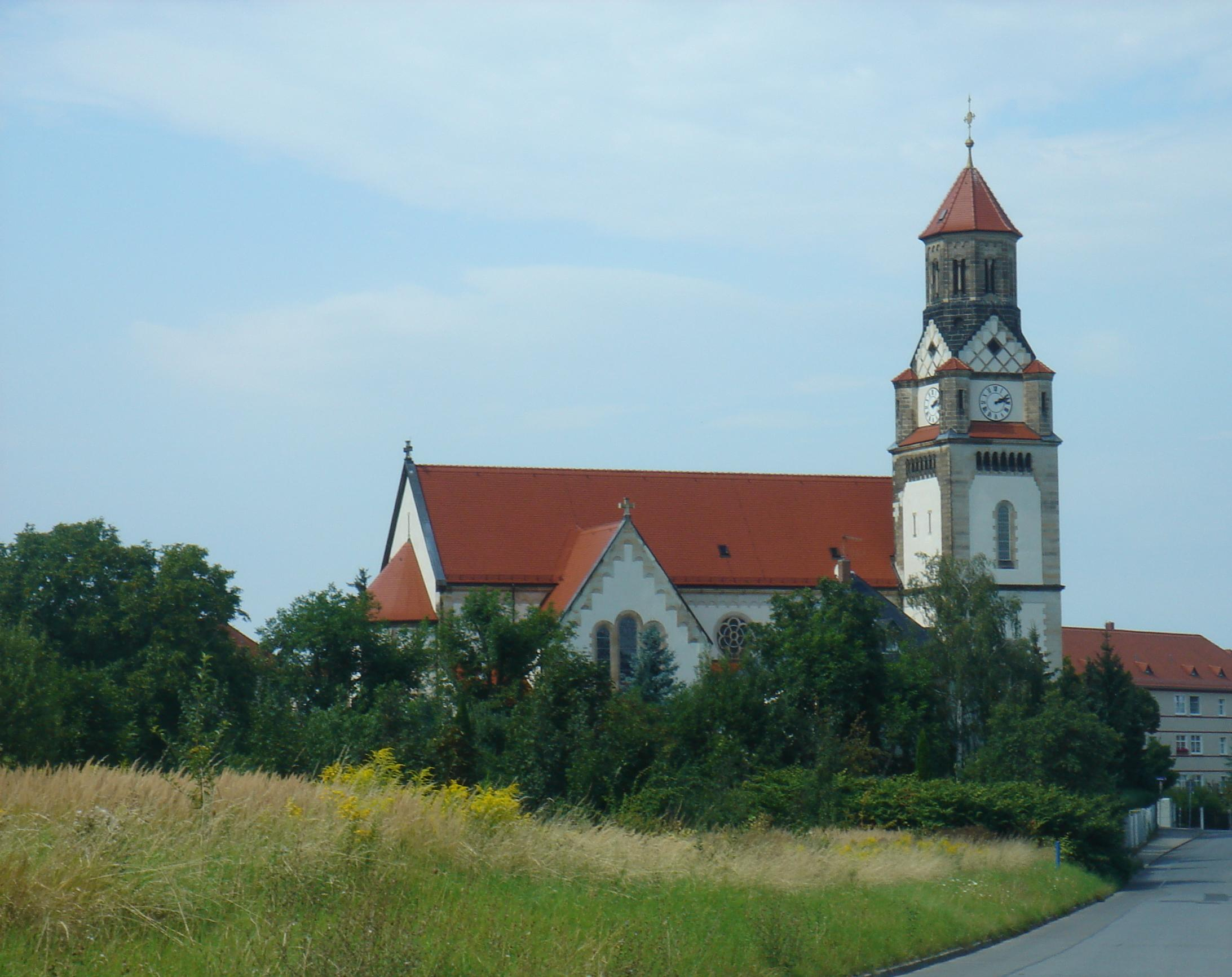
Catholic Marienkirche

The Catholic Marienkirche is situated on a hill at the intersection of Klaus-Groth-Straße and Gottfried-Keller-Straße. The two-nave building was designed in the historicism architectural style by Paderborn cathedral master builder Arnold Güldenpfennig and constructed in 1906 under the direction of Dresden architect Heino Otto. It features a laterally positioned square tower and octagonal superstructure. Above the high altar, Josef Goller created the stained glass. Although the name of the church and parish office is Unserer Lieben Frau, it is more commonly referred to as Marienkirche. Since 1991, the parish has been administered by the Steyl missionaries.

In 1927, after temporarily using an interim church at Hebbelstraße 18, the Heilandskirche became the center of the Evangelical-Lutheran parish of Cotta, which had been independent since 1897. The Protestant sacred building, featuring a massive church tower, was designed by Rudolf Kolbe, a prominent architect from Loschwitz, and construction began in 1914. Adjacent to the church at the western end of Tonbergstraße is the vicarage. Following World War II, the tower of the Heilandskirche, which remained intact, received the cast steel bells from the Jakobikirche in the Wilsdruffer suburb, destroyed in the air raids of February 13, 1945. Additionally, the parish hall was equipped with an altar by Friedrich Press. The Cotta cemetery, established in 1897, is located in the north of Gorbitz. Many Cotta residents and 98 civilian air-raid victims who perished in the world wars were buried here. A stone-high cross above the burial ground commemorates them. Notable burials include soprano Elfride Trötschel.

The Immanuel Church of the Evangelical Methodist is situated at Hühndorfer Straße 22. The building, constructed in 1927, does not have a typical church appearance. The church hall, which can accommodate up to 150 people, is simple in design and features a Jehmlich organ that was installed in 1947. The building underwent significant renovations between 1991 and 2007.

==== Faust's winery ====
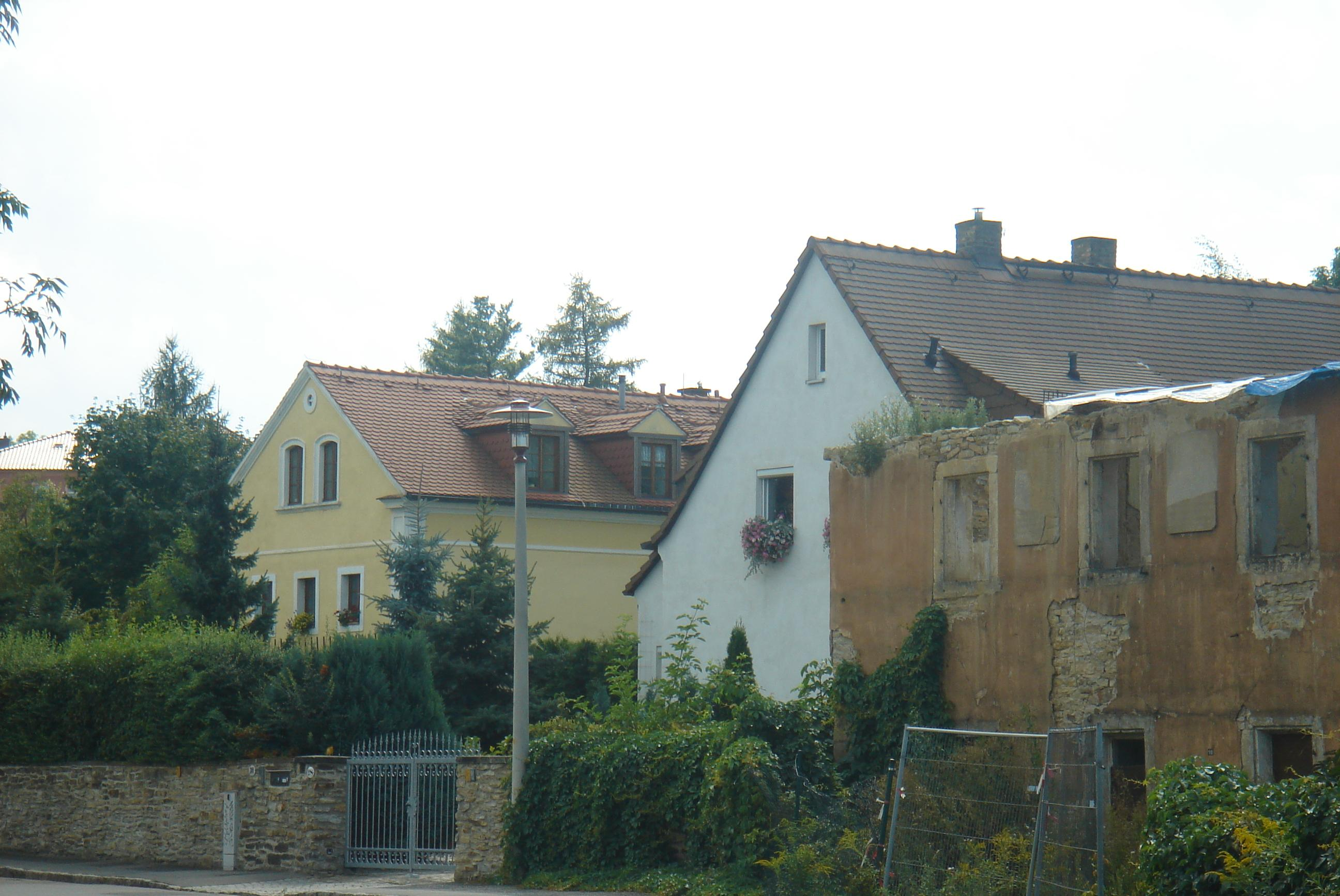
Cotta village center on Hebbelstraße, on the right the ruins of Faust's winery

The historic Cotta village center, comprising Altcotta and Hebbelstraße, still includes five buildings constructed prior to the Gründerzeit building boom. Only the outer walls of a few other old houses, such as the Faustian winery, have survived. The former winery, located at Hebbelstraße 26 and built shortly after the Seven Years' War in 1764, features a round-arched gate and comprises several sub-buildings. Several old inscriptions on the building's history are attached to small plaques on the street-facing façade. Although the winery has deteriorated over the last few decades, there are plans to rebuild it.

==== Deep Elbe tunnel ====
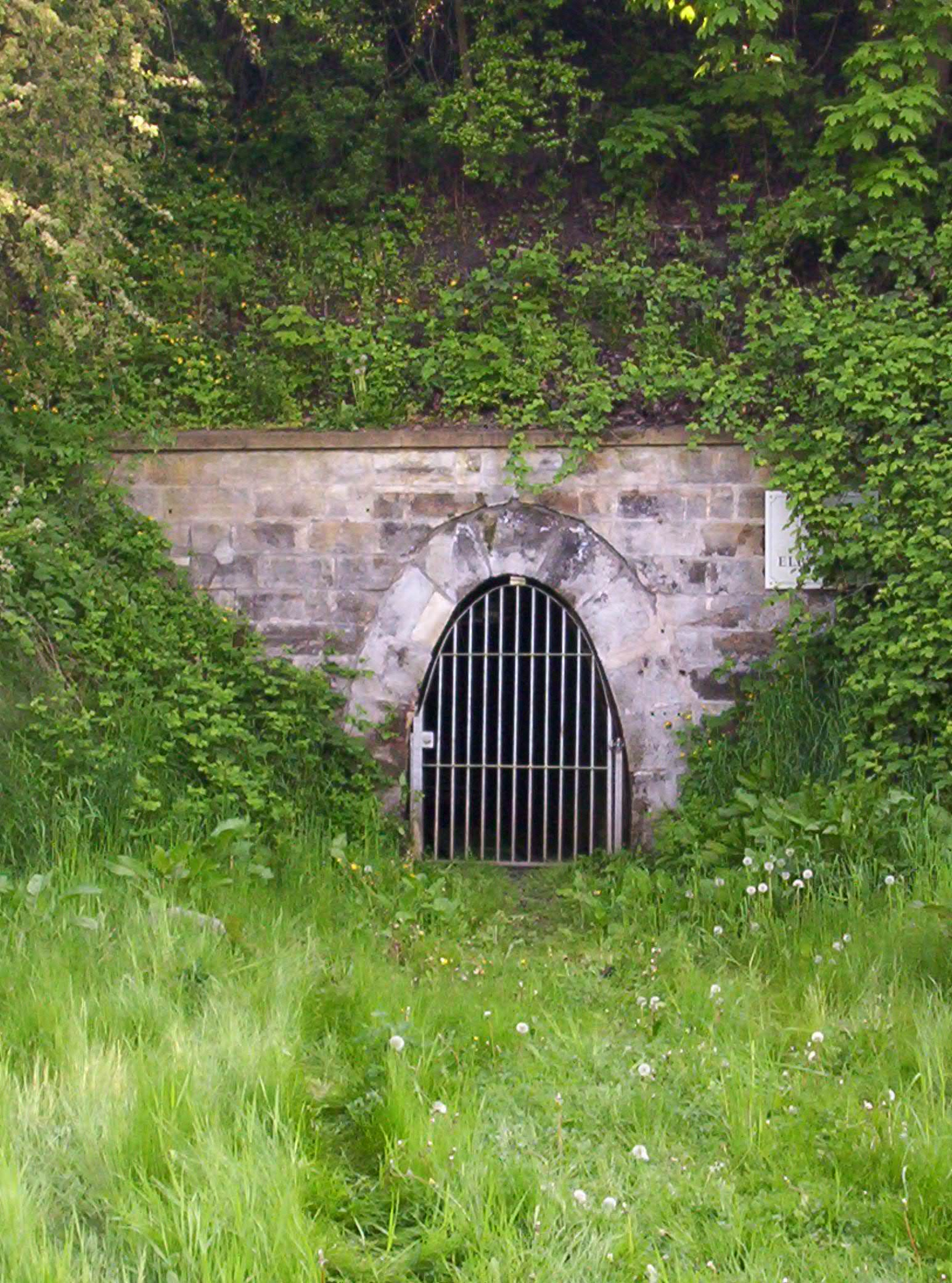
Mouth of the deep Elbe adit on the Cotta Elbufer

The Tiefen Elbstolln, an underground tunnel excavated between 1817 and 1837 to drain coal shafts in Freital, has its mouth located where the Berlin-Dresden railway line meets the banks of the Elbe river. Within Cottaer Flur, four of the tunnel's nine light shafts, which served as access for repairs and fresh air supply, can be found. One of these light shafts is located in the basement of the former Hofbrauhaus, while another can be found on the property at Gottfried-Keller-Straße 35. A narrow path leads from Meißner Landstraße down to the tunnel's mouth, located between the demolished Hofbrauhaus and the former Junge Generation theater. A plaque commemorating the tunnel's construction was installed at the site in 1954.

=== Former Structures ===
==== Hebbelbad ====
The Hebbelbad, originally built in 1899 as an indoor swimming pool, was located at Hebbelstraße 11. It was initially constructed as a swimming facility for the working class of Cotta, providing one of the few opportunities for personal hygiene. The city of Dresden took over the Hebbelbad in 1922 and later modernized it in 1929. In the post-war years, it remained one of the few usable indoor swimming pools in Dresden, along with Sachsenbad in Pieschen and Nordbad in the Äußere Neustadt. However, with the opening of new swimming pools in Wilsdruffer and Pirnaische Vorstadt in 1969, the Hebbelbad gradually fell into disrepair and was eventually closed in the 1980s. The facility then remained empty as a ruin until its demolition in February 2011.

==== Hofbrauhaus ====
Built in 1872 on Hamburger Straße next to the old Junge Generation theater, the Hofbrauhaus was a large brewery measuring 120 meters in length. It was among the 100 largest breweries in the German Empire with a total output of 117,000 hectoliters in 1913. However, due to the shortage of raw materials after World War I and the fierce competition in the Dresden beer market, the brewery was discontinued in 1921. The brewery was subsequently used by Ludwig Hupfeld AG, a pipe and fittings factory during the Third Reich, and VEB Chemiehandel Dresden after World War II. Between 1992 and 2008, the partially listed former Hofbrauhaus was gradually demolished. A supermarket now stands on the site, and the Hofbrauhaus fountain can still be seen inside.

==== Cotta power plant ====
A dedicated coal-fired power plant was operational on Bahnstraße in Cotta from 1894, providing heat and electricity to several public buildings and various railroad-operating buildings. After its destruction in 1945, it was rebuilt and restarted in 1954 and continued to operate until its eventual shutdown in 1992. .

==== Cobbler's House ====
Around 1890, the Schusterhaus was built on Hamburger Straße, which served as a large ballroom similar to the Constantia. However, after the confluence of the Weißeritz estuary into the Elbe was positioned next to the Schusterhaus in 1893, a severe flood of the Erzgebirge River occurred on July 31, 1897, leading to the building's destruction. It was subsequently rebuilt in the neo-Baroque style, with a new hall that could accommodate 2000 people. It remained an event space until it was converted for military use in 1940. Unfortunately, in March 1945, the Schusterhaus was completely destroyed during an air raid, and its ruins were subsequently removed in the 1950s.

=== Sport ===
==== Outdoor pool Cotta ====
The Luftbad Cotta, also known as Hebbelbad, located at Hebbelstraße 33, was established in 1908 through the efforts of Naturheilverein Cotta. The open-air pool was later acquired by the city of Dresden in 1946. In 2003, a citizens' initiative was established to preserve the facility, and a new operating company took over in 2004, thus preventing the planned closure.

At the end of the 2011 season, the bath was closed and underwent a complete renovation that cost 2.5 million euros. It reopened on July 13, 2013, boasting a 620-square-meter stainless steel swimming pool with three 25-meter lanes, a 70-square-meter paddling pool, a 16-meter wide slide, a three-meter tower, a one-meter diving board, and a water mushroom.

==== Sports field Hebbelstraße ====
Around 1910, the Hebbelstraße sports field was built next to the outdoor pool and was used by several sports clubs in Cotta. Heinz Schwipps is one of the famous footballers who learned to play soccer here. Since 1949, the Postsportverein Dresden, formerly BSG Post Dresden, has been the primary user of the field. The sportsmen's home was constructed in 1960. From 1998 to 2006, the existing facilities underwent extensive renovations and were transformed into an artificial turf pitch.

==== Boathouses Cotta ====
Below the confluence of the Weißeritz with the Elbe (at Elbe kilometer 61.8) there are 2 boathouses:

- The club domicile of the Dresden Rowing Club with Olympic and state rowing bases.
- The boathouse of the canoeing department of the Eisenbahner Sportverein Dresden.

== Economy and infrastructure ==
=== Economy ===
In 2006, the number of companies in Cotta was 311, with nearly half of them belonging to the service sector. Of these, 20 companies had more than ten employees, and four of them had a workforce of over 100 employees.

In Cotta, there are 922 residential buildings with more than 6500 apartments. However, the district's vacancy rate of 21% is higher than the average of 12.8% for the city. The unemployment rate in the area stands at 13%, slightly lower than the average rate for Dresden.

=== Traffic ===
==== Private transport ====
At the border between Cotta and Friedrichstadt, two major road axes of Dresden intersect.

One of them is Hamburger Straße, which was first mentioned in 1437 as Breßnitzer Straße. It runs in an east–west direction and is the most important connection between Dresden and Meissen. The road follows the valley on the left bank of the Elbe River and is also part of the B 6 route. Further to the northwest of Dresden, the road continues under the name Meißner Landstraße, reaching destinations such as Cossebaude village and the freeway junction Dresden-Altstadt on the A 4 in Kemnitz.

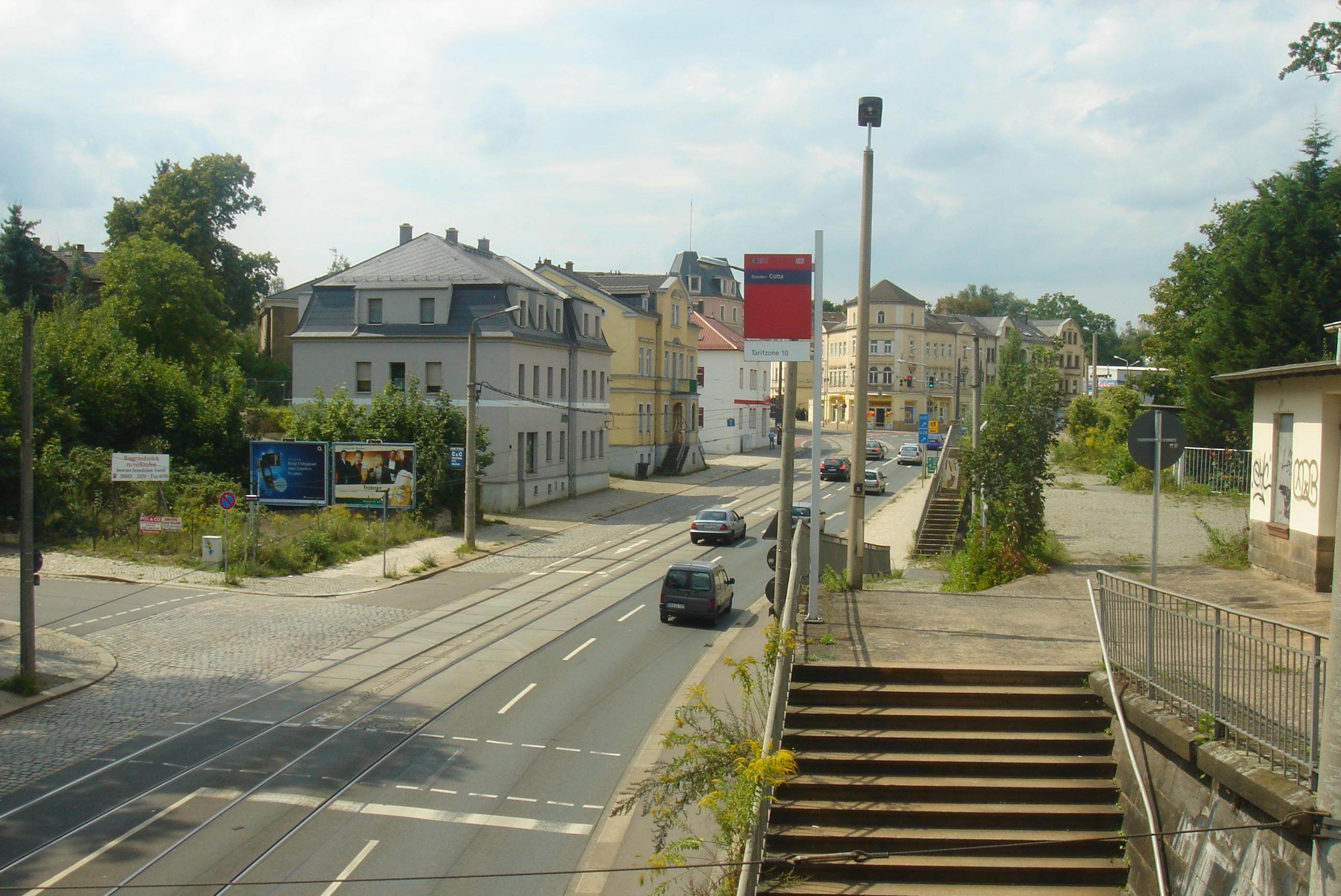
View of Hamburger Strasse from Dresden-Cotta station

In order to accommodate modern traffic needs, the city center bypass has been extended to the west. This extension, known as the Outer City Ring, starts at the Dresden-Neustadt freeway junction in Kaditz on the opposite side of the Elbe. From there, it passes through Washingtonstraße in Mickten and crosses the Flügelweg bridge, before intersecting with the B 6 at a part-height-free intersection. The Outer City Ring then proceeds through the historic Cotta town center, running in a north–south direction. After passing through Cotta, it follows Emerich-Ambros-Ufer and crosses the Nossener bridge, ultimately heading southeast towards Südvorstadt.

Cotta has other significant roads originating from it, such as Warthaer Straße leading towards Podemus and Ockerwitz, Rudolf-Renner-Straße towards Löbtau, and Steinbacher Straße towards Gompitz in the south of the district.

In Cotta, there are a total of 4,381 registered motor vehicles, which corresponds to 527 per 1,000 adult inhabitants. On average, there are 700 private cars per 1,000 households, with motorcycles comprising 4% of the total vehicles.

==== Public transport ====
The Berlin-Dresden railroad line runs to the north of Cotta. The Dresden-Cotta station on Hamburger Straße provides a connection to the RB31 train line that runs via Coswig and Großenhain to Elsterwerda. Just east of the district, the railroad facilities expand to form the Friedrichstadt marshaling yard.

Cotta is served by three streetcar and four bus lines operated by Dresden public transport company. Streetcar lines 1 and 12 starts to the west in Leutewitz and run directly via Hamburger Straße or via a detour through Löbtau to Postplatz in the city center. Streetcar line 2, which starts in Gorbitz in the southwest, connects the southern part of Cotta with Hebbelplatz and intersects with line 12 at Pennricher Straße.

The city bus line 68, which runs from Cossebaude through Postplatz to Leubnitzerhöhe/Goppeln, runs together with the streetcar along Hamburger Straße. Lines 70 and 80 runs through the district via the outer ring road and Grillparzerstraße. Line 92 connects Gottfried-Keller-Straße in Cotta with Ockerwitz.

There are a total of nine bus and 20 tram stops in the district so more than 97% of the population of Cotta can easily reach the stops. The fastest connection to downtown Dresden is line 1, which takes 10 minutes.

=== Public facilities ===
The Cotta City Hall serves as the headquarters of the Cotta City District Office, thereby fulfilling a central role in the city district of the same name. This district covers extensive areas of the western region of Dresden, with approximately 65,000 residents.

The district is home to the leading institution of the so-called Library Network West of Dresden's municipal libraries, namely the Cotta Library.

=== Education ===
The first Cotta school was established in 1869 and underwent several expansions before the municipality built another school building in 1897 at Hebbelstraße 20. The brick façade of the building was made of clinker and was called "Red School," while its official name during the GDR era was the 12th elementary school, later renamed POS Arthur Weineck. After reunification, the building was divided into a middle school and an elementary school, but since the 12th middle school's closure in 2003, only the 12th elementary school remains.

The Dresden-Cotta Gymnasium, the largest elementary school in Saxony at the time, was constructed around 1910 under the supervision of city architect Hans Erlwein. It was designed to accommodate more than 3,000 students and is commonly referred to as the Rübezahl school due to a painting on its façade. The building was severely damaged during the war and underwent restoration before housing the Dresden-West District School and later the POS Ernst Moritz Arndt during the GDR era. It became a grammar school after 1990.

== Personalities ==
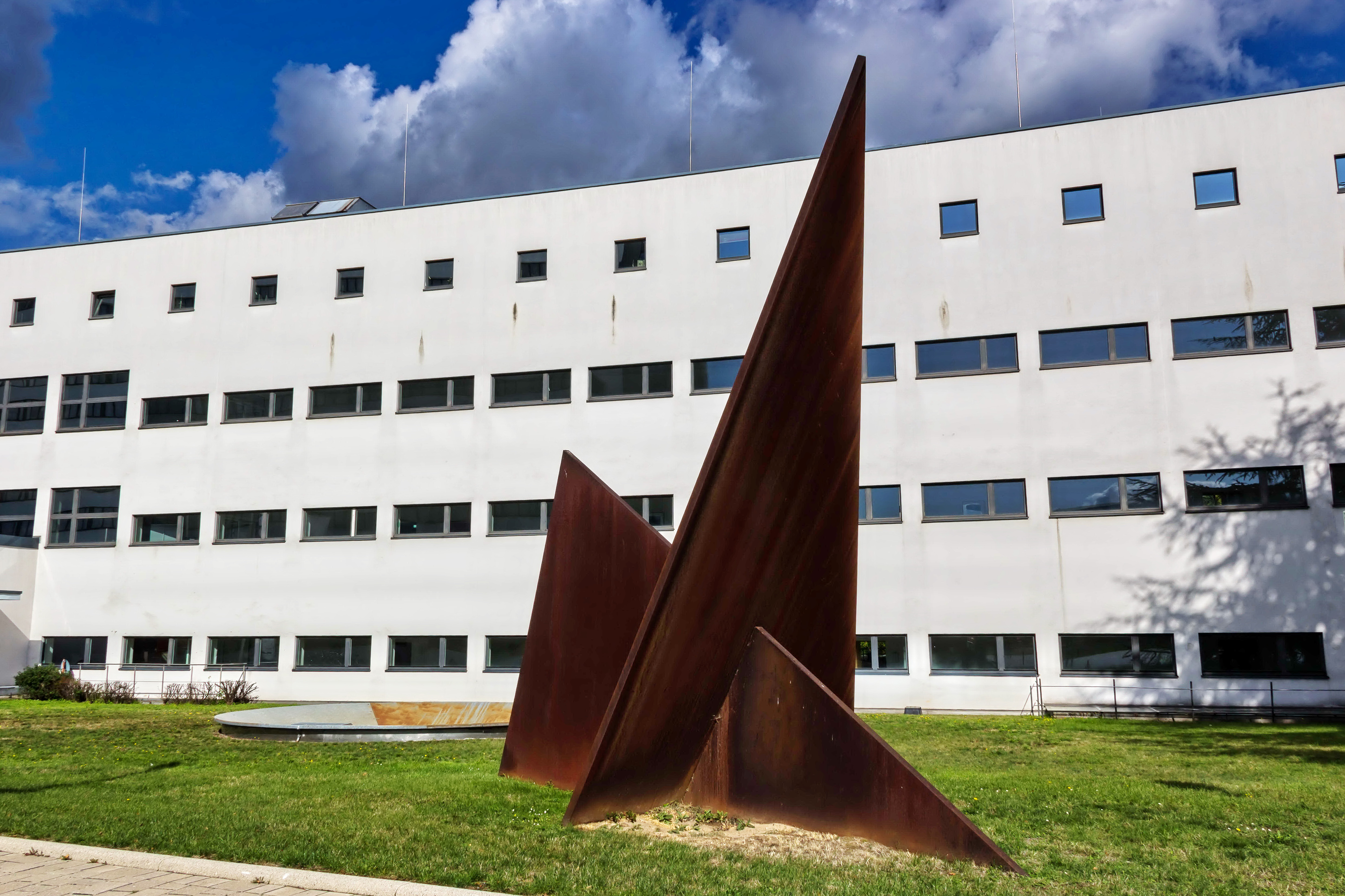
Sculpture by Hermann Glöckner in front of the Federal Palace in Bonn

The former municipality and today's district of Cotta are closely associated with several personalities from Dresden. Hermann Glöckner (1889-1987), a Constructivist painter and sculptor, as well as naval officer Ernst Wolf (1886-1964) and javelin thrower Luise Krüger (1915-2001), who won the silver medal for the German Reich at the 1936 Summer Olympics in Berlin, were all born here.

Footballer Heinz Schwipps (1915-2006) played and coached for several Cotta teams during his career. Soprano Elfride Trötschel (1913-1958) grew up in Cotta, and Richard Partzsch (1881-1953), who later became a member of the Reichstag, led the Dresden-Cotta SPD local association in the years preceding the First World War. The politician Rudolf Renner (1894-1940), a co-founder of the KPD, resided at Hühndorfer Straße 1 in the southern part of Cotta until he was arrested by the National Socialists in April 1933.

Wilhelm Franz (1819-1903) is one of the district's honorary citizens due to his outstanding contributions to the development of Cotta during the period of strong growth in the 19th century when he served as the head of the municipality. The street in the south of Cotta, Wilhelm-Franz-Straße, was named after him in 1901, while he was still alive. Both Wilhelm Franz and Elfride Trötschel were buried in the Cotta cemetery after their deaths.

== See also ==
- Friedrichstadt (Dresden)
- Dresden-Cotta railway station
