= Hanshäger Bach =

River in Germany

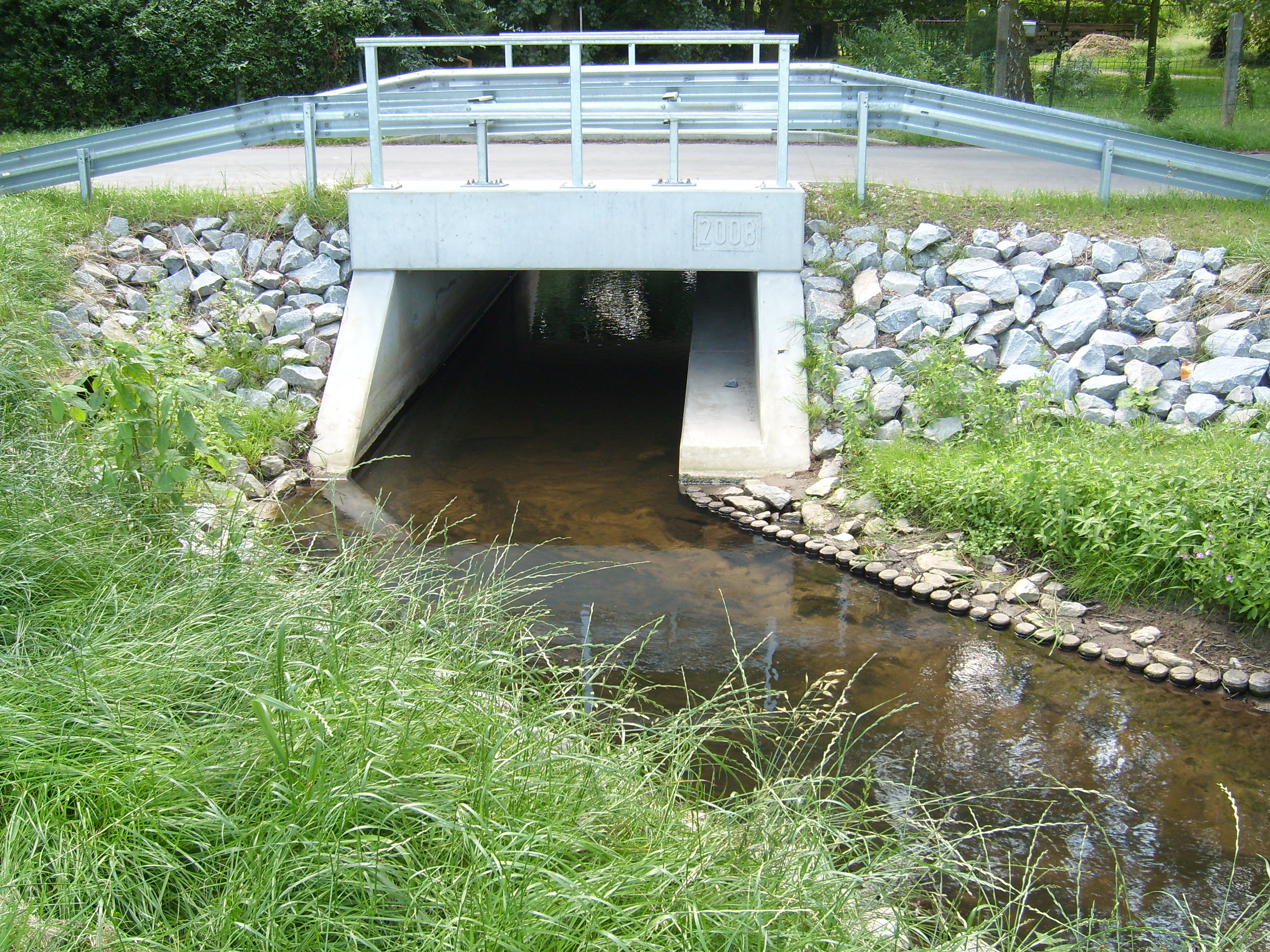

Location
- Country: Germany
- States: Mecklenburg-Vorpommern

Physical characteristics
- Mouth
  - location: Ziese
  - coordinates: 54.0837°N 13.5279°E

Basin features
- Progression: Ziese→ Baltic Sea

Hanshäger Bach is a river of Mecklenburg-Vorpommern, Germany. It flows into the Ziese near Kemnitz.

== See also ==
- List of rivers of Mecklenburg-Vorpommern
