= Löbtau =

- Quarter of Dresden
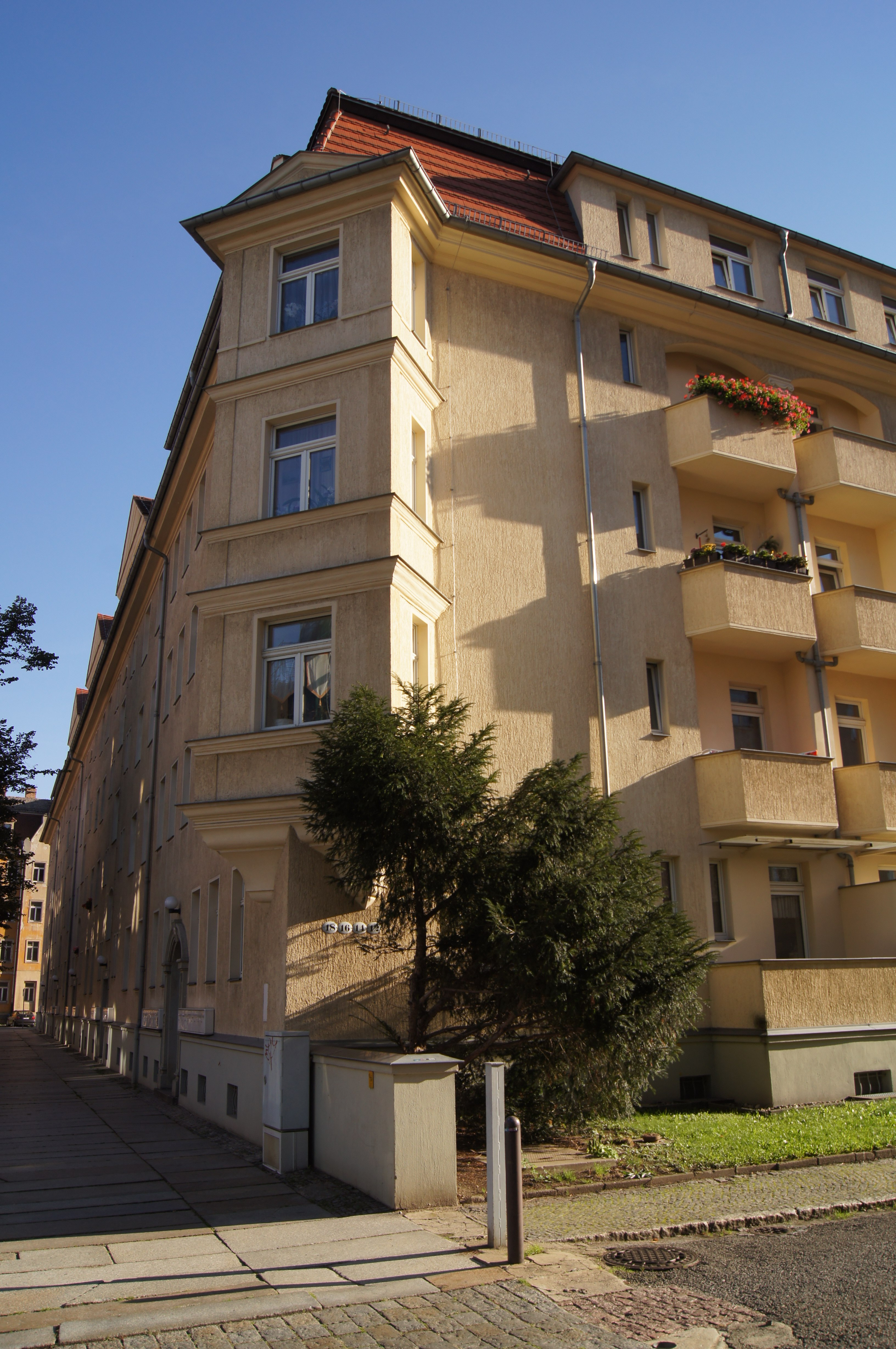
- Saxonia st. 18-28, Löbtau, built in 1920-1922.

- Location of Löbtau in Dresden
- Interactive map of Löbtau
- Location within Germany Location within Saxony
- Coordinates: 51°02′34″N 13°41′5″E
- Country: Germany
- State: Saxony
- District: Urban district
- Town: Dresden
- Borough: Cotta

Area
  - Total: 2.34 km^{2} (0.90 sq mi)
- Elevation: 112 m (367 ft)

Population (2020-12-31)
  - Total: 21,205
  - Density: 9,060/km^{2} (23,500/sq mi)
- Time zone: UTC+01:00 (CET)
  - Summer (DST): UTC+02:00 (CEST)
- Postal codes: 01159
- Dialling codes: 0351
- Website: www.dresden.de

Löbtau (German pronunciation: [ˈlœptaʊ]) is a quarter or Stadtteil in south-west Dresden, Germany. It is part of the Stadtbezirk Cotta. It borders the quarters of Friedrichstadt, Cotta, Gorbitz, Naußlitz, Dolzschen, Plauen and Südvorstadt.

== History ==
First mentioned in 1068 Löbtau has found a "Liubituwa" ("lovely meadow"), as the German King Henry IV missed two hooves from his collection to the diocese of Meissen. Löbtau it one of the oldest recorded settlements in the Elbe Valley. Its history dates back probably to the time of the Sorbs.

The place was under the Meissen Cathedral Chapter, but was passed in the wake of the Reformation in the Electorate of Saxony.

In the 19th Century attacked the growth of the neighboring city of Dresden to the suburbs; Löbtau counted in 1834 only 163 inhabitants, its population multiplied in the coming decades - Löbtau became the biggest country town in Saxony. In 1875, the New Anne Cemetery was established in 1881 Löbtau horse tram was connected to Dresden in 1900, the track was electrified. In the village there were several along the millrace Weißeritz Mühlwerke.

Early 20th Löbtau century was a factory worker and suburban, mostly with closed development. On 1 January 1903 [1], it was incorporated with a population of about 39,000 in Dresden.

During World War II Löbtau was damaged in 1944 and 1945, when the railway facilities were attacked (Dresden-Friedrichstadt and Wilsdruffer Vorstadt / coal train station), and some streets were partially destroyed. February 1945 was the largely intact Löbtau with Kesselsdorfer road to major business center in the west of the city. During the communist era, the area fell into disrepair, but noticeably. Some areas were not rebuilt and left to decay. Only after the reunification of Germany in 1990 extensive renovations had been carried out.

== Transport ==
Löbtau is connected by tram lines 2, 6, 7 and 12 and buses 61, 62, 63, 85 and 90 of the Dresden Transport with the Dresden city center and other parts of the city; also operate regional buses for regional transportation Dresden towards Freital (line A) and Kesselsdorf - Wilsdruff - Mohorn (line 333). Are also close to the train stations Dresden-Plauen and Freiberger Street (since 2004) and served only by regional rail station in Dresden-Friedrichstadt.
