= Ziese =

River in Germany

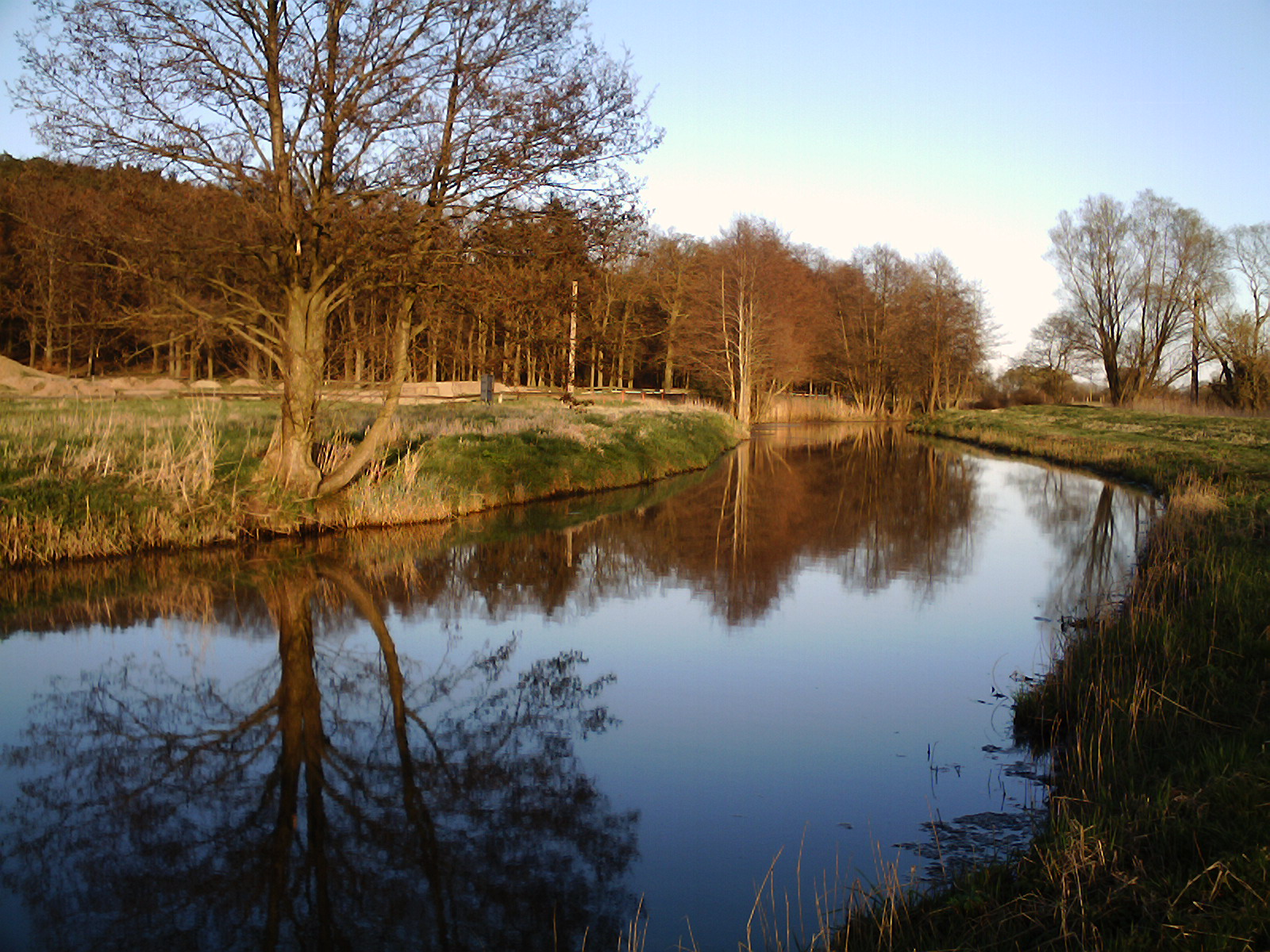

Location
- Country: Germany
- State: Mecklenburg-Vorpommern

Physical characteristics
- Mouth
  - location: Dänische Wiek and Peenestrom
  - coordinates: 54.0879°N 13.5008°E and 54.0320°N 13.7433°E

Basin features
- Tributaries
  - left: Hanshäger Bach

Ziese is a river of Mecklenburg-Vorpommern, Germany. It forms a pseudobifurcation: its water west of Rappenhagen flows into the Dänische Wiek near Greifswald, and its water east of Rappenhagen flows into the Peenestrom near Wolgast.

== See also ==
- List of rivers of Mecklenburg-Vorpommern
