= Gorbitz =

- Stadtteil of Dresden
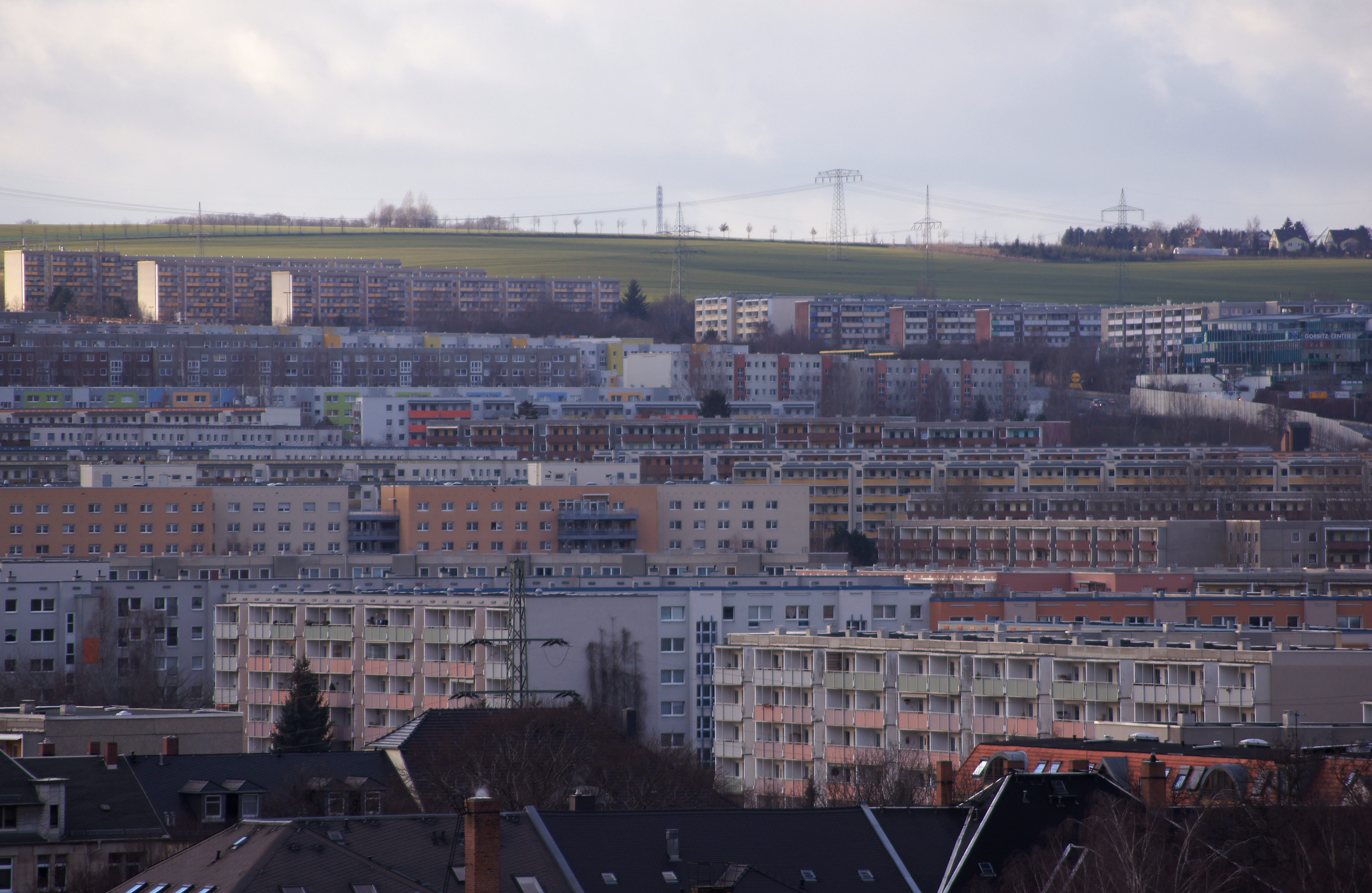
- Overview of Gorbitz, January 2012

- Location of Gorbitz in Dresden
- Interactive map of Gorbitz
- Location within Germany Location within Saxony
- Coordinates: 51°02′44″N 13°40′12″E
- Country: Germany
- State: Saxony
- District: Urban district
- Town: Dresden
- Borough: Cotta

Area
  - Total: 2.83 km^{2} (1.09 sq mi)

Population (2020-12-31)
  - Total: 21,599
  - Density: 7,630/km^{2} (19,800/sq mi)
- Time zone: UTC+01:00 (CET)
  - Summer (DST): UTC+02:00 (CEST)
- Postal codes: 01169
- Dialling codes: 0351
- Website: www.dresden.de

Gorbitz (German pronunciation: [ˈɡɔʁbɪts]) is an area in south-west Dresden, Germany. It is part of the Stadtbezirk Cotta, and is subdivided into three Stadtteile: Gorbitz-Nord/Neu-Omsewitz, Gorbitz-Ost and Gorbitz-Sud.

Gorbitz is the largest Plattenbau area of Dresden, but still smaller than large Plattenbau-settlements like Grunau quarter in Leipzig and planned city of Halle-Neustadt.

== Location ==
Gorbitz is a plateau with considerable altitude 213–130 m above sea level. In the west it is bordered by unincorporated Altfranken and Gompitz, north of Omsewitz, Leutewitz and Cotta. In the east it borders districts of Wölfnitz, Naußlitz and Löbtau, and south of the district Roßthal.

== History ==
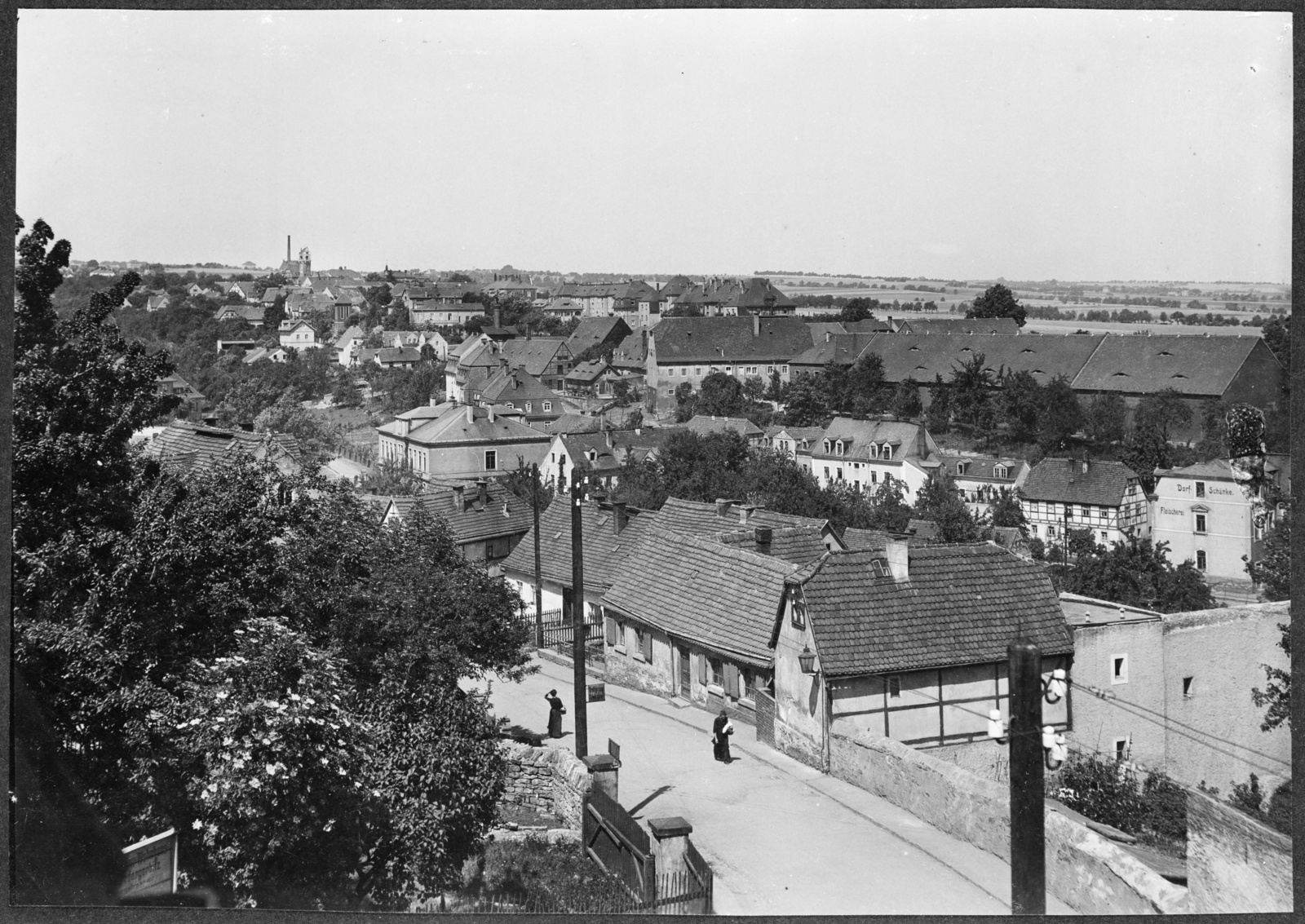
Early 20th-century view

The site of Altgorbitz is characterized by narrow streets with old buildings and is one of the historic village centers in Dresden. From the development area is separated by the Gorbitz Kesselsdorfer road and is therefore south of the large settlement.

Old Gorbitz arose from a Sorbian settlement. The village stretches along the valley of the "Gorbitz Bach", which later culminated in the White Cotta Ritz. In 1733, the settlement was granted to Aleksander Józef Sułkowski by Augustus III of Poland. It was divided into Upper and Lower Gorbitz up for annexation to Dresden in 1921 formed two communities. Since the membership of Dresden is only spoken of (old) Gorbitz.

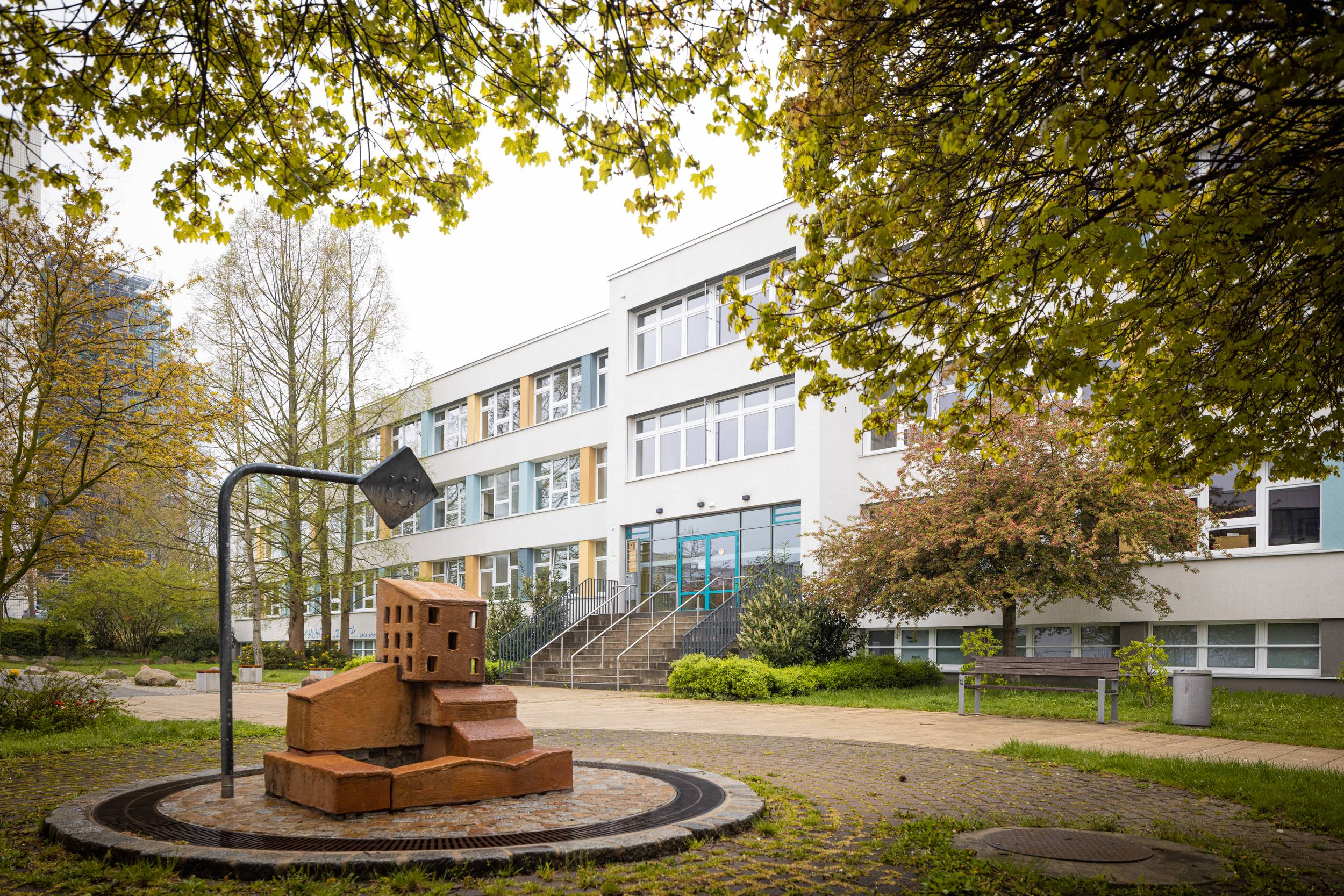
Grundschule am Amalie-Dietrich-Platz

Upper Gorbitz contributes to the present the typical shape of a circular compact, while Lower Gorbitz distributed around the Old Gorbitz mentioned place, but resembles more of a road through the valley village.

== Transportation ==
Gorbitz runs through the four-lane highway in part 173, which was recently expanded to the feeder road. It connects the southwestern part of the city with the motorway junction "Gorbitz" at the 17th Highway.

Gorbitz is the location of the largest of the Dresden tram depot. Scheduled traffic Gorbitz is accessed regularly for three tram lines (2 Kleinzschachwitz - Gorbitz, 6 Gorbitz - Niedersedlitz, 7 Weixdorf – Pennrich), serving eight stops.
