= Omsewitz =

- Stadtteil of Dresden
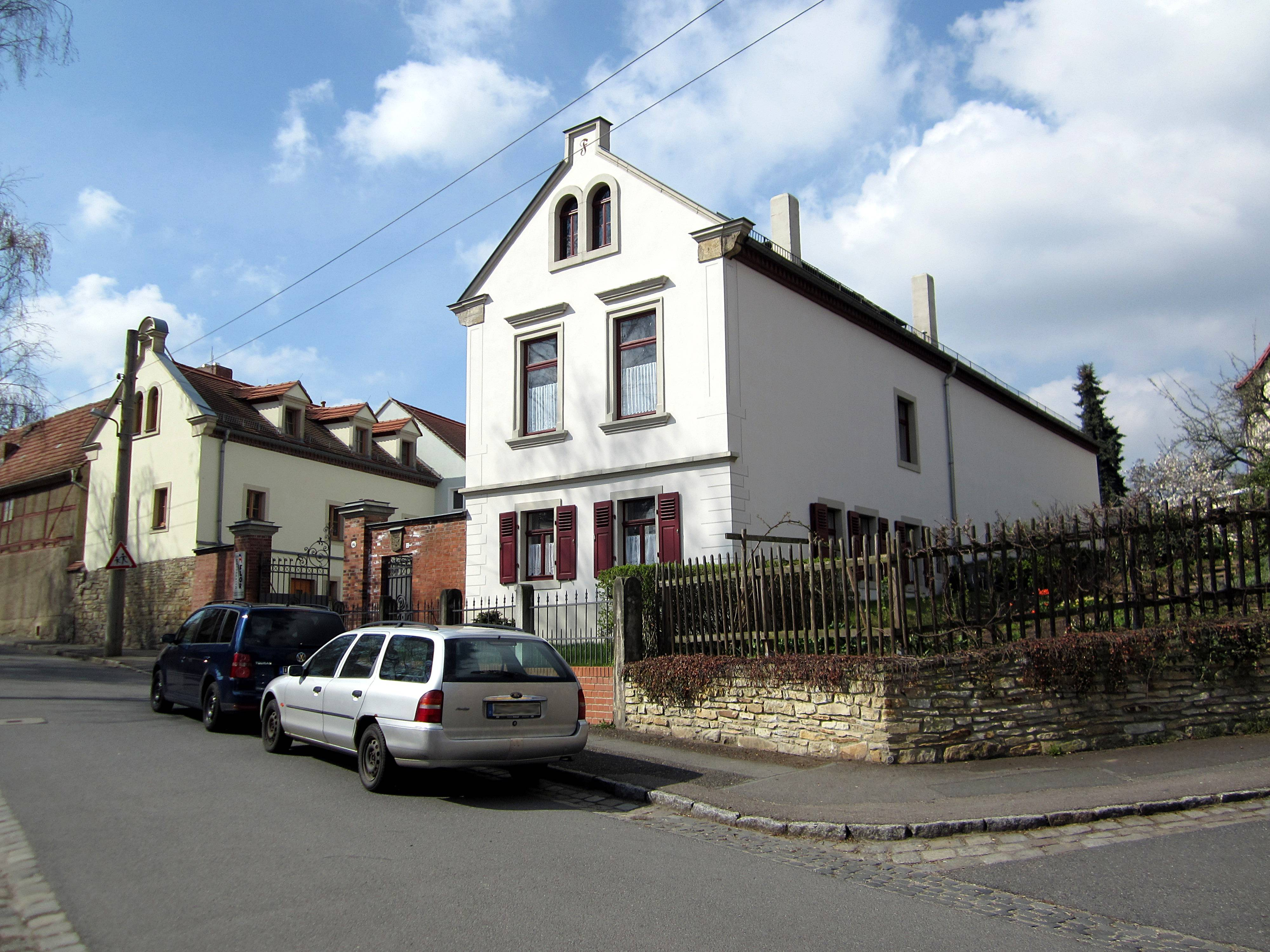
- Omsewitz in 2012

- Location of Omsewitz within Dresden
- Interactive map of Omsewitz
- Location within Germany Location within Saxony
- Coordinates: 51°03′17″N 13°39′38″E
- Country: Germany
- State: Saxony
- District: Urban district
- Town: Dresden
- Borough: Cotta
- Elevation: 0,351 m (1,152 ft)
- Time zone: UTC+01:00 (CET)
  - Summer (DST): UTC+02:00 (CEST)
- Postal codes: 01157
- Dialling codes: 0351
- Website: http://www.dresden.de

Omsewitz (German pronunciation: [ˈɔmzəvɪts]) is a quarter or Stadtteil in south-west Dresden, Germany. It is part of the Stadtbezirk Cotta.

== History ==
First known mentioning of Omsewitz is from 1317 as Omasuwicz (old Sorbian: People of Omaz) when the archdeacon of Nisan the Meissen Cathedral donated a manor in the village. Burgstädtels mention followed about 200 years later in the documents, namely 1511 Borckstadtel.

For centuries Omsewitz belonged to the Meissen Cathedral Chapter. It was not until 1559, came to office in Dresden.

After the First World War a large housing development was created in Omsewitz. Also some larger villas were built.

In June 1992 the historic village core was approved by the Dresden City Council as preservation statute.
