= Friedrichstadt (Dresden) =

Neighborhood in Dresden, Germany

Coordinates: 51°3′33.2″N 13°42′51.57″E

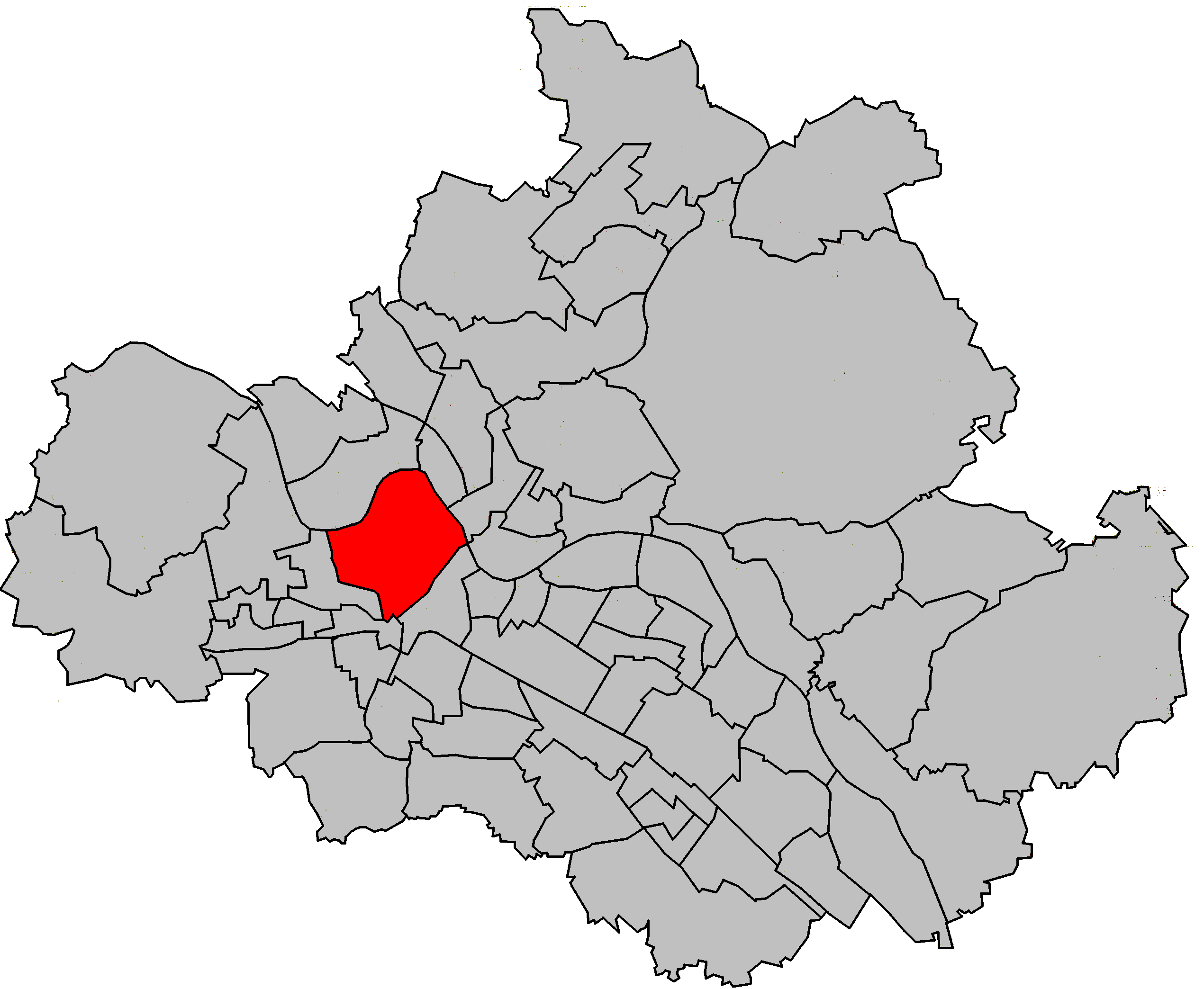
Friedrichstadt within Dresden

Friedrichstadt (German pronunciation: [ˈfʁiːdʁɪçˌʃtat]) is a neighborhood in central Dresden, Germany. A factory district in the late 19th and early 20th centuries, it is known as the home of the founders of the artistic association known as Die Brücke. Its population is 9,887 (2020).

== History ==
Map of Friedrichstadt (around 1760)

Once known as Ostra, a Sorbian village going back to the year 1206, it was then turned into a manor farm for the elector's residence in Dresden. Augustus II the Strong of Saxony renamed the area Neustadt in 1730. This Neustadt should not be confused with the neighborhood in Dresden now known as Neustadt, then called Neue Königstadt. In 1731, the people of Neustadt again renamed their settlement, this time to Friedrichstadt after Augustus the Strong's son, future elector Frederick Augustus II, known in German as Friedrich August II.

After the dawn of the Industrial Revolution, the city declared Friedrichstadt a factory district in 1878. The plight of the factory workers in this area became a common theme in the works of the artists of Die Brücke, who set up a studio in a former cobbler's shop.

A good deal of the Friedrichstadt was destroyed in the bombing on 13–14 February 1945. Many of the neighborhood's attractions have been rebuilt since then.

Today Friedrichstadt is a mixed industrial, commercial, and residential neighborhood with almost 6,000 residents.

== Attractions ==
=== Yenidze ===
A former cigarette factory built in 1907, now office building and restaurant/biergarten with an excellent view of the Dresden skyline.

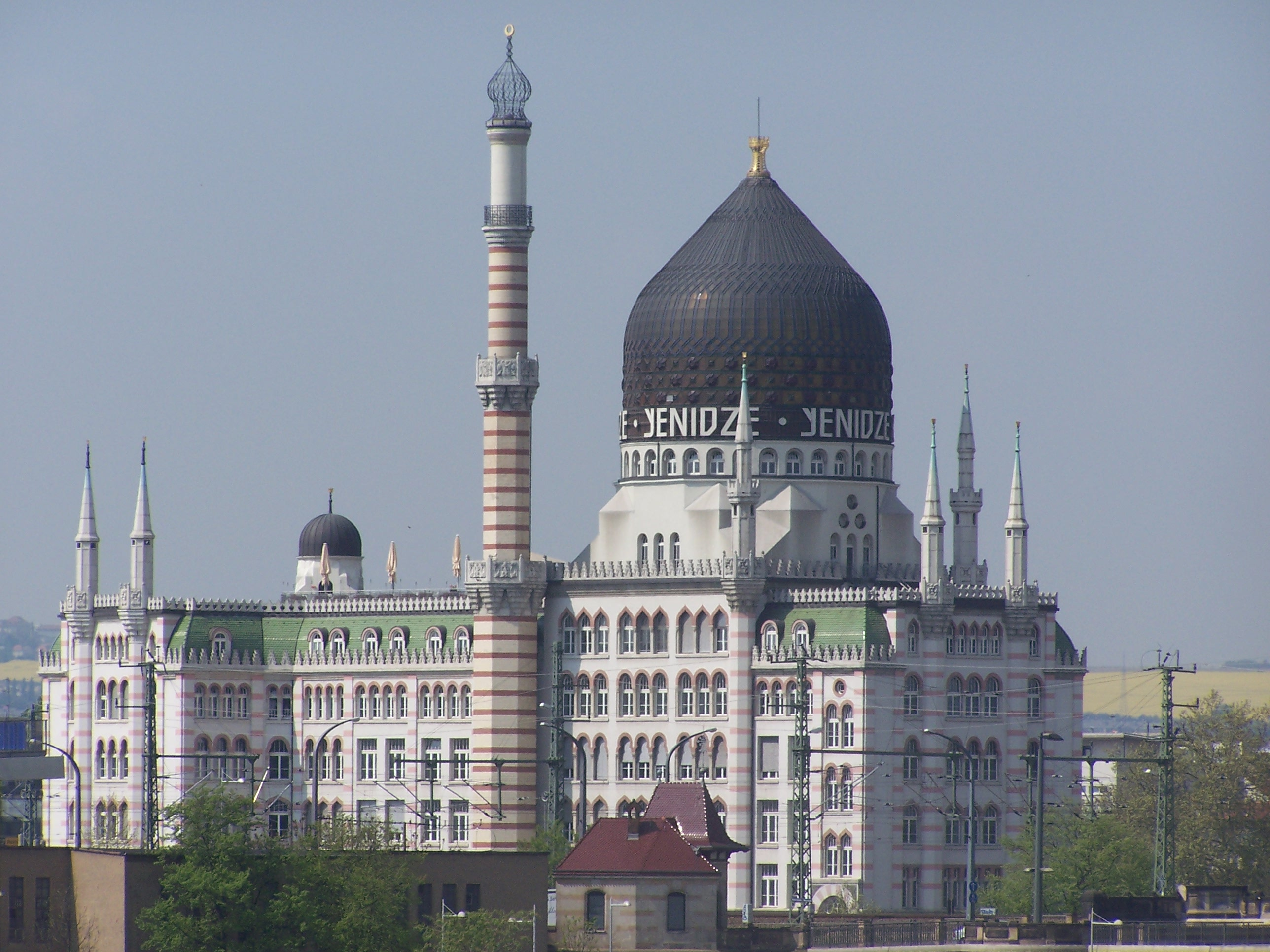
The Yenidze as seen from the other side of the river Elbe

=== Old Catholic cemetery ===
The oldest grave is from 1724. Contains notable baroque, roccoco, and neoclassical gravestones. The final resting place of many famous Dresdeners as well as a number of victims of the Nazis.

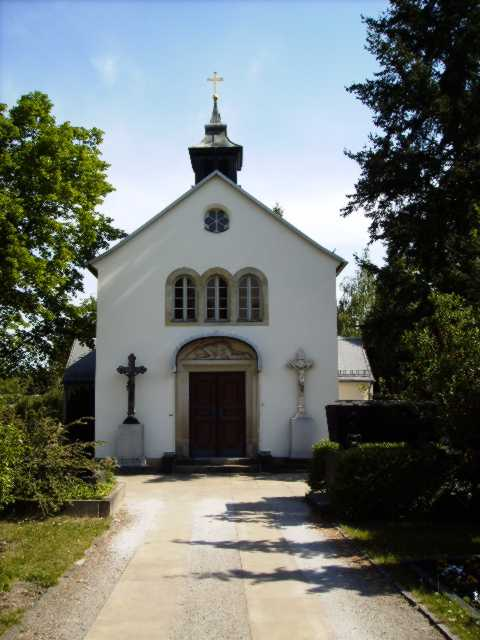
The chapel of the Catholic cemetery

=== Palais Brühl-Marcolini and the Fountain of Neptune ===
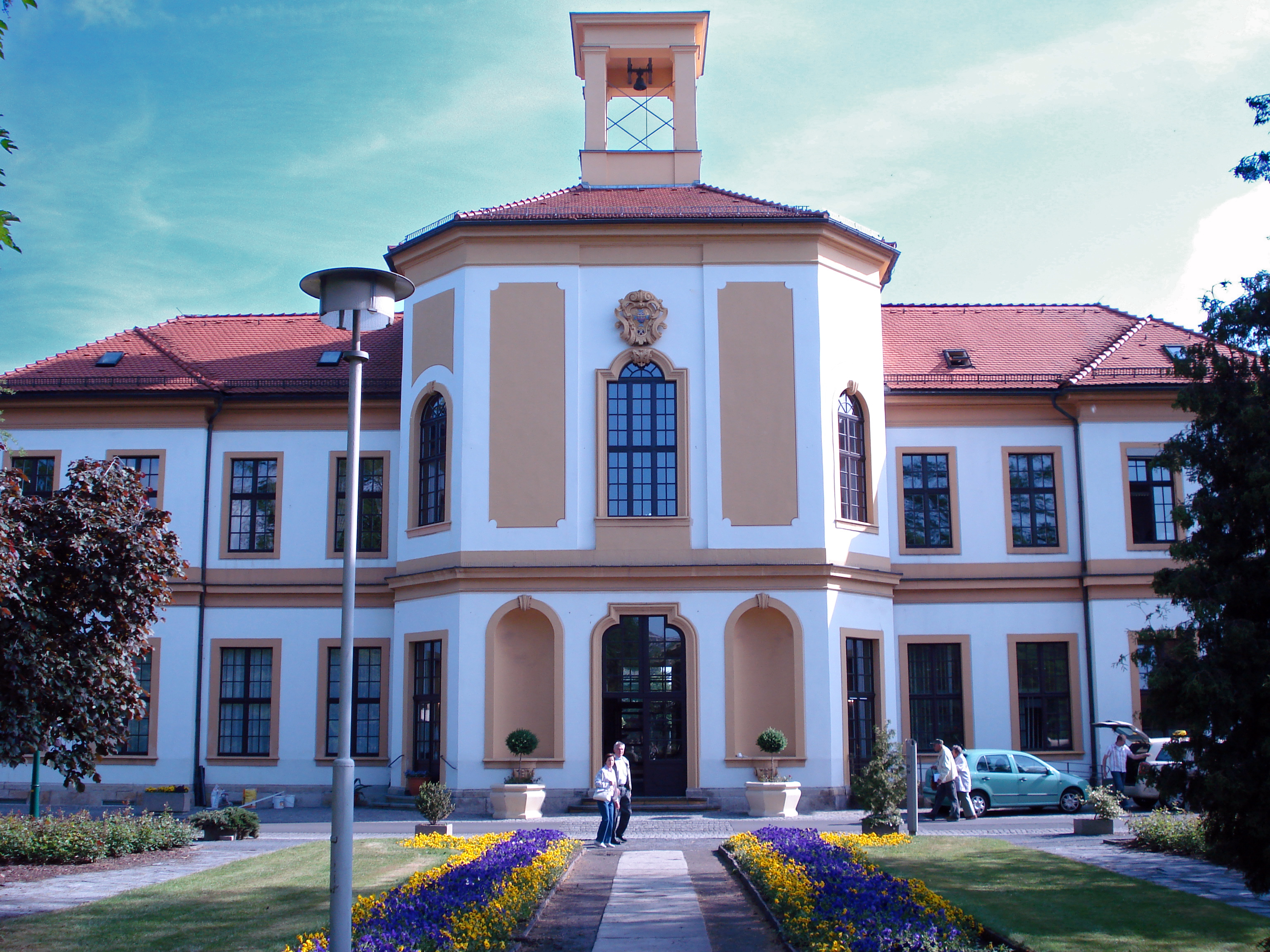
Palace exterior

Built in 1719 as the summer residence of Ursula Katharina of Altenbockum, this palace, which now houses the Friedrichstadt hospital, contains Chinese and Pompeii-style rooms as well as the neighborhood's most famous fountain, the Fountain of Neptune. Other notable residents included Count Heinrich von Brühl and Count Camillo Marcolini. Napoleon also briefly lived in the palace in 1813.

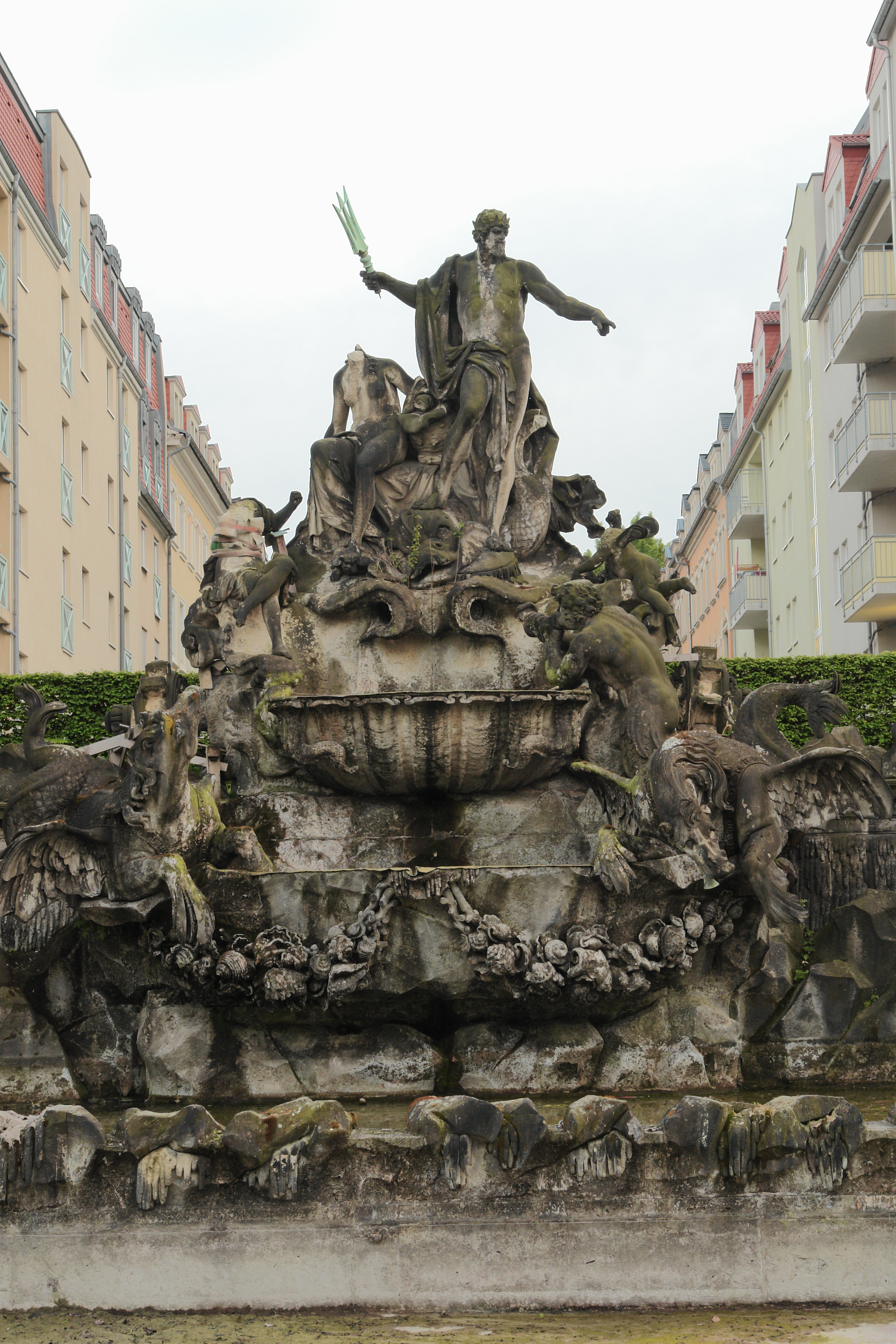
Fountain of Neptune

== Notable residents ==
- Paula Modersohn-Becker, German painter and most important representatives of early expressionism
- Caroline Friederike Friedrich (1749–1815), German painter
