= Kemnitz =

- Municipality
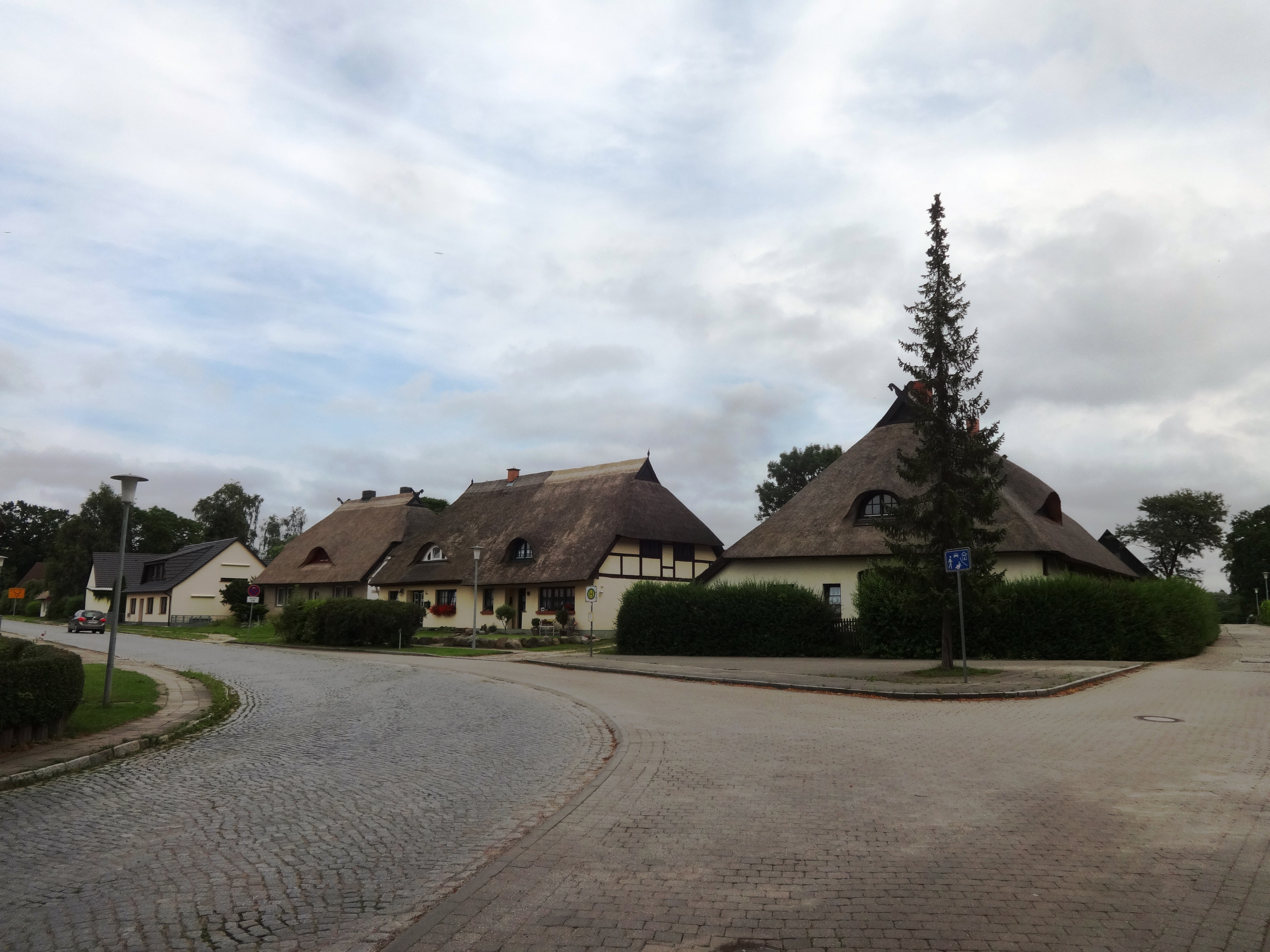
- Village street in Kemnitz

- Location of Kemnitz within Vorpommern-Greifswald district
- Interactive map of Kemnitz
- Location within Germany Location within Mecklenburg-Vorpommern
- Coordinates: 54°04′N 13°33′E
- Country: Germany
- State: Mecklenburg-Vorpommern
- District: Vorpommern-Greifswald
- Municipal assoc.: Lubmin
- Subdivisions: 6

Government
  - Mayor: Klaus Buchheister

Area
  - Total: 19.34 km^{2} (7.47 sq mi)
- Elevation: 20 m (66 ft)

Population (2025-12-31)
  - Total: 1,164
  - Density: 60.19/km^{2} (155.9/sq mi)
- Time zone: UTC+01:00 (CET)
  - Summer (DST): UTC+02:00 (CEST)
- Postal codes: 17509
- Dialling codes: 038352
- Vehicle registration: VG
- Website: www.amtlubmin.de

Kemnitz (German pronunciation: [ˈkɛmnɪts]) is a municipality in the Vorpommern-Greifswald district, in Mecklenburg-Vorpommern, Germany.
