= Dresden-Strehlen station =

Railway station in Dresden, Germany

Dresden Strehlen
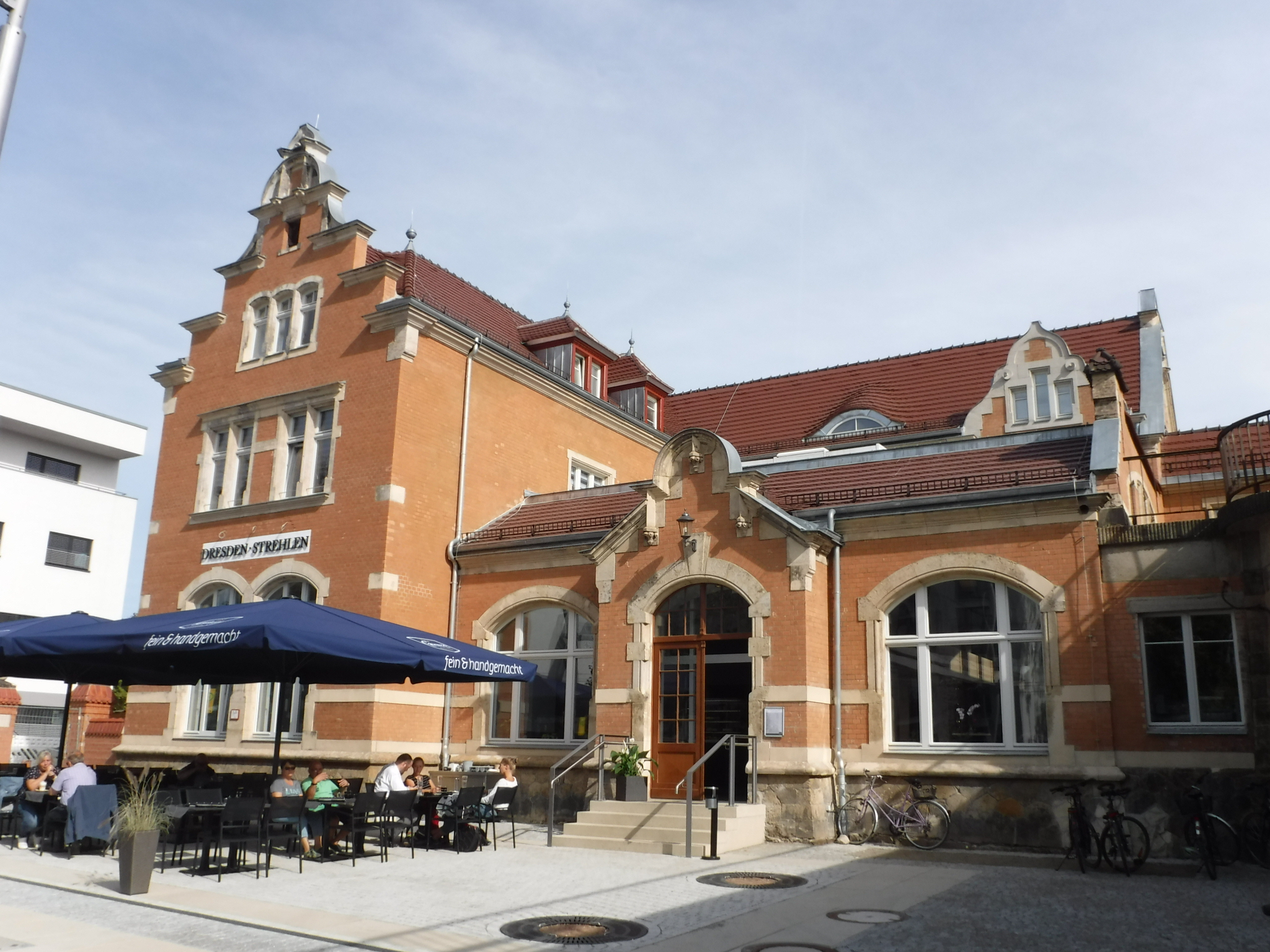
- Dresden-Strehlen following renovations in 2019

General information
- Location: Dresden, Saxony; Germany
- Coordinates: 51°1′50″N 13°45′42″E
- System: Haltepunkt
- Lines: Děčín hl.n.–Dresden-Neustadt (km 60.14); Pirna–Coswig (b Dresden) (km 14.612)
- Platforms: 1
- Tracks: 4

Other information
- Station code: 1357
- DS100 code: DSTH
- IBNR: 8011426
- Category: 5
- Website: www.bahnhof.de

History
- Opened: 3 July 1903
- Rebuilt: 2017–2019

Services
Preceding station	Dresden S-Bahn	Following station
Dresden Hbf towards Meißen Triebischtal	S 1	Dresden-Reick towards Schöna
Dresden Hbf towards Dresden Flughafen	S 2	Dresden-Reick towards Pirna
Preceding station	DB Regio Südost	Following station
Dresden Hbf Terminus	RE 19	Dresden-Reick towards Kurort Altenberg (Erzgebirge)
Dresden Hbf Terminus	RE 20	Dresden-Reick towards Litoměřice město
Location

Dresden-Strehlen (German: Haltepunkt Dresden-Strehlen) is a railway station located in the district of Strehlen in Dresden. Opening in 1903, the station serves Dresden S-Bahn and DB Regio Südost trains along with public transport from Dresdner Verkehrsbetriebe (DVB).

== History ==
Dresden-Strehlen railway station opened in 1903 to serve as a haltepunkt. The station's design was commissioned by Royal Saxon State Railways at a cost of 56,656 Marks. Architect and painter Bernhard Fellmann completed a watercolor of the station in 1980. Today, the painting is a part of Museum für Sächsische Volkskunst's collection located in Dresden. The station's building was bought by a consulting firm in 2017 and proceeded to refurbish the structure to house their IT professionals. The building also includes a restaurant, public transit facilities, and an event space.

As a part of the Stadtbahnprogrammn 2020 planned by DVB, the plan called for realignment of tram routes 9 and 13 to connect with railway services at Dresden-Strehlen. The plan was approved by Landesdirektion Sachsen in 2016. Construction on the project began in March 2017. The construction project overran its initial budget of 16.7 million euros to 24 million euros, a 44% increase. The realignment began operations in July 2019.
