= Geography and urban development of Dresden =

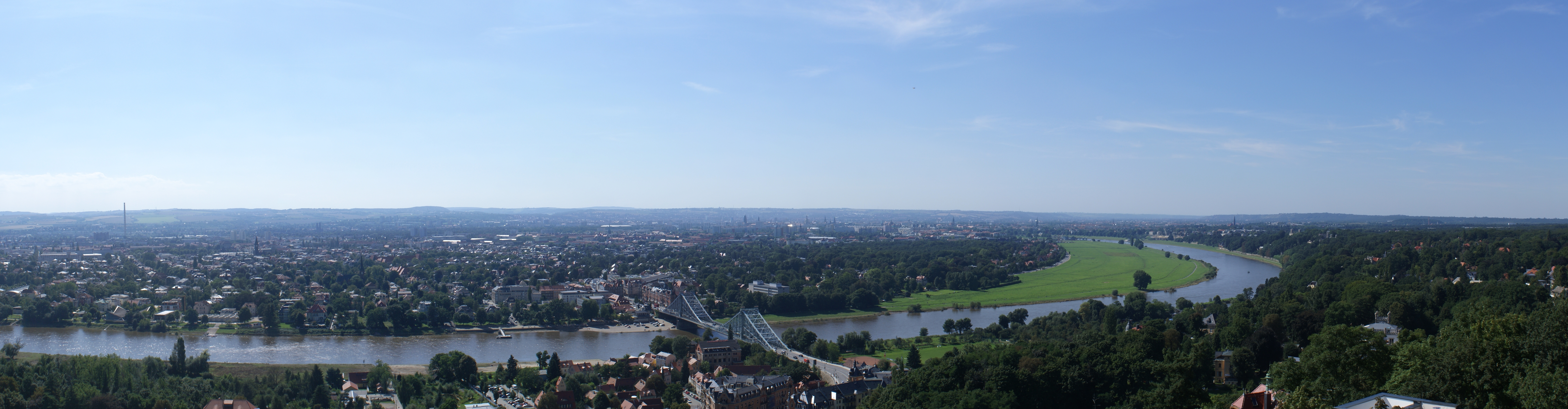
View from the Dresden Schwebebahn over Dresden Basin

Dresden is a large city in the eastern Saxony nearby the border to the Czech Republic at the river Elbe. The geography and urban development of Dresden is embossed by the valley location and by the Elbe stream.

== Geography ==
=== Location ===
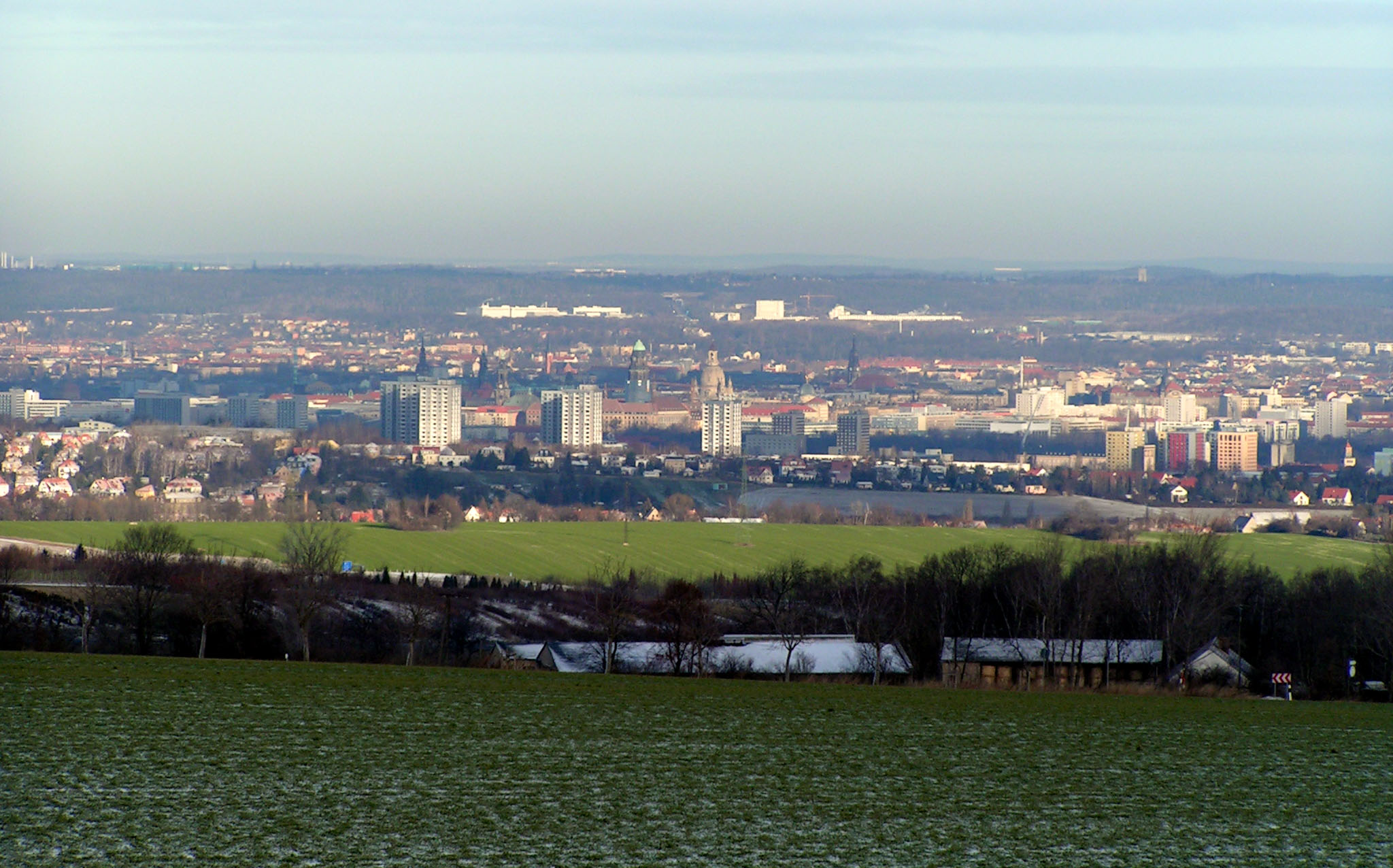
View over Dresden from the south-eastern slopes

Dresden lies on both banks of the river Elbe, mostly in the Dresden Basin, with the further reaches of the eastern Ore Mountains to the south, the steep slope of the Lusatian granitic crust to the north and the Elbe Sandstone Mountains to the east at an elevation of about 113 metres.

The northern parts of Dresden are in the West Lusatian Highlands (Westlausiter Berg- und Hügelland). The depth influx valleys and the higher areas in the south of Dresden characterise the change to the eastern foothills of the Ore Mountains. The Elbe valley basin is a part of the Saxon Elbe Landscape. The highest point of Dresden is the Triebenberg, at about 384 metres above sea level. With a pleasant location and a mild climate on the Elbe, as well as Mediterranean architecture, Dresden was given the sobriquet "Elbflorenz" ("Florence of the Elbe").

The incorporation of neighbouring rural communities over the past 60 years has made Dresden the fourth largest urban area in Germany after Berlin, Hamburg, and Cologne.

The most important river in Dresden is the Elbe river, the only navigable body of water to flow through the city. There are also a number of tributaries such as the river Weißeritz.

=== Surroundings ===
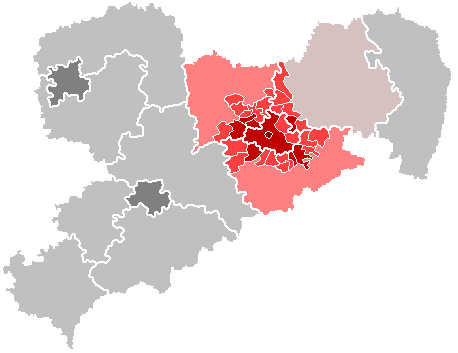
The Dresden conurbation in Saxony

The nearest German cities are Chemnitz (80 km to the southwest), Leipzig (100 km to the northwest) and Berlin (200 km to the north). The Czech capital Prague is about 150 km to the south; the Polish city of Wrocław is about 200 km to the east. There are some medium-sized towns such as Pirna (40,000 inhabitants), Freital (40,000), Radebeul (33,000 inhabitants) and Meißen (28,000 inhabitants) in the borough of Dresden. Riesa and Freiberg are not far away.

Greater Dresden, which spreads in the neighbouring districts of Kamenz, Meißen, Riesa-Großenhain, Sächsische Schweiz, Weißeritzkreis and in small parts in the district of Bautzen, has a population of around 1,250,000 inhabitants.

=== Nature ===
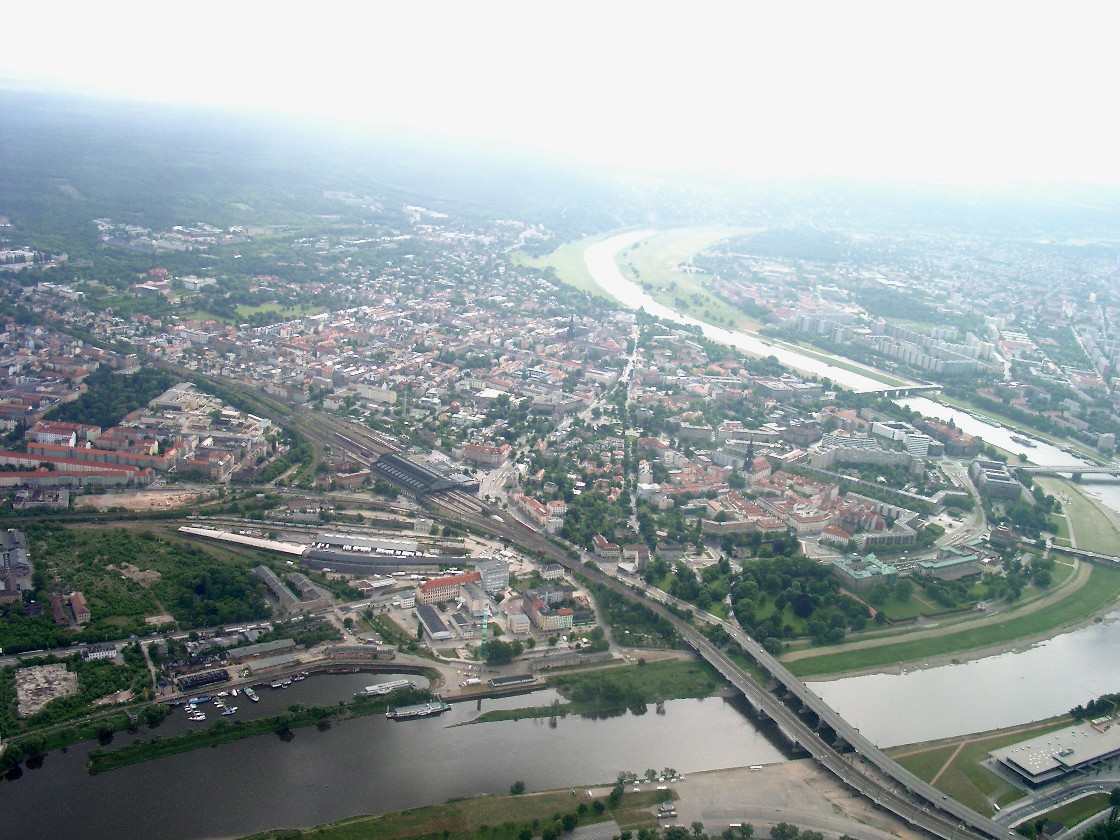
63 % of Dresden is green areas – The images includes parts of the inner city and the district of highest density in population as well as the Elbe meadows and the Dresden Heath forest

Due to the many rural districts it has incorporated, among other things, Dresden is one of the greenest cities in Europe, with 63% of the city being green areas and forests. The Dresden Heath (Dresdner Heide) in northern Dresden is a cohesive forest of 50 km^{2} in size. There are four nature reserves in Dresden. The additional Special Areas of Conservation cover an area of 18 km^{2}. The protected gardens, parkways, parks and old graveyards host 110 natural monuments in the city. The Dresden Elbe Valley is a world heritage site which is focused on the conservation of the cultural landscape in Dresden. One important part of that landscape is the Elbe meadows which cross the city, 20 kilometres long.

=== Climate ===
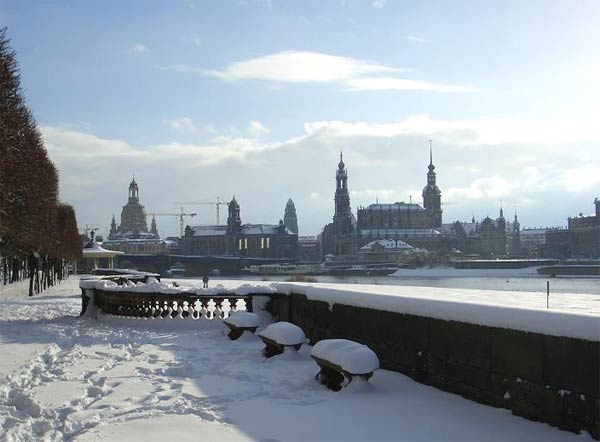
Winter in Dresden.

Most of the city is in the Elbe valley, where the microclimate differs from that on the slopes and in the highlands. Klotzsche, at 227 metres above sea level, is one of the higher districts of the city. Klotzsche hosts Dresden weather station. According to experience, the weather in Klotzsche is 1-3 °C colder than the inner city's climate. Especially in summer, there are generally high temperatures at night in the city: Temperatures of 25 °C at midnight are no exception. The average temperature in January is −0.7 °C and in July 18.1 °C. Summers are hotter in Dresden and winters are colder than the German average. Dresden lies in a climate zone of cold-moderate climate crossing over to a continental climate. The inner city's average monthly temperatures are almost the same as those in cities in southwest Germany; on average 10.2 °C per year. In hot summers, Dresden is between the hot Lusatia and the milder Ore Mountains. Both regions are characterised by strong winters: temperatures of −20 °C are not impossible in Dresden. The driest months are February and March, with precipitation of 40 mm. Spring months have often been arid in the last couple of years (with less than 10 mm of precipitation). The most precipitation falls in July and August, at 60 mm per month.

Climate data for Dresden
Month	Jan	Feb	Mar	Apr	May	Jun	Jul	Aug	Sep	Oct	Nov	Dec	Year
Mean daily maximum °C	4	6	11	17	21	23	25	25	21	15	9	4	15
Mean daily minimum °C	−2	−2	0	3	7	11	13	13	8	4	−1	−2	4
Average precipitation mm	37	33	36	45	58	67	63	69	49	40	43	45	585
Mean daily maximum °F	39	43	52	63	70	73	77	77	70	59	48	39	59
Mean daily minimum °F	28	28	32	37	45	52	55	55	46	39	30	28	40
Average precipitation inches	1.44	1.29	1.41	1.77	2.29	2.62	2.48	2.72	1.92	1.56	1.68	1.78	22.96
Source 1: weather.com
Source 2: Deutscher Wetterdienst

== Urban development ==
=== Flood protection ===
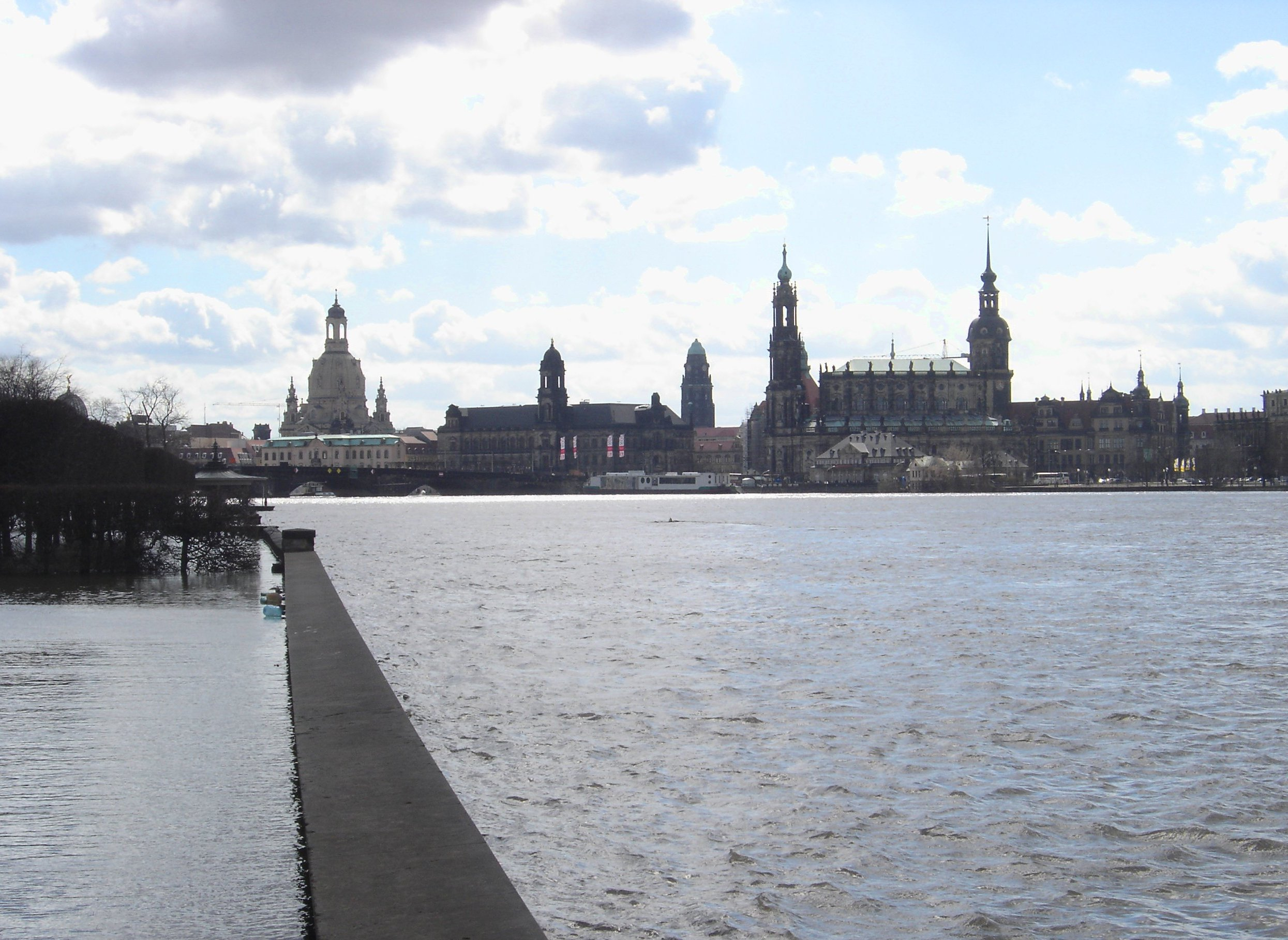
Dresden often floods

Due to its location on the banks of the Elbe and where some water sources from the Ore Mountains flow to, flood protection is an important aspect of the city's development. Large areas are kept free of buildings to provide a floodplain. Two additional trenches of about 50 metres in width have been built to keep the inner city free of water from the Elbe river by dissipating the water downstream through the inner city's gorge portion. Flood regulation systems like detention basins and water reservoirs are almost all outside the city area.

However many locations and areas have to be defended by walls and sheet pilings. A number of districts in Dresden become locked if the Elbe river is flooding some of its old bayous.

=== City structuring ===
Dresden is a spacious city, not only due to the most recent incorporations in the 1990s. The boroughs of the city differ in their structure and appearance. Many parts of city still contain an old village core, while some quarters are almost completely preserved as rural settings. Other characteristic kinds of urban areas are the historic outskirts of the city, the former suburbs with dotted housing. In Socialist times a lot of apartment blocks were built. Not unsurprisingly, the boroughs in Dresden are a mix of all these kinds of area.

The original parts of the city are almost all in the boroughs of Altstadt (Old town) and Neustadt (New town). Growing outside the city walls, the historic outskirts were built in the 18th century. They were planned and constructed on the instruction of the Saxon monarchs, which is why the outskirts are often named after the sovereigns. From the 19th century the city only grew by incorporating other municipalities.

Dresden was divided into the five Stadtbezirke (boroughs) Mitte (centre), Ost (east), West, Süd (south) and Nord (north) between 1958 and 1991. Nevertheless, these divisions had never been adopted by the local population.

Therefore, in 1991 Dresden has been divided into ten boroughs called Ortsamtsbereiche, which host subunits of the Dresden community's political and administrative institutions. These were renamed into Stadtbezirke in 2018. In addition nine former municipalities which have been incorporated between 1997 and 1999 form Ortschaften which are granted a higher degree of political self-rule. Both entities are further divided into several subdistricts, called Stadtteile and Ortsteile.

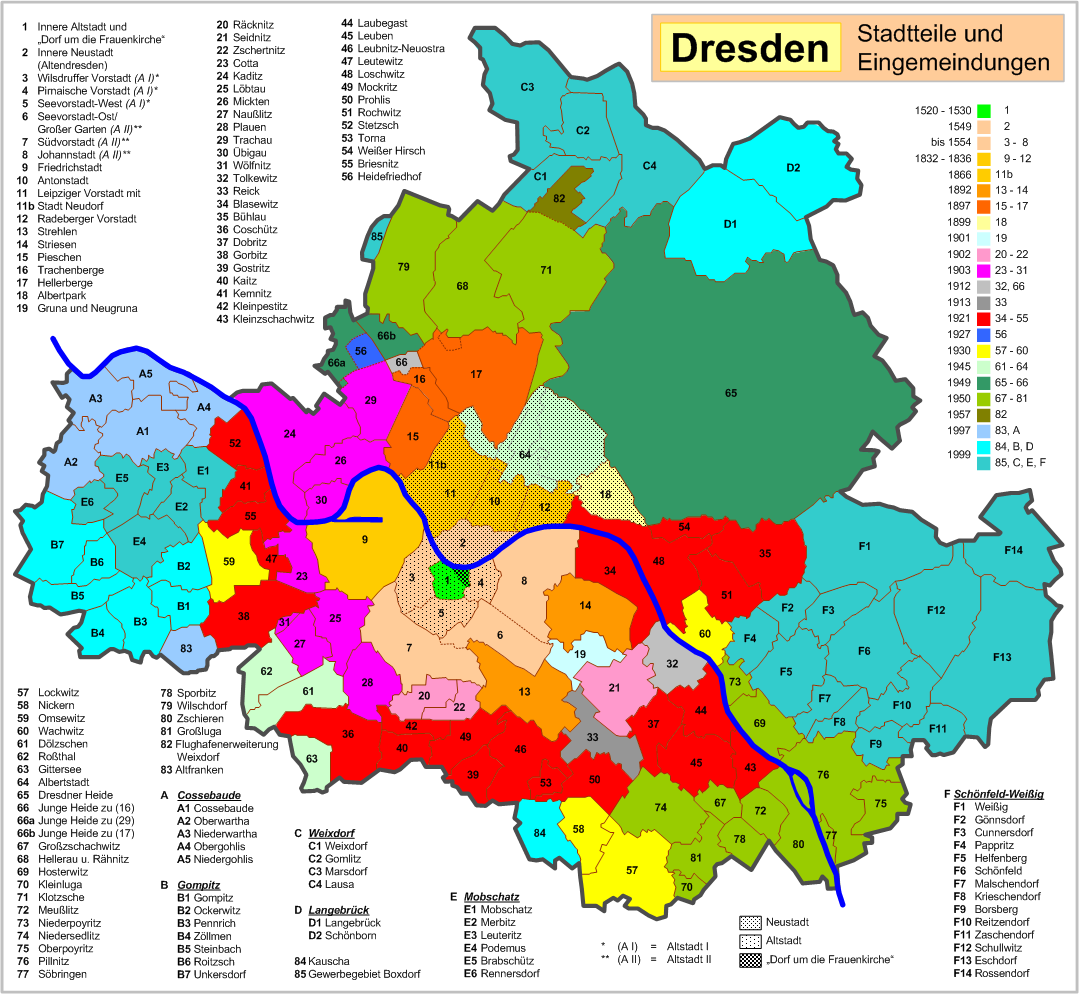
Stadtteile and Ortsteile subdivisions (cadastral map)

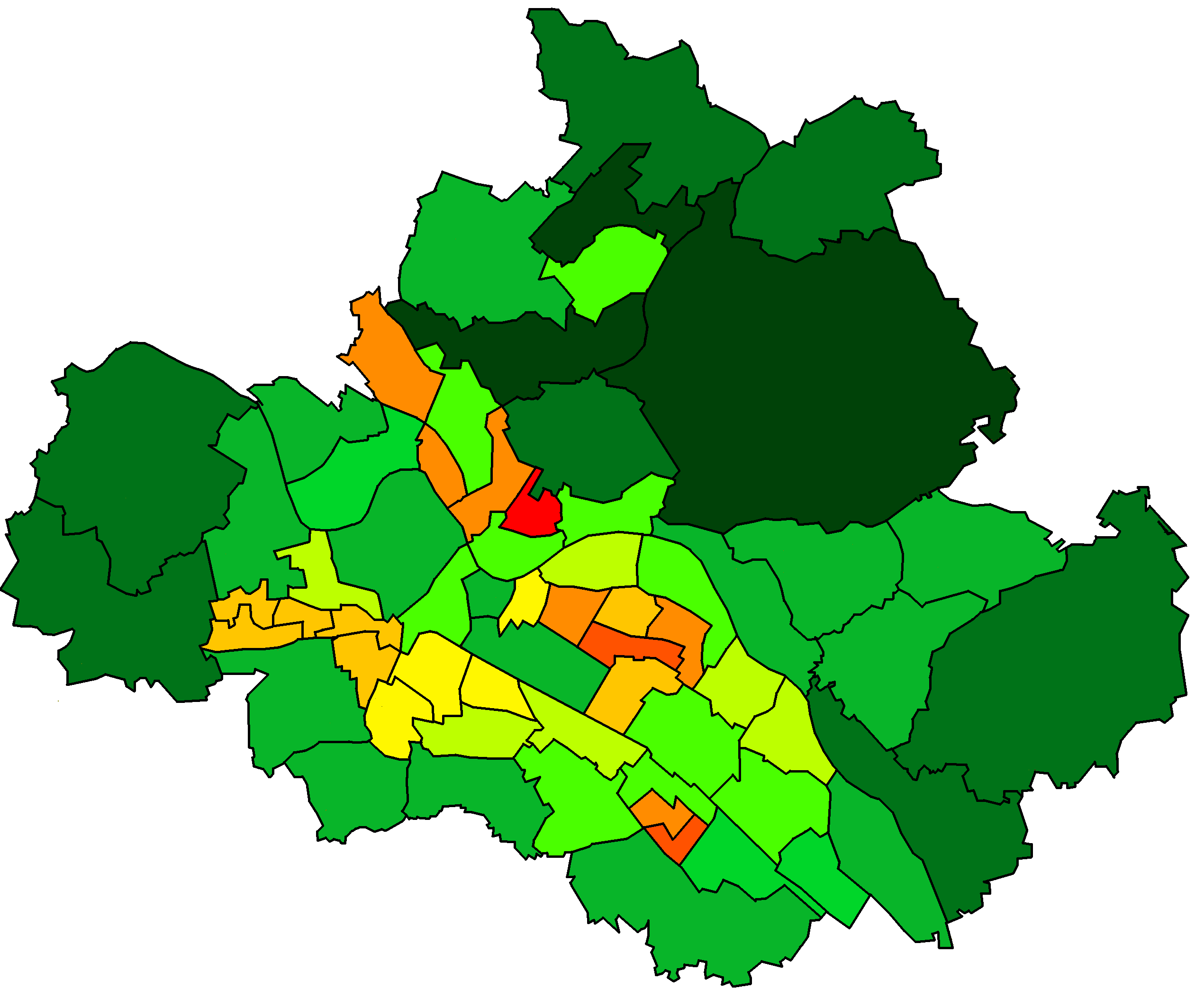
Populousness of the Dresden districts

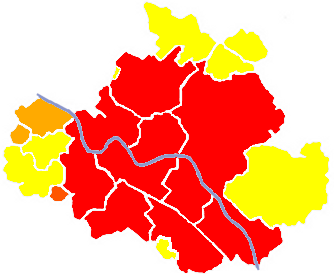
Incorporations: City area until 1996 1997 1999

==== Stadtbezirke ====
Stadtteile are indicated in small characters.

- Altstadt
  - Innere Altstadt, Pirnaische Vorstadt, Seevorstadt, Wilsdruffer Vorstadt, Friedrichstadt, Johannstadt
- Neustadt
  - Innere Neustadt, Äußere Neustadt, Leipziger Vorstadt, Radeberger Vorstadt, Albertstadt
- Pieschen
  - Pieschen, Mickten, Übigau, Kaditz, Trachau, Trachenberge
- Klotzsche
  - Klotzsche, Hellerau, Rähnitz, Wilschdorf, Hellerberge
- Loschwitz
  - Loschwitz, Wachwitz, Bühlau, Weißer Hirsch, Rochwitz, Hosterwitz, Pillnitz, Niederpoyritz, Oberpoyritz, Söbrigen
- Blasewitz
  - Blasewitz, Striesen, Tolkewitz, Seidnitz, Dobritz, Gruna
- Leuben
  - Leuben, Laubegast, Kleinzschachwitz, Meußlitz, Zschieren, Großzschachwitz, Sporbitz
- Prohlis
  - Prohlis, Niedersedlitz, Lockwitz, Kauscha, Nickern, Luga, Leubnitz-Neuostra, Torna, Strehlen, Reick
- Plauen
  - Südvorstadt, Räcknitz, Zschertnitz, Kleinpestitz, Mockritz, Kaitz, Gostritz, Coschütz, Gittersee, Plauen
- Cotta
  - Cotta, Löbtau, Naußlitz, Wölfnitz, Roßthal, Dölzschen, Gorbitz, Briesnitz, Kemnitz, Stetzsch, Leutewitz, Omsewitz

==== Ortschaften ====
Ortsteile are indicated in small characters.

- Altfranken (incorporated 1997)
- Cossebaude (1997)
  - Cossebaude, Neu-Leuteritz, Niederwartha, Gohlis
- Gompitz (1999)
  - Gompitz, Ockerwitz, Pennrich, Roitzsch, Steinbach, Unkersdorf, Zöllmen
- Langebrück (1999)
- Mobschatz (1999)
  - Mobschatz, Alt-Leuteritz, Brabschütz, Merbitz, Podemus, Rennersdorf
- Oberwartha (1997)
- Schönborn (1999)
- Schönfeld-Weißig (1999)
  - Borsberg, Cunnersdorf, Eichbusch, Eschdorf, Gönnsdorf, Helfenberg, Krieschendorf, Malschendorf, Pappritz, Reitzendorf, Rockau, Rossendorf, Schönfeld, Schullwitz, Weißig, Zaschendorf
- Weixdorf (1999)
  - Weixdorf, Lausa, Friedersdorf, Gomlitz, Marsdorf

The district with the largest population is Blasewitz; the largest by area is Loschwitz. The largest Ortschaft is Schönfeld-Weißig covering an area called Schönfelder Hochland (Schönfeld Highlands). The inner city consists of the Altstadt and Neustadt districts.
