= Klotzsche =

- Borough of Dresden
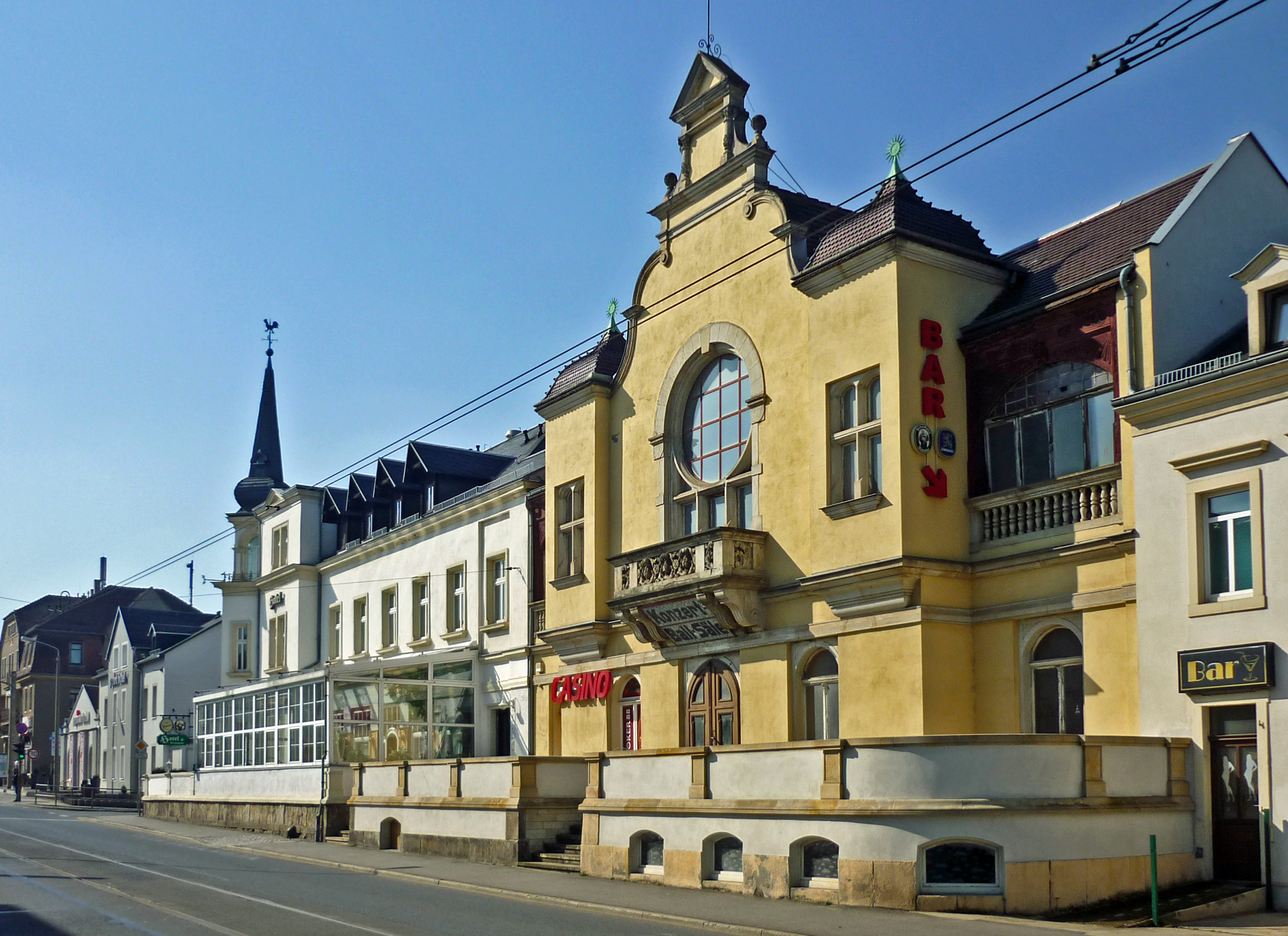
- Casino

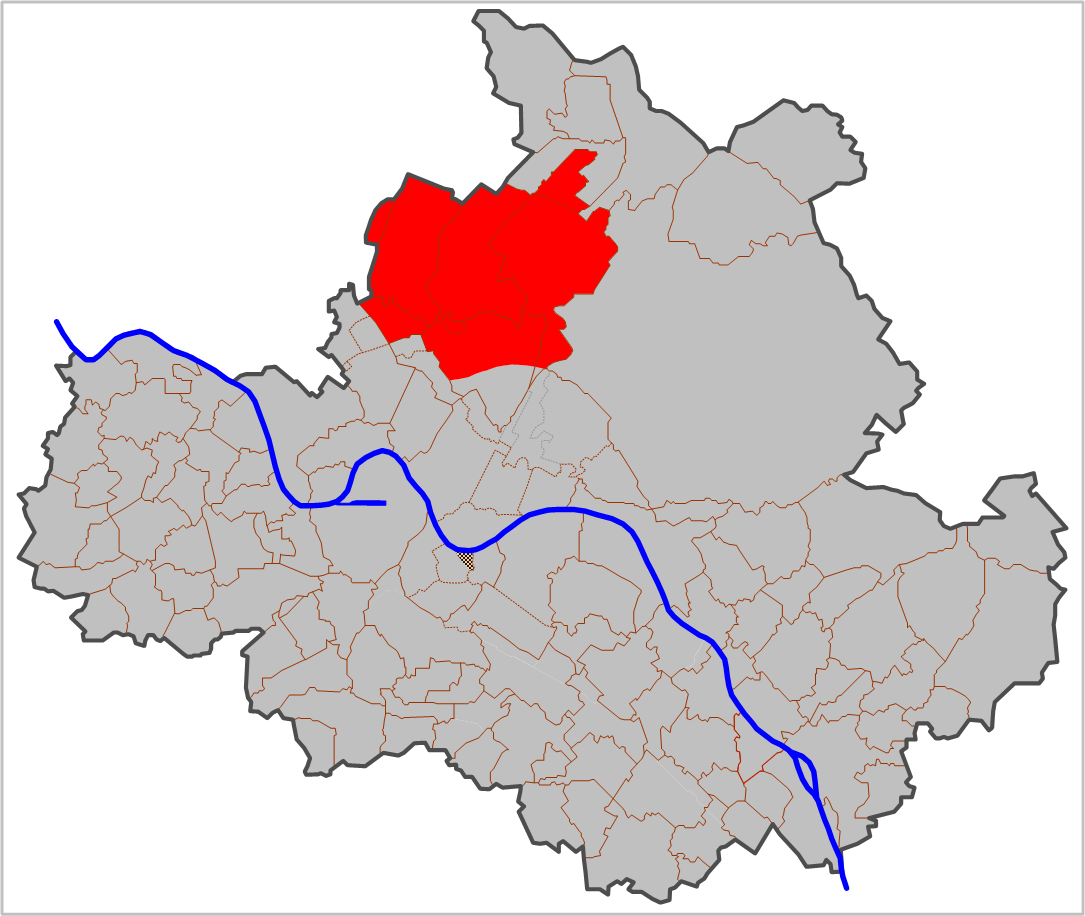
- Location of Loschwitz in Dresden
- Interactive map of Klotzsche
- Location within Germany Location within Saxony
- Coordinates: 51°6′59″N 13°46′42″E
- Country: Germany
- State: Saxony
- District: Urban district
- City: Dresden

Area
  - Total: 27.07 km^{2} (10.45 sq mi)

Population (2020-12-31)
  - Total: 21,064
  - Density: 778.1/km^{2} (2,015/sq mi)
- Time zone: UTC+01:00 (CET)
  - Summer (DST): UTC+02:00 (CEST)
- Dialling codes: 0351
- Vehicle registration: DD

Klotzsche (German pronunciation: [ˈklɔtʃə]) is a borough (Stadtbezirk) of Dresden, Germany. It consists of four quarters (Stadtteile):

- Klotzsche proper
- Hellerau
- Rähnitz
- Wilschdorf

The borough is located north of the Elbe Valley and the Dresden city centre, on the western rim of the Lusatian Plateau. It borders the extended Dresden Heath woodlands on the Prießnitz river in the south and east, and the area of Moritzburg in the northwest.

Klotzsche hosts the major Dresden weather station and the international airport of the city. While Klotzsche has a historic villa quarter, that quarter does not have many residents. The northern part comprises the major industrial locations of Silicon Saxony, such as GlobalFoundries, Fab 1, and Infineon Technologies. Klotsche can easily be reached from the city center with the tram number 7, commuter trains, and urban and suburban bus lines.
