= Mickten =

- Quarter of Dresden
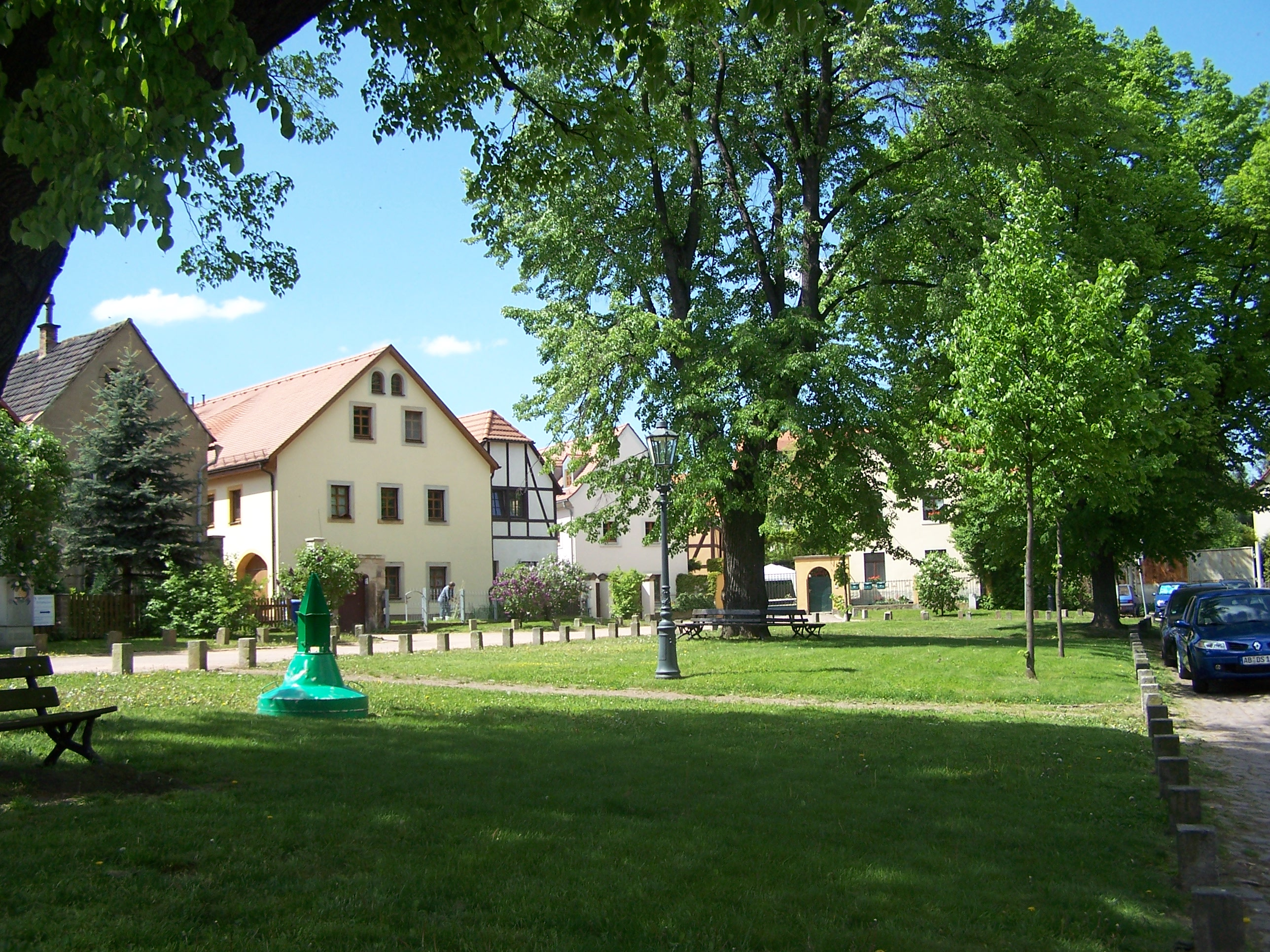

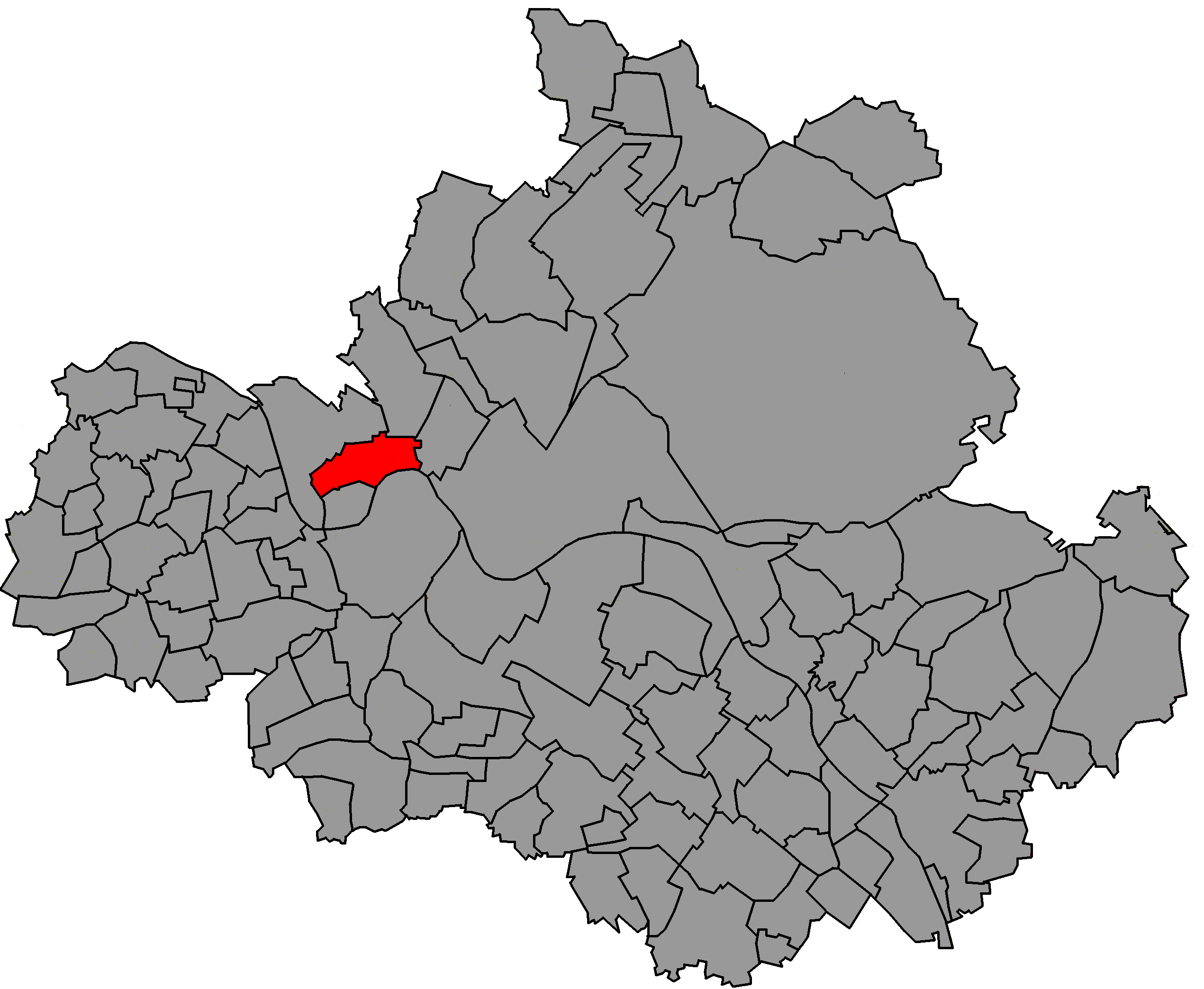
- Location of the quarter of Mickten in Dresden
- Interactive map of Mickten
- Location within Germany Location within Saxony
- Coordinates: 51°4′28″N 13°42′3″E
- Country: Germany
- State: Saxony
- District: Urban district
- City: Dresden
- Borough: Pieschen

Population (2020-12-31)
  - Total: 13,389
- Time zone: UTC+01:00 (CET)
  - Summer (DST): UTC+02:00 (CEST)
- Vehicle registration: DD

Mickten (German pronunciation: [ˈmɪktn̩]) is a quarter (Stadtteil) of the city of Dresden, eastern Germany. It is part of the northwestern borough (Stadtbezirk) of Pieschen.

The historic village at the road to Leipzig north of the Elbe river was incorporated into Dresden in 1903. From 1990 a new commercial area between Mickten and the neighbouring Kaditz quarter was developed including the Elbe Park mall with numerous shops and a cinema. The infrastructure of Mickten was severely damaged by the 2002 Elbe floods.

From 1946 Mickten had a football club called SG Mickten that merged with the Dresdner SC in 1954.
