= Prießnitz (Elbe) =

River in Germany

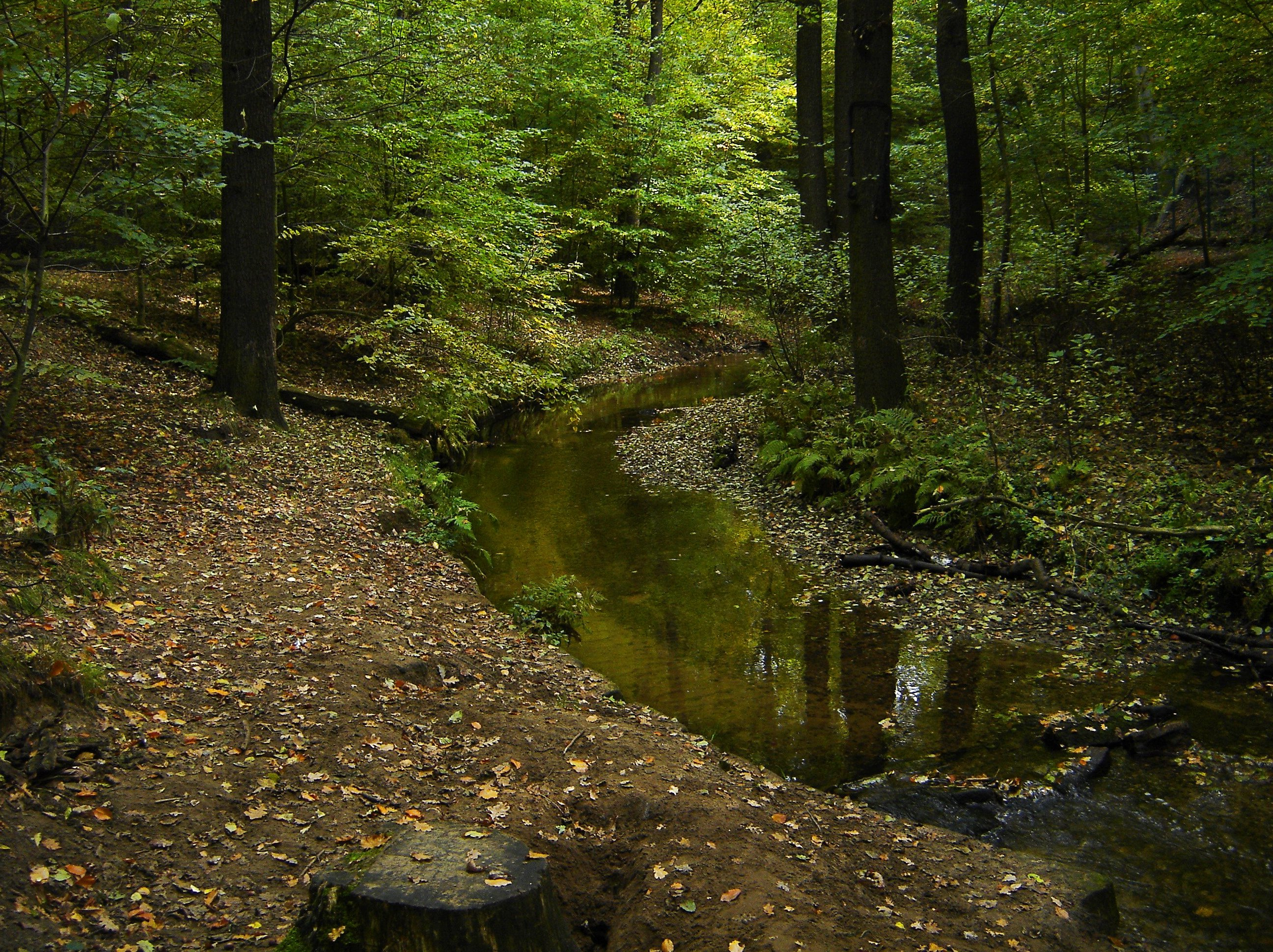

Location
- Country: Germany
- States: Saxony

Physical characteristics
- Mouth
  - location: Elbe
  - coordinates: 51.0618°N 13.7625°E

Basin features
- Progression: Elbe→ North Sea

The Prießnitz (German pronunciation: [ˈpʁiːsnɪts]) is a river of Saxony, Germany. It is a right tributary of the Elbe, which it joins in Dresden. For much of its length it flows through the Dresden Heath.

== See also ==
- List of rivers of Saxony
