= Trachenberge =

- Quarter
- Wohnhaus Trachenberge Weinbergstraße 48
- Interactive map of Trachenberge
- Country: Germany
- State: Saxony
- City: Dresden

Trachenberge is a quarter in the city of Dresden located in the state of Saxony in Germany. It between in the northern part of the city between Pieschen and Kaditz. The area is known for its hillside and views of the Elbe river valley.
