= Dresden Heath =

Forest in Dresden, Germany

Coordinates: 51.0956°N 13.8381°E

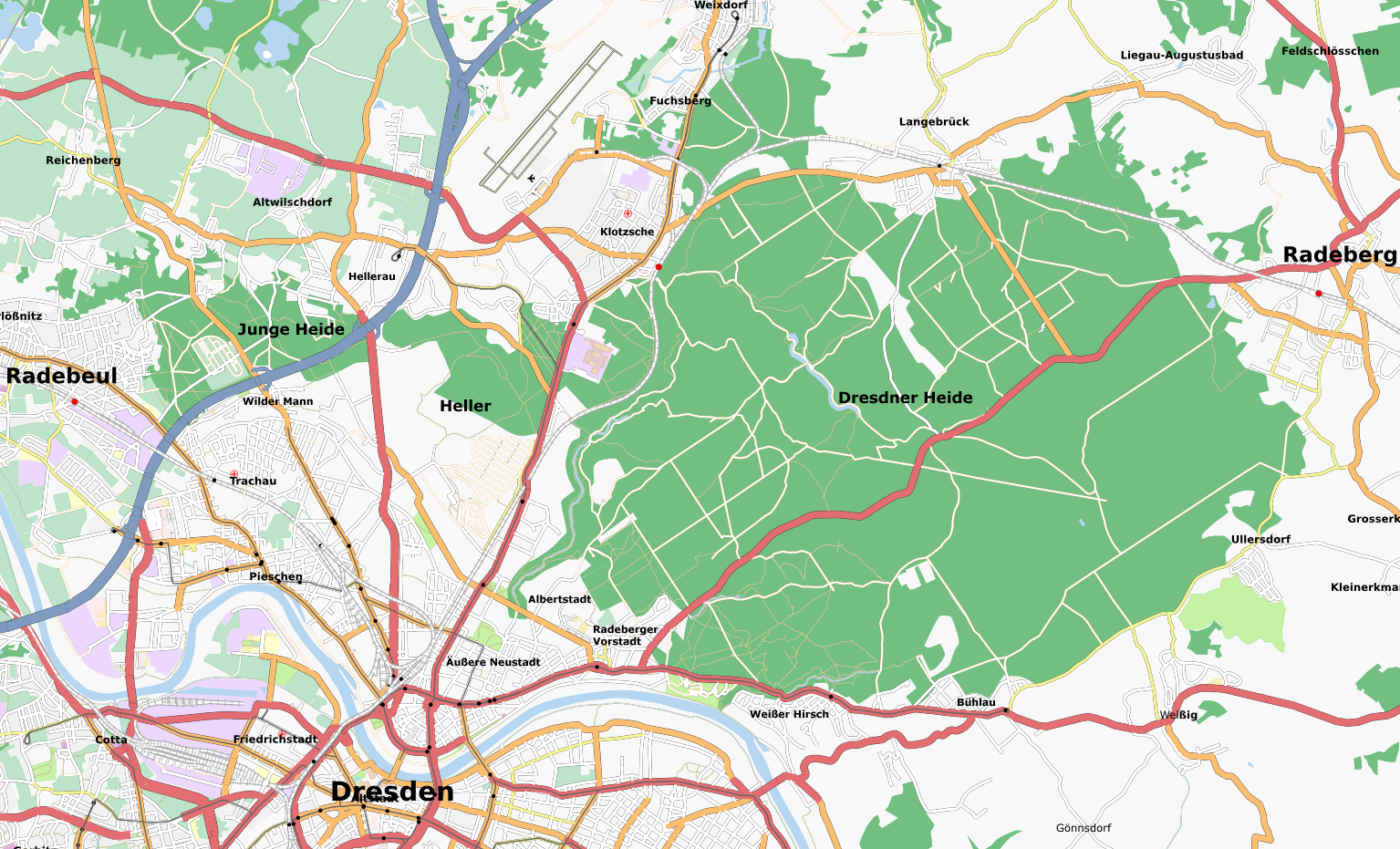
Map of the Dresden Heath

The Dresden Heath (German: Dresdner Heide, pronounced [ˈdʁeːsdnɐ ˈhaɪdə]) is a large forest in the city of Dresden, Germany. The heath is the most important recreation area in the city and is also actively forested. Approximately 6,133 hectares of the Dresden Heath are designated as a nature preserve, making it one of the largest municipal forests in Germany by area. Though mainly agricultural areas border the forest in the east, in all other directions the Dresden Heath is bordered by districts of the city and reaches nearly to the city centre in the southwest.

The forest exhibits a transition, both in its geology and in its plant and animal life, between the North German Plain and the Central Uplands. Except for small areas, the Dresden Heath is considered part of the western Lusatian Highlands and, consequently, is one of the westernmost parts of the Sudetes. Though the rocky subsoil of the forest was raised during the tectonic formation of the Dresden Basin, the mixed woodland of the heath is largely characterized by dune-like sand deposits of the Wolstonian Stage and Elster glaciation. The proximity of the Dresden Heath to the centre of Dresden led to its use as a princely hunting ground, as well as its cultivation and cultural development.

== Location ==
Located in the northeast of the Saxon capital, the main part of the heath stretches from the city centre to the border of Dresden. The forest is mainly outside the urban area of Dresden and is largely in the administrative region of Loschwitz. In contrast to the other parts of this administrative area, the 4,836 hectare region is not considered an urban district, but forms a fully-fledged district of the same status. Smaller regions on the edge of the heath belong to the administrative districts of Neustadt and Klotzsche, as well as to the town of Radeburg. In the south, the main part of the heath stretches between Loschwitz and the Waldschlösschen district, to the slopes of the Elbe and to Radeberger Vorstadt. The southernmost offshoots even border on the heavily populated Äussere Neustadt. In the west, the forest meets Albertstadt and Klotzsche. In the north, it is bordered by the Weixdorf districts of Lausa and Friedersdorf as well as by Langebrück and Liegau-Augustusbad. In the east the forest is bordered by the town of Radeberg and its districts of Großerkmannsdorf and Ullersdorf.

The Junge Heide ("Young Heath"), the smaller part, is to the west of the main part of the heath in the northwest of Dresden. It is bordered in the north by the districts of Wilschdorf and Hellerau, in the east by the Heller and in the south by Trachenberge and Trachau. In the west the Junge Heide meets the Radebeuler districts of Oberlößnitz and Alt-Radebeul, in the northwest, Boxdorf. The part of the Junge Heide in the districts of Hellerberge and Wilschdorf belongs to the administrative district of Klotzsche. The western part of the Junge Heide, on the other hand, is assigned to Trachau. Together with a small area on the edge of the heath in the south that belongs to Trachenberge, it is in the administrative district of Pieschen. Further areas in the west of the Junge Heide are administered from Moritzburg or Radebeul.

Surrounding landscapes include Lößnitz in the West, the Friedewald and the Moritzburg pond region in the northwest. In the north, the Königsbrück-Ruhland Heaths and the Seifersdorf valley border the forest in the northeast. The landscape to the southeast is the Schönfeld Upland. On the southern border of the Heide, the forest segues into the park and garden landscape of the Dresden Elbe valley.

== History of the Forest ==
Originally, the Dresden Heath was part of the expansive, continuous border forest between the Sorbian regions of Nisan and Milska. It was out of this forest that the Mark of Meißen and Upper Lusatia developed. Originally, the Dresden Heath began in the city centre of Dresden and stretched seamlessly to the Lößnitz as well as to Kaditz, in the form of the Kaditz Forest. Archaeological discoveries, such as the Bronze Age burial grounds and late Stone Age Corded Ware pottery give evidence of early settlements in this area. The settlement of the region reduced the area of the forest with time. As part of the German eastward settlement in the twelfth and thirteenth centuries, efforts to clear the forest reduced it to something close to its current size, though the Dresden Heath still stretched into the centre of Dresden, and the Junge Heide was not yet a separate forest.

After 1372, the Dresden Heath was sovereign property assigned to the office of Radeberg, servicing the court of Saxony as a vast hunting territory from the Middle Ages to the First World War. The court in Dresden could 'hunt' its way from Dresden to the hunting retreat, Moritzburg Castle. Evidence of the heath's hunting history are the four so-called Saugärten ('Swine gardens,' used in the hunt to hold captured wild boar, until it could be released to be hunted). Farmers have also used parts of the heath, such as the two meadows, for agriculture. In the light, sandy soil, agriculture did not last long and fields were often actively reforested or reclaimed by the forest itself. From 1484, the heath was administered by the Dresden Forest Office. The forest was heavily damaged in the Thirty Years' War as enemy troops burned parts of the forest and plundered surrounding villages. The Seven Years' War also brought great losses of wood to the Prussian occupiers. In 1831 the heath became a possession of the Saxon State but remained hunting grounds of the sovereign.

In the beginning of the nineteenth century the heath had an area of over 70 square kilometres, roughly fifty percent more than now. It still reached in the city centre across the Bischofsweg. The Förstereistraße ('Forestry Street') in Neustadt is named after a forester's lodge that existed there near the forest. Then the heath was reduced by 10 square kilometres for military reasons. Large areas were deforested after 1827 to create a training ground for the Saxon army, resulting in the existence of the Heller. After 1873 barracks were constructed in the new military district in Albertstadt, significantly reducing the southwestern area of the heath. Adjacent areas of the forest were also inaccessible because they were behind firing ranges. In the late nineteenth century, the former suburbs of Dresden began to grow. The Radeberger Vorstadt (city suburb in the direction of Radeberg) stretched further and further into the forest. Within a few years, people pushed the heath back out of the city centre by two kilometres. Klotzsche also grew into a city, in part at the expense of the forest. In Radebeul-Ost, Bad Weißer Hirsch, Klotzsche-Königswald and the Radeberger Vorstadt more of the heath was converted into 'forest parks.' At the beginning of the twentieth century, the responsible authorities required compensatory plantings to counter smaller clearings of the heath. This resulted in the planting of a small forest near Biegau in 1910.

The Dresden Heath and Junge Heide became separated due to the development of transport corridors such as Radeburger and Königsbrücker Streets as well as the Saxon-Silesian railway and, finally, the present A4 motorway. In the Third Reich, planned highway construction affected the northeast part of the forest. The plan was for a continuation of the present Autobahn 13, resulting in a Berlin-Dresden-Prague connection. Some of the deforestation between Radeberg and Heidemühle was completed, but construction did not begin in the Second World War. The plans were later discarded and, in 2000, the same connection was built but with a completely different route and without affecting the heath in any way. In the 1930s there were plans for a continuation of the now-decommissioned rail line between Dürröhrsdorf and Weißig, along the Prießnitz valley across the heath. This, too, remained in the planning stage and, since then, the forest has not been reduced by large construction projects.

Since its incorporation into the city on the fourth of March, 1949, the Dresden Heath belongs to Dresden. Declared a special forest and recreation area in 1967, it has been a protected landscape since 1969. Due to forestry however, almost no area of the heath can be considered old growth forest. There are still inaccessible parts of the heath, a result of the former military use or of the construction of transportation buildings.

== See also ==
- Großer Garten

== Literature and sources ==
- Paul Hermann Barthel: Unsere Heide. Kulturgeschichtliche Streifzüge durch Dresdens größtes Waldgebiet. Beßner Verlag, Dresden 1935.
- Sigrid Both u.a. (Hrsg): Dresdner Heide. Berg- und Naturverlag Rölke, Dresden 2006, ISBN 3-934514-18-9.
- Bertram Greve: Radeberger Land. In: Die Radeberger Heimat. Interessengemeinschaft Die Radeberger Heimat, Radeberg 1994, Ed. 1 [published with Ed. 2 (1996)]
- Rolf Hertel, Hans-Jürgen Hardtke: Pflanzen und Tiere der Dresdner Heide. Staatliches Museum für Tierkunde, Dresden, 1987, ISBN 3-910007-05-8.
- Heinrich Meschwitz: Geschichte der Dresdner Heide und ihrer Bewohnerschaft. Verlag Heinrich, Dresden, 1911.
- Otto Koepert, Oskar Pusch (ed.): Die Dresdner Heide und ihre Umgebung. Verlag Heinrich, Dresden, 1932.
- Herbert Wotte: Dresdner Heide. Bibliographisches Institut, Leipzig, 1962 (Unser kleines Wanderheft; Booklet 9)
- Topographic map 1:50000, Sheet L 4948, Landesvermessungsamt Sachsen, 1995
- Messtischblatt 1:25000, Sheet 4948, Landesaufnahme Sachsen 1910, 1939, unveränderter Nachdruck Landesvermessungsamt Sachsen, 1993
- Dresdner Heide, Pillnitz, Radeberger Land. Edition no. 1 Akademie-Verlag Berlin, Berlin 1976 (Werte unserer Heimat. Vol. 27). p. 72ff.
