= Albertstadt =

Neighborhood of Dresden, Germany

Coordinates: 51°04′48″N 13°45′27″E

The Albertstadt (German pronunciation: [ˈalbɛʁtˌʃtat]) is a neighborhood of Dresden, Germany. It was named after Albert of Saxony, who initiated the construction of this suburb. At that time it was the largest garrison in Germany.

Today, the Military History Museum of the German Federal Armed Forces is located in one of the former military arsenals. Although the major military center of the region, the district was not specially attacked in the 1945 allied bombings and it suffered only marginal destruction.

== Geography ==
=== Location ===
Albertstadt is located in Northern Dresden, is around three kilometres from the city center, Innere Altstadt. It is surrounded by Radeberger Vorstadt, Antonstadt and Leipziger Vorstadt in the south, and Dresdner Heide, as well as Heller in the north.

Albertstadt has 3,269 inhabitants (2020). With 7.55 km^{2}, it is one of the largest neighborhoods in Dresden, and it has a low population density of 351 people per square kilometre.

== Buildings and facilities of the garrison ==
- Church of Saint Martin (former Garrison Church)
