= Bundeswehr Military History Museum =

Military museum in Germany

- Militärhistorisches Museum der Bundeswehr

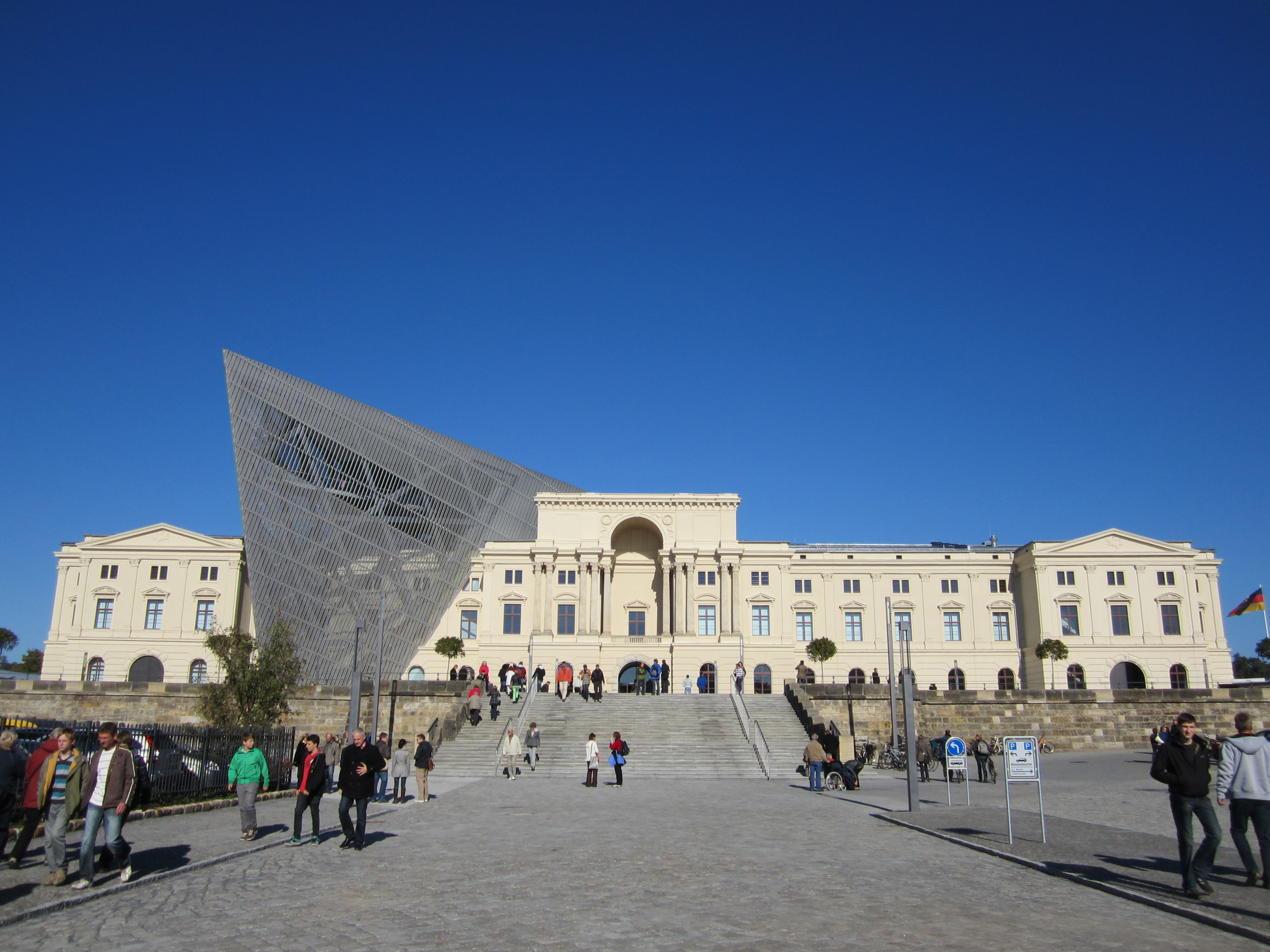
- The Militärhistorisches Museum der Bundeswehr shortly after it re-opened in October 2011
- Location: Dresden, Germany
- Coordinates: 51°04′43″N 13°45′36″E
- Type: Military history
- Director: Rudolf J. Schlaffer
- Curator: Kristiane Janeke
- Public transit access: Stauffenbergallee tram stop
- Website: https://mhmbw.de/
- Opening times: Thursday–Tuesday; 10 a.m. – 6 p.m. (Mon 9 p.m.)

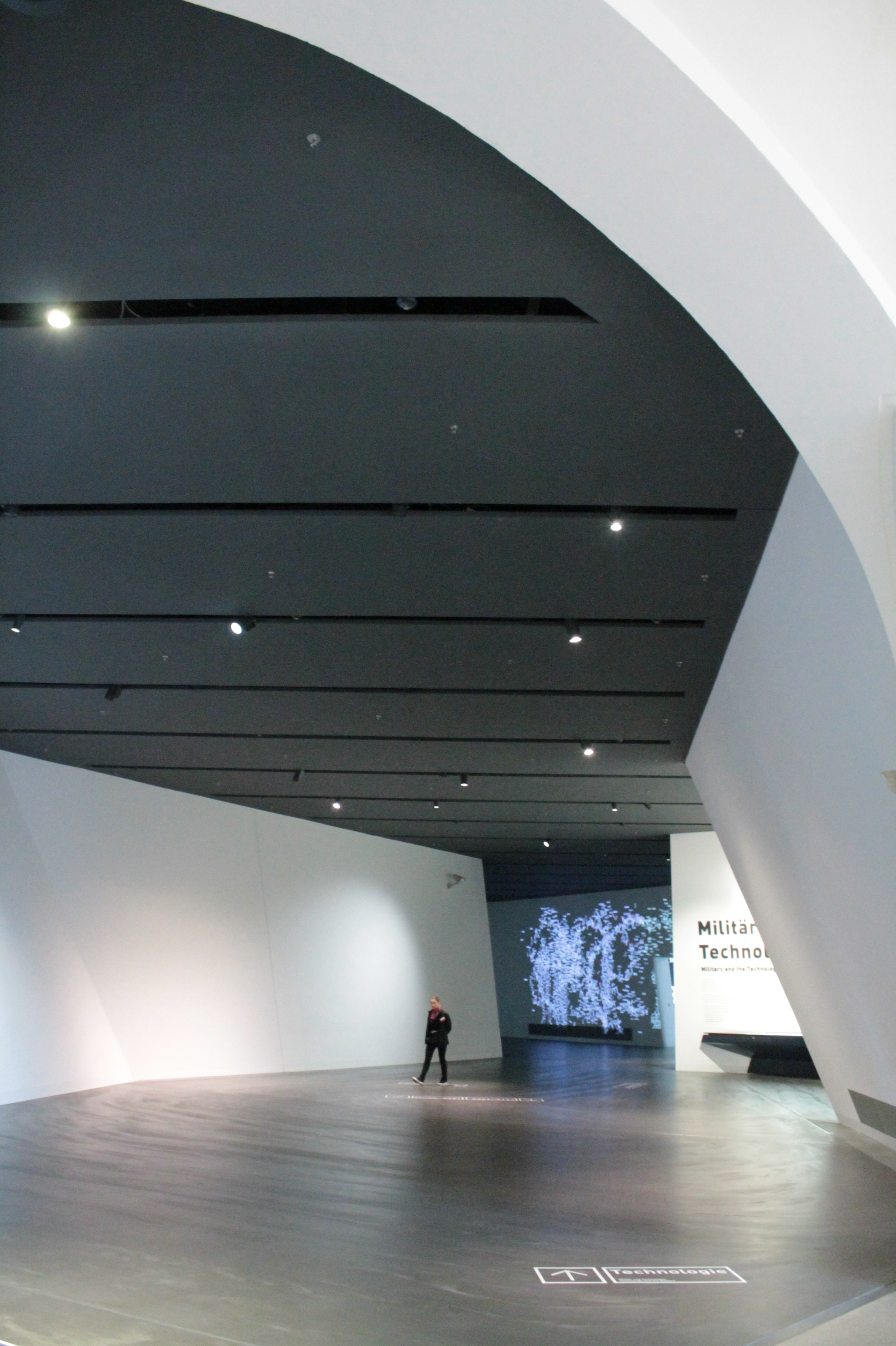
Interior, and view of art work 'Love and Hate' by Charles Sandison. Bundeswehr Military History Museum, Dresden

The Bundeswehr Military History Museum (German: Militärhistorisches Museum der Bundeswehr (MHMBw)) is the military museum of the German Armed Forces, the Bundeswehr, and one of the major military history museums in Germany. It is located in a former military arsenal in the Albertstadt which is part of Dresden. After a long history of switching titles and approaches to military history, the museum was re-opened in 2011 with a new internal and external concept. The museum focuses on the human aspects of war, while also showcasing the evolution of German military technology.

Lieutenant Colonel Dr Rudolf J. Schlaffer heads the museum as director since October 2021. From 2004 onwards and in addition to the directors, historians are appointed as academic leadership and to design the permanent exhibition. Since September 2020, historian Dr Kristiane Janeke has held this position and is the head of the museum's exhibitions, collection and research department.

== Architecture ==
The original building, the armory, was built between 1873 and 1876 and became a museum in 1897. Originally the Saxon armory and museum, the building has served as a Nazi museum, a Soviet museum and an East German museum which reflected the region's shifting social and political positions over the last 135 years. In 1989, the museum was closed because the newly unified German state was unsure how the museum would fit into the history being created. By 2001, feelings regarding the museum had shifted and an architectural competition was held for an extension which would cause visitors to reconsider the way they think about war.

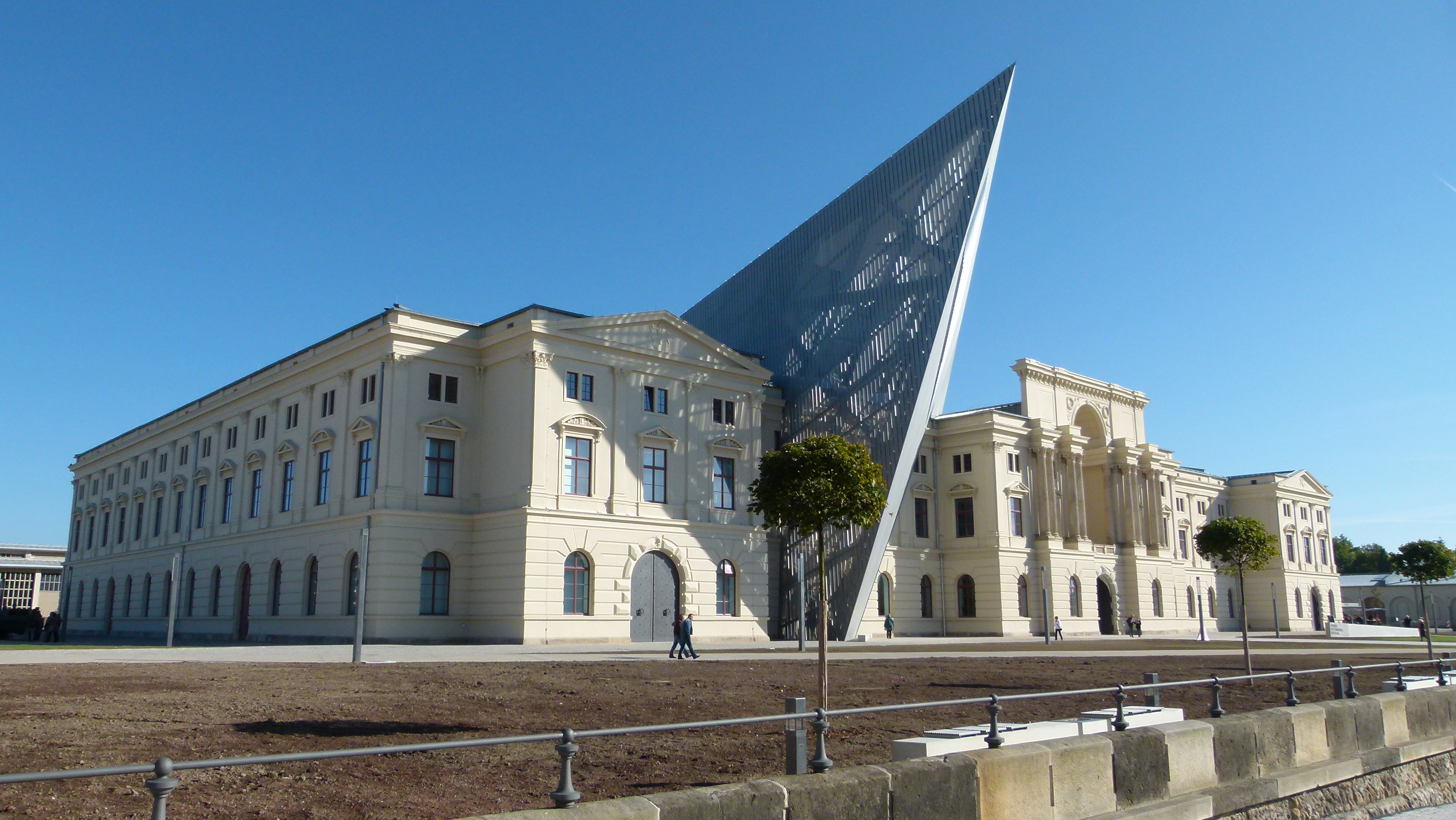
Museum as it appeared when it re-opened in 2011

Before opening in October 2011 as the Bundeswehr Military History Museum, the building underwent six years of extensive construction. Jewish architect Daniel Libeskind added a transparent arrowhead to the façade of the building, creating, according to the Dresden Tourism board, "an outwardly visible expression of innovation". This new element is also reflected in the logo of the museum. Libeskind's studio states that "the openness and transparency of the new façade, representing the openness of democratic society, contrasts with the rigidity of the existing building, which represents the severity of the authoritarian past". The silver arrowhead protrudes from the center of the traditional Neo-Classical building and provides a five-story, 29 meter high viewing platform which overlooks the city. The platform provides views of modern Dresden while pointing towards the area where the fire bombings of Dresden began. The redesigned Dresden Museum of Military history has become the main museum of the German Armed Forces. The building itself is 14,000 square meters and has an inside and outside exhibition area of about 20,000 square meters, making it Germany's largest museum. In every aspect, the museum is designed to alter the public's perception of war.

== Museum history ==
The original armory building was completed in 1876 as an armory for Kaiser Wilhelm I. The Arsenal main building in the center of Dresden's Albert City served as an armory for roughly twenty years, until it was transformed into a museum in 1897. Since then, the main building of the arsenal has housed the Royal Arsenal Collection, the Royal Saxon Army Museum, and in 1923 became the Saxon Army Museum. After 1938, the museum became the Army Museum of the Wehrmacht, and in 1972 the Army Museum of the GDR. Seven months before German reunification, the museum was renamed the Military History Museum in Dresden.

On February 13 and 14, 1945, British bomber planes commenced an air attack against Dresden, creating a vast firestorm below. During the first phase, 244 Lancaster bombers dropped high explosive and incendiary bombs aimed at the center of the city. American B-17 bombers followed the next morning, to destroy the city's railroad marshaling yards. While much of the city was in ruins, the museum and most of the other military buildings in the Albertstadt survived the bombing of Dresden because of its location on the city's outskirts. The building withstood World War II attacks on Germany and continued to be used as a military museum until it was closed in 1989. It re-opened again in 2011 and provided a new way of presenting military history. The exhibition concept and design was developed by HG Merz.

== Inside the museum ==
The museum has made an effort to distance itself from the usual presentations of military history. Instead of glorifying war and armies, the museum tries to present the causes and consequences of war and violence. The focus is placed on the human component of war, on the hopes, fears, passion, courage, memories and aspirations of those involved. The museum seeks to inform visitors about military history while encouraging them to ask questions and seek new answers. Visitors can go through the museum through two approaches: thematic sections, and a chronological tour. Additionally, the museum showcases the history of Military Technology, Handguns, Uniforms and Insignia, Order, Art, an Image Archive, Records, and a Library.

The museum houses a vast collection of military history, from technology and handguns to artistic renderings of war. Traditionally, military museums focus primarily on weapons technology and the glamorous representation of national armed forces; they impress visitors by shows of military power and display wars in isolation from other historic events. The museum has made an effort to be a different kind of military museum. It displays war and the military as being interwoven in the general history of a nation, and it exhibits the ramifications of war within the context of political, cultural and social history. The focus, instead of being on the greater good or the military whole, is always on the individual who exercises violence or suffers from it. Eleven themed tours are offered and three chronologies: 1300–1914, 1914–1945 and 1945–today.

Among historically significant items displayed is the ship's bell from SMS Schleswig-Holstein, a pre-dreadnought battleship that fired what are generally regarded as the first shots of World War II (in Europe) when on Sept. 1, 1939, it shelled Polish positions at Westerplatte in the then- Free City of Danzig.

=== Military Technology ===
In the Military Technology section of the museum, objects are displayed which have been assigned to three main groups. These are: Large Equipment and ammunition, Device and Equipment and Scale-based Replicas and Models. Over 800 land, air and sea vehicles, along with over 1,000 guns, hand guns, rockets and flamethrowers have been collected for the museum. Additionally, this section includes a large collection of military space technology. While the collection in this section focuses on devices used by the military, with over 45,000 objects belonging to the military, there are also witness accounts to accompany the display. Witnesses describe the life and suffering of civilians during wartime.

=== Firearms ===
The valuable and extensive collection of firearms is considered one of the most important collections in Germany's museum landscape. This is especially due to the large proportion of Saxon weapons on display. Included in the museum are 4,250 firearms spanning from rifles, carbines and machine guns, as well as 3,250 handguns such as pistols and revolvers that make up the collection of Feuerwaffen. Additionally, several experimental weapons are included in the collection. There are also cutting and stabbing weapons in this section. The collection includes roughly 1,700 sabers, swords and broadswords; almost 1,100 bayonets, 800 daggers, 400 Faschinenmesser and 400 polearms.

=== Uniforms ===
Military uniforms are influenced by the politics of the time, along with culture, ideology, and the economy. Examining the story of uniforms helps one understand the thinking and mindset of a certain era. Within the Bundeswehr Military History Museum, the display of uniforms is considered one of the most meaningful exhibitions. This section includes mostly German uniforms, especially those from the late 19th century to present due to the state of preservation. Also included are some uniforms, insignia and regalia of foreign forces, particularly of other European nations. These are also used to represent allies to the German state in exhibitions. The collection includes almost 70,000 field uniforms. In addition to outerwear, underwear, shoes, headgear, and military equipment being on display, there are also badges, musical instruments and banners. One remarkable piece within the collection is the Spencer jacket from 1805 which belonged to Queen Louise, the "Sissi Prussia", mother of the first German Emperor Wilhelm I.

=== Art ===
Along with relics of military history, the museum contains a fairly extensive art collection, the foundation of which was laid in 1857 by Officer Ludwig Georg von Wurmb who brought together images depicting the history of the Royal Saxon Army. Nearly 1,100 paintings, 500 sculptures, 12,000 drawings and prints have been added to the early collection by an eclectic group of artists including Jacques Callog, William Campenhausen, Max Liebermann, Lea Grundig and Bernhard Heisig. All the pieces include the theme of war and military.

=== Image archive ===
The image archive houses a collection of preserved paper photographs, pictures, photo postcards, photo albums, picture negatives, and slides of German and international military history. Nearly one million artifacts are housed in this section which focuses on everyday life of the German armed forces. The images archive the formation, equipment and training of armed forces past and present. While professional images are showcased, so are amateur photographers from both world wars. Particularly noteworthy in this section are photographs of Dresden by Willy Rossner and Soviet war photographer G. Samsonov.

=== Records ===
The records collection showcases the written history of the military from the 17th century to the present. Almost 150,000 objects which reference the military are held in the collection. These include the personal documents of soldiers such as military passports, diaries, or letters and provide a comprehensive review of military life. Emphasis is placed on the collection of posters, cards, leaflets, newspapers and magazines. There is also an audio component of this section which plays extensive interviews with eyewitnesses to military life. These give personal perspective into the political communication strategies and social values of the times in which they occurred.

=== Library/Technical Information Center ===
The museum library not only serves as a way to showcase the museum collection, but is also a center for research, scientific work, and teaching. It includes over 45,000 documents, including 1,000 historic and valuable books and magazines. The books range from subjects of military affairs, general history, military history, military technology, hand and fire weapons, medals, uniforms, photography and art, and conservation efforts. Inside the library are 36,000 volumes of monographs from 1851 to the present, 1,000 rare books from the 16th century to 1850, about 7,500 service regulations from the Prussian and Saxon army, as well as newspapers and magazines both past and present. Use of the library is available to military personnel and library employees. Non-military members are granted access to the reading room if they apply ahead of time via telephone or through written application.

=== Gallery ===
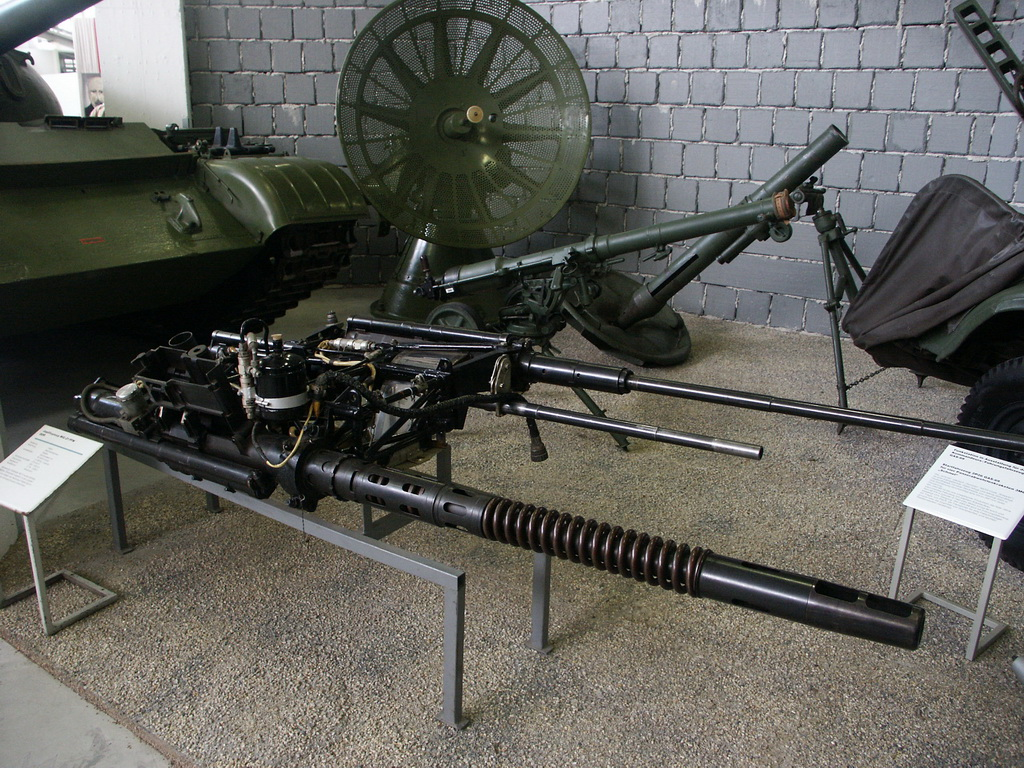
Military technology shown in the museum

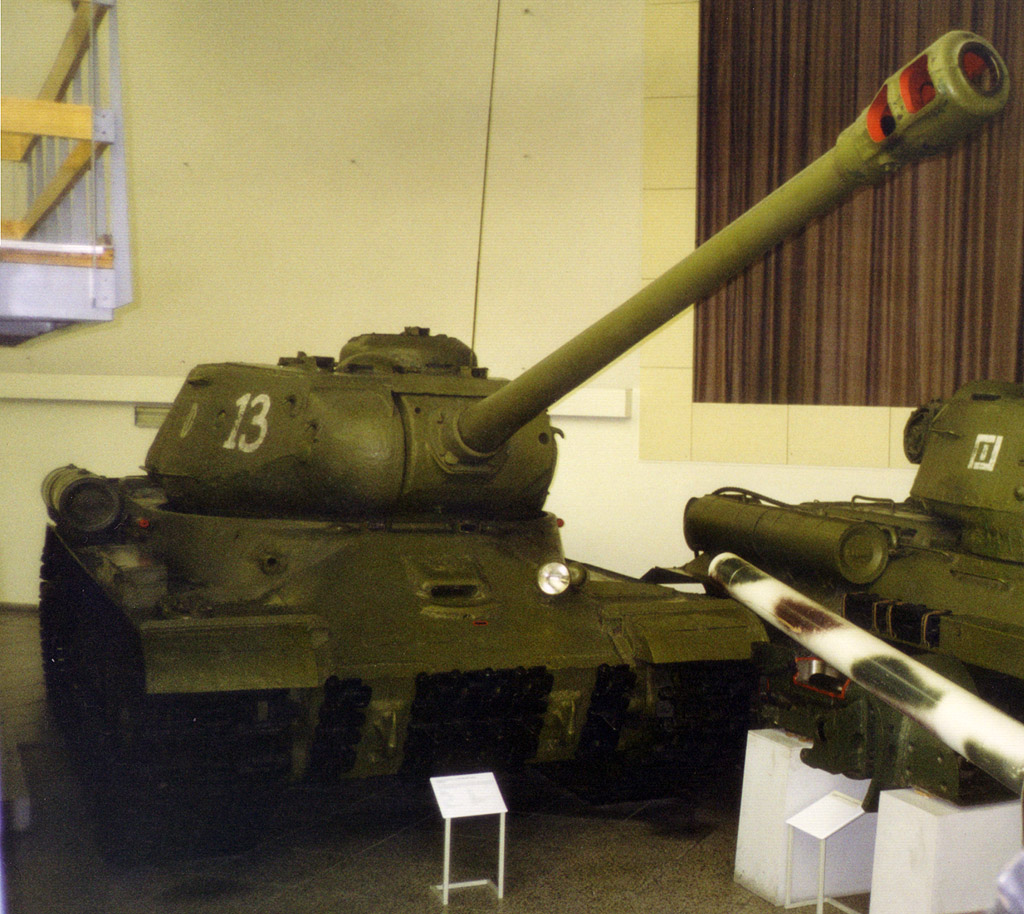
Soviet IS-2 tank on display

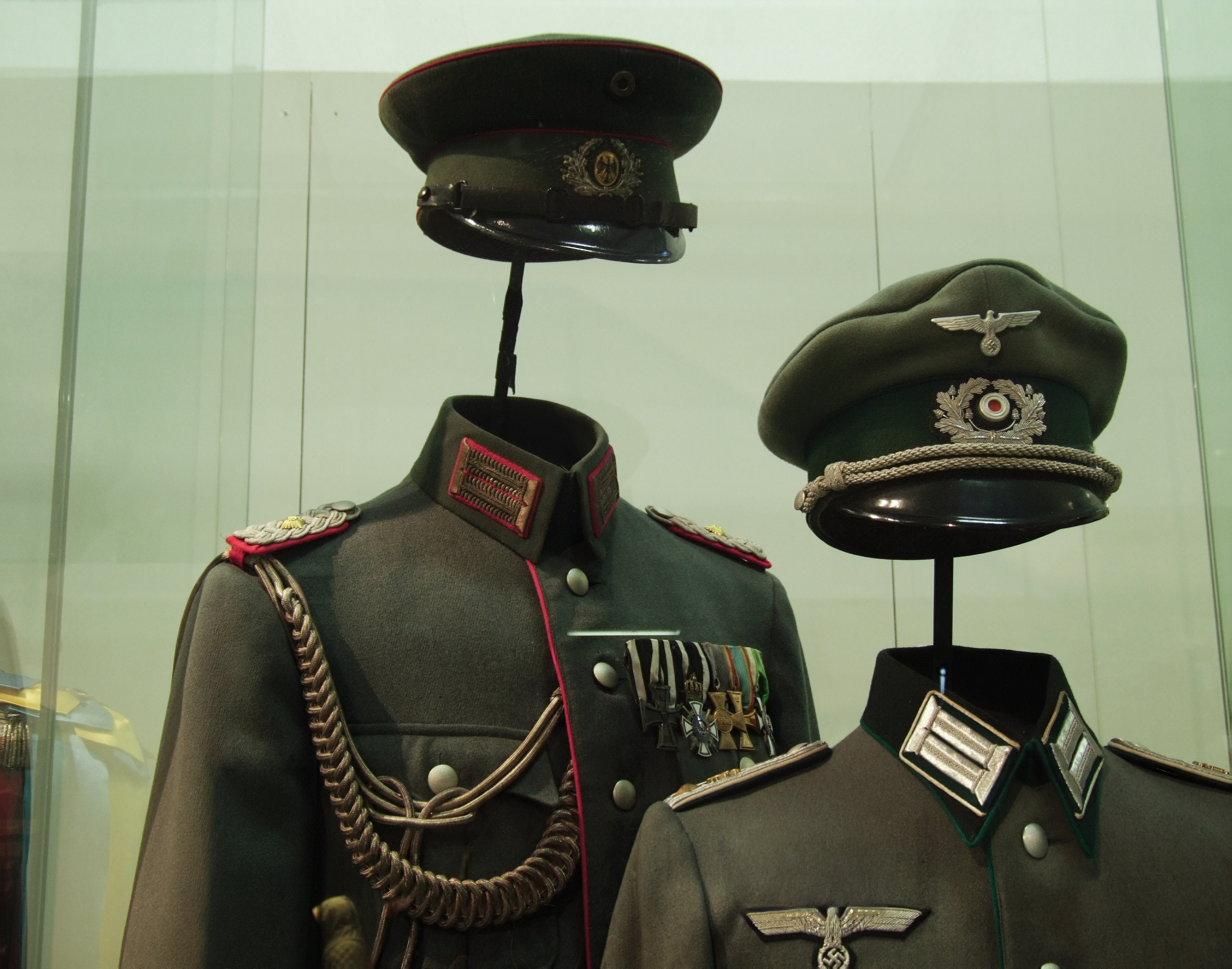
German military uniforms

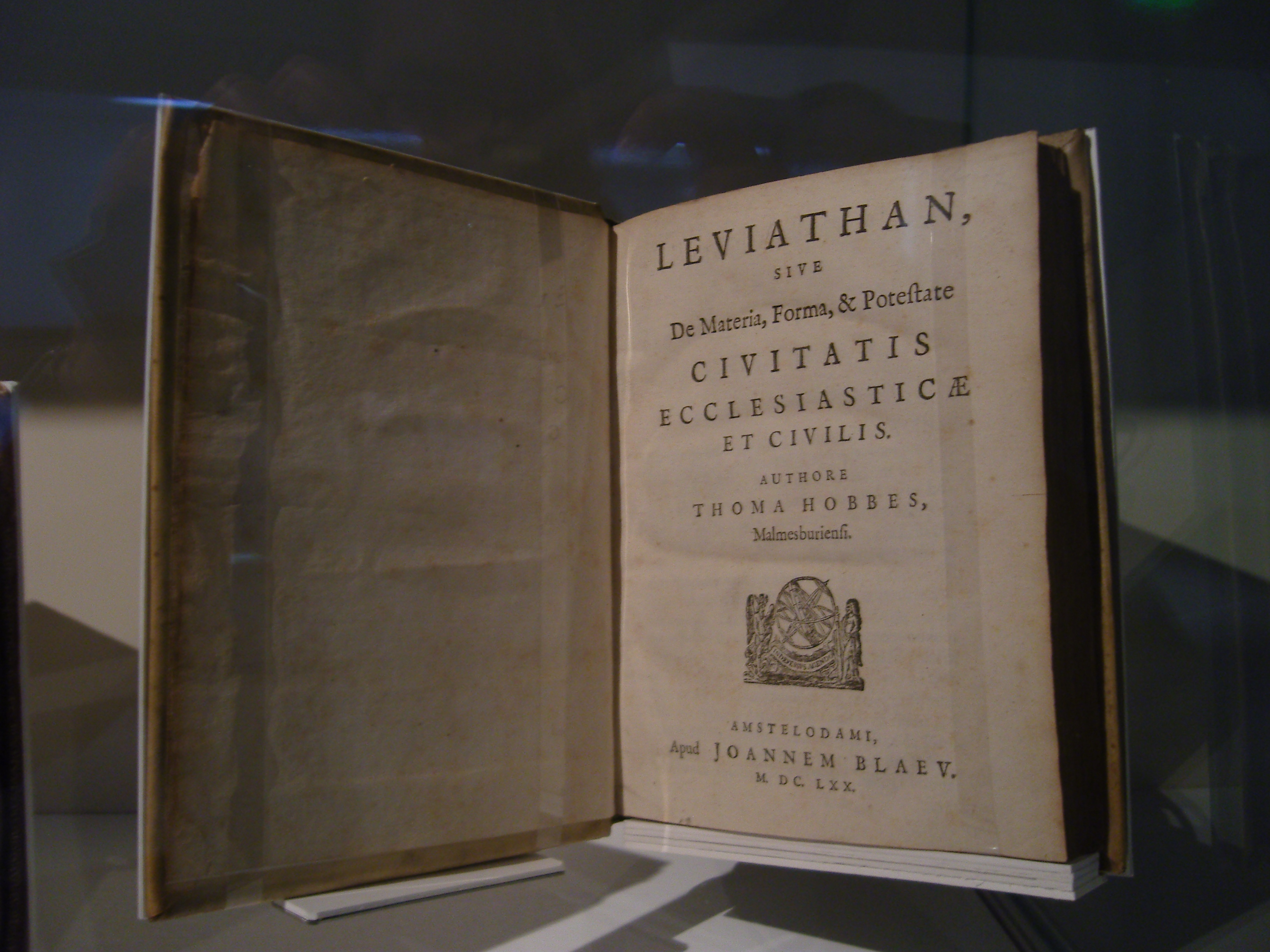
A copy of Hobbes' "Leviathan" on display

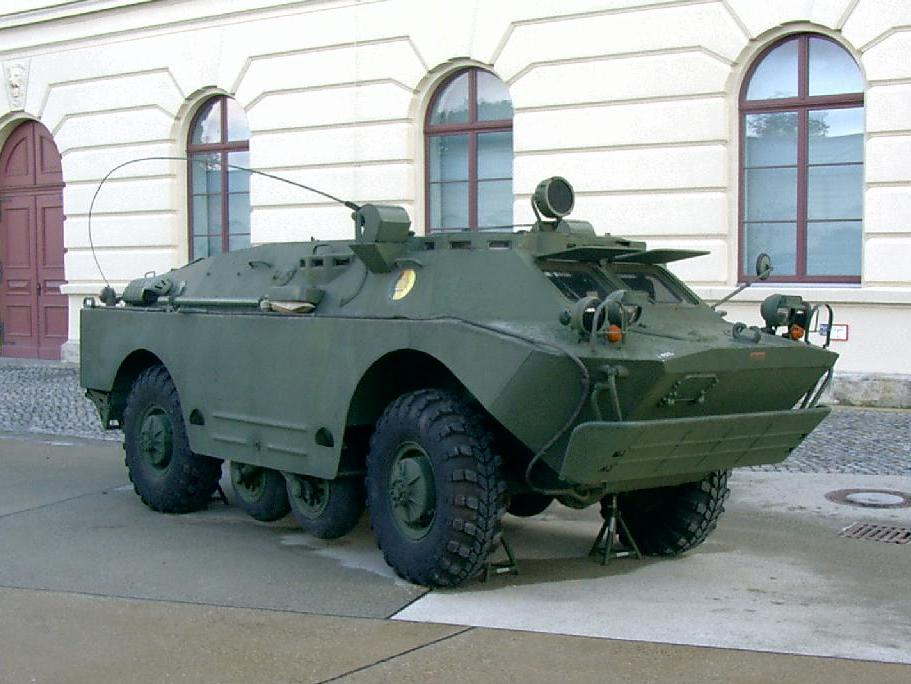
Armored scout car BRDM-2 of the National People's Army

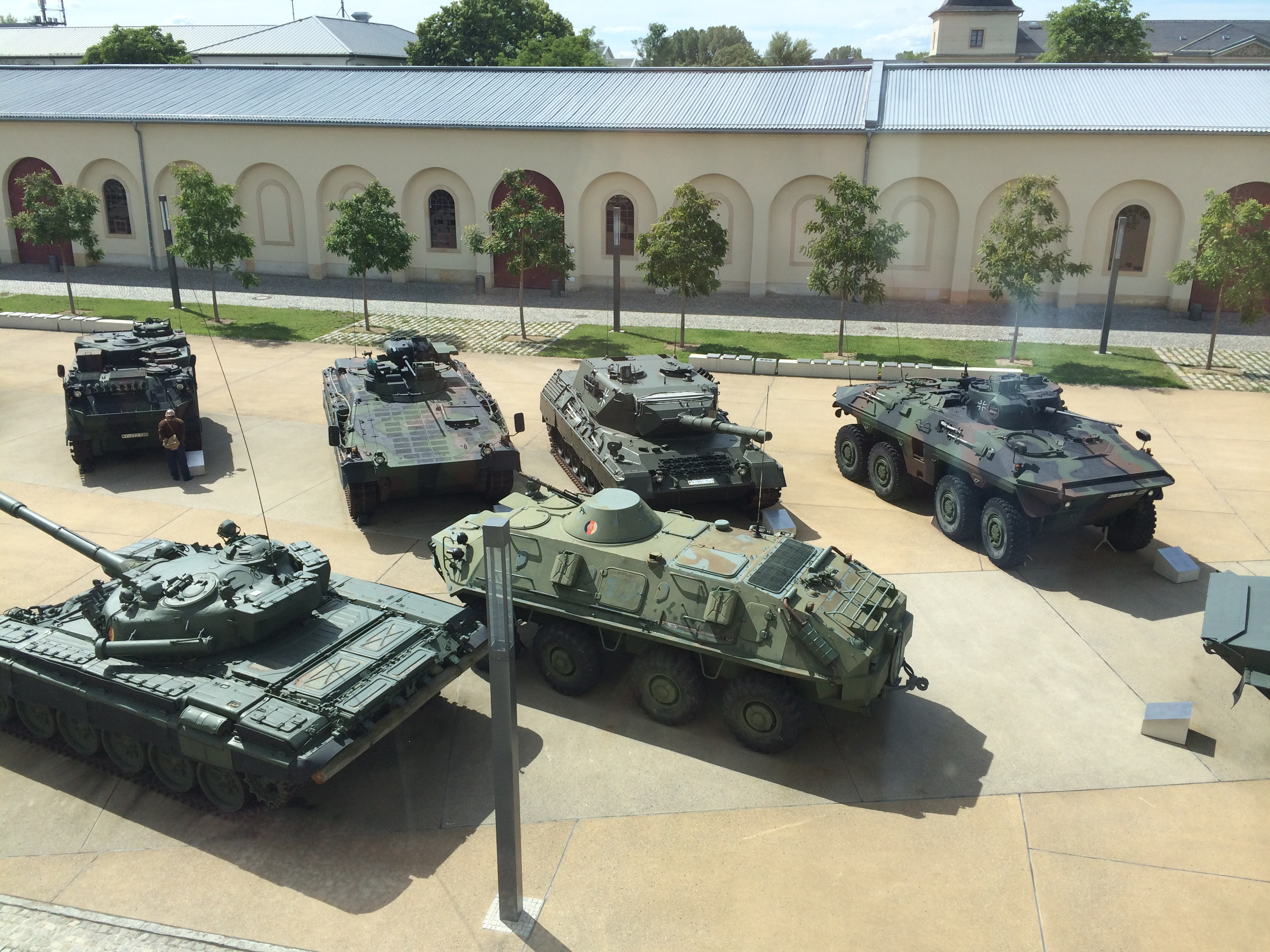
Clockwise from top left: M113, Marder (IFV), Leopard 1, Spähpanzer Luchs, BTR-60, T-72

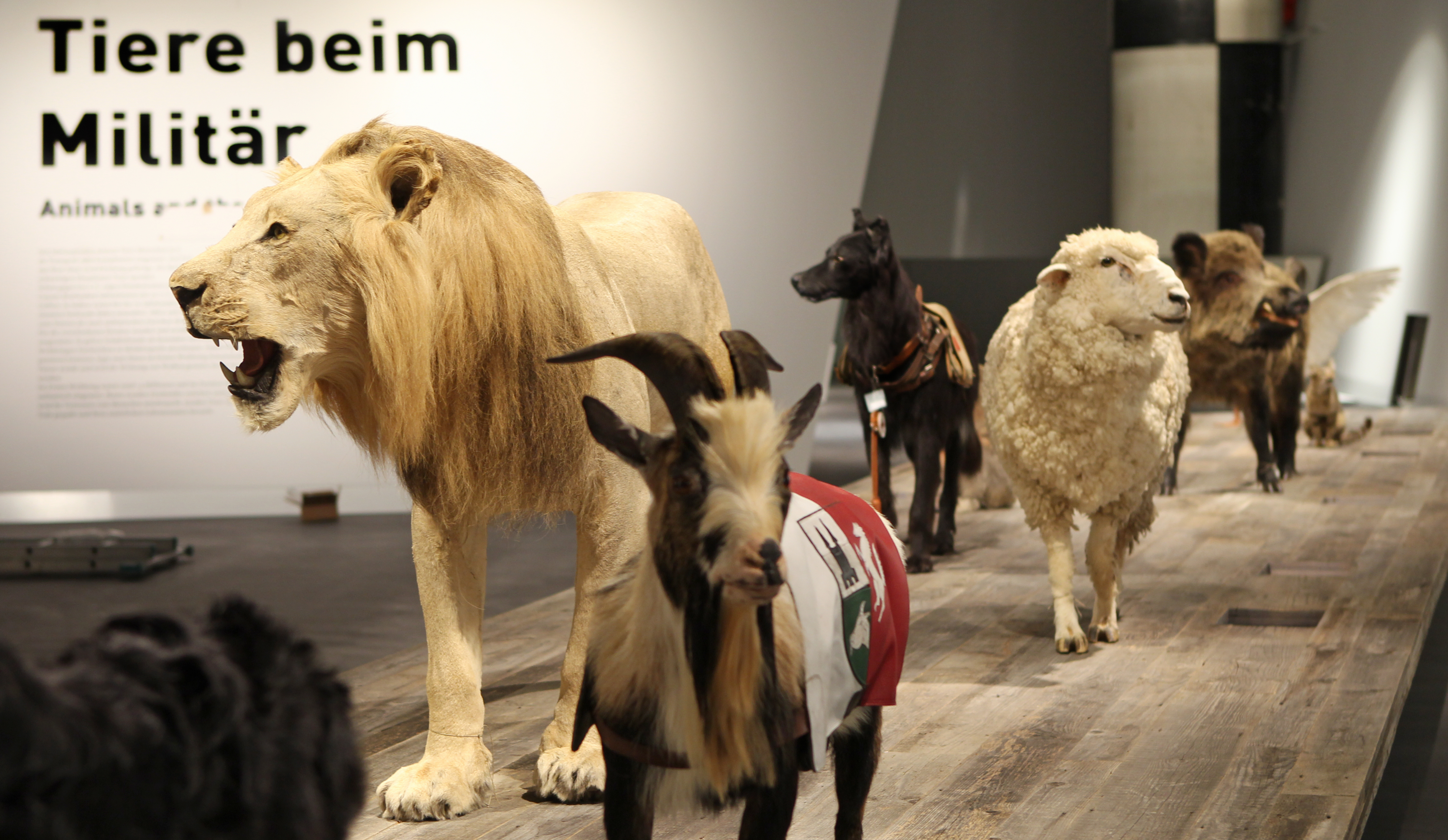
A display on animals in the military

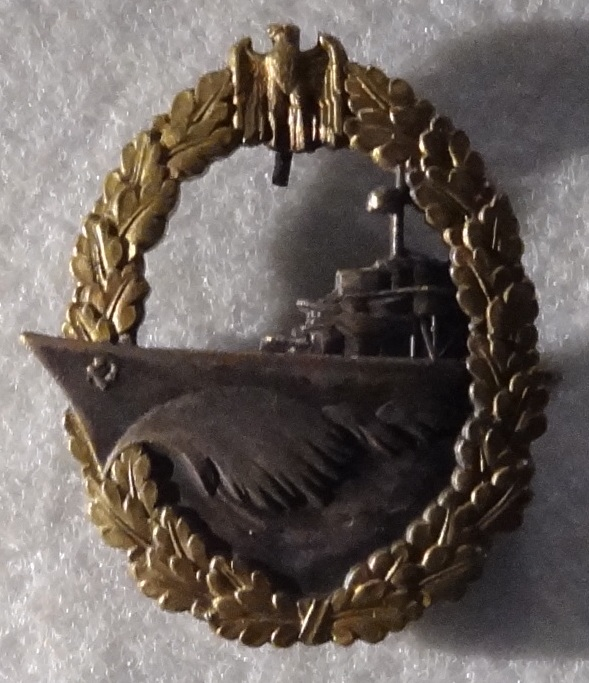
Destroyer War Badge from 1957

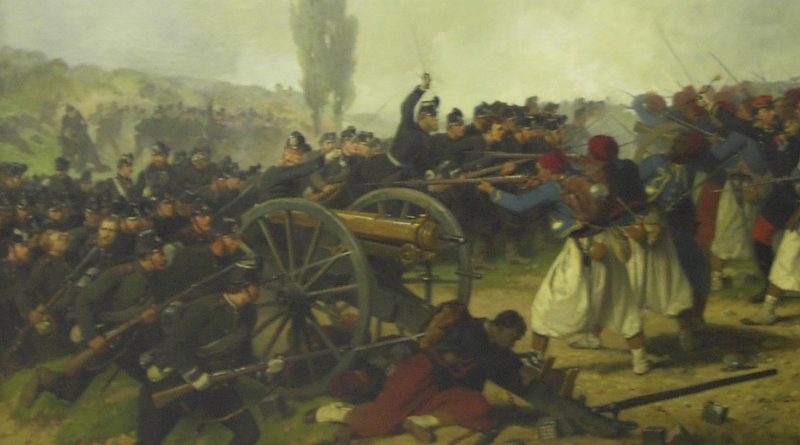
Painting of the Royal Saxon Army

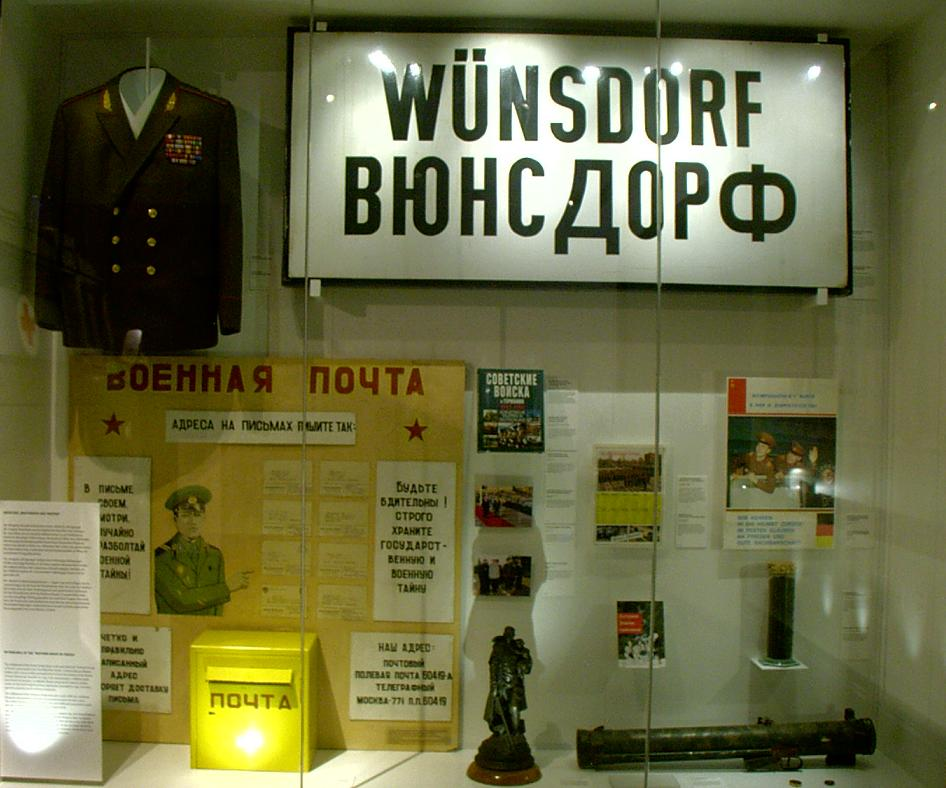
Display case of Soviet forces in Germany

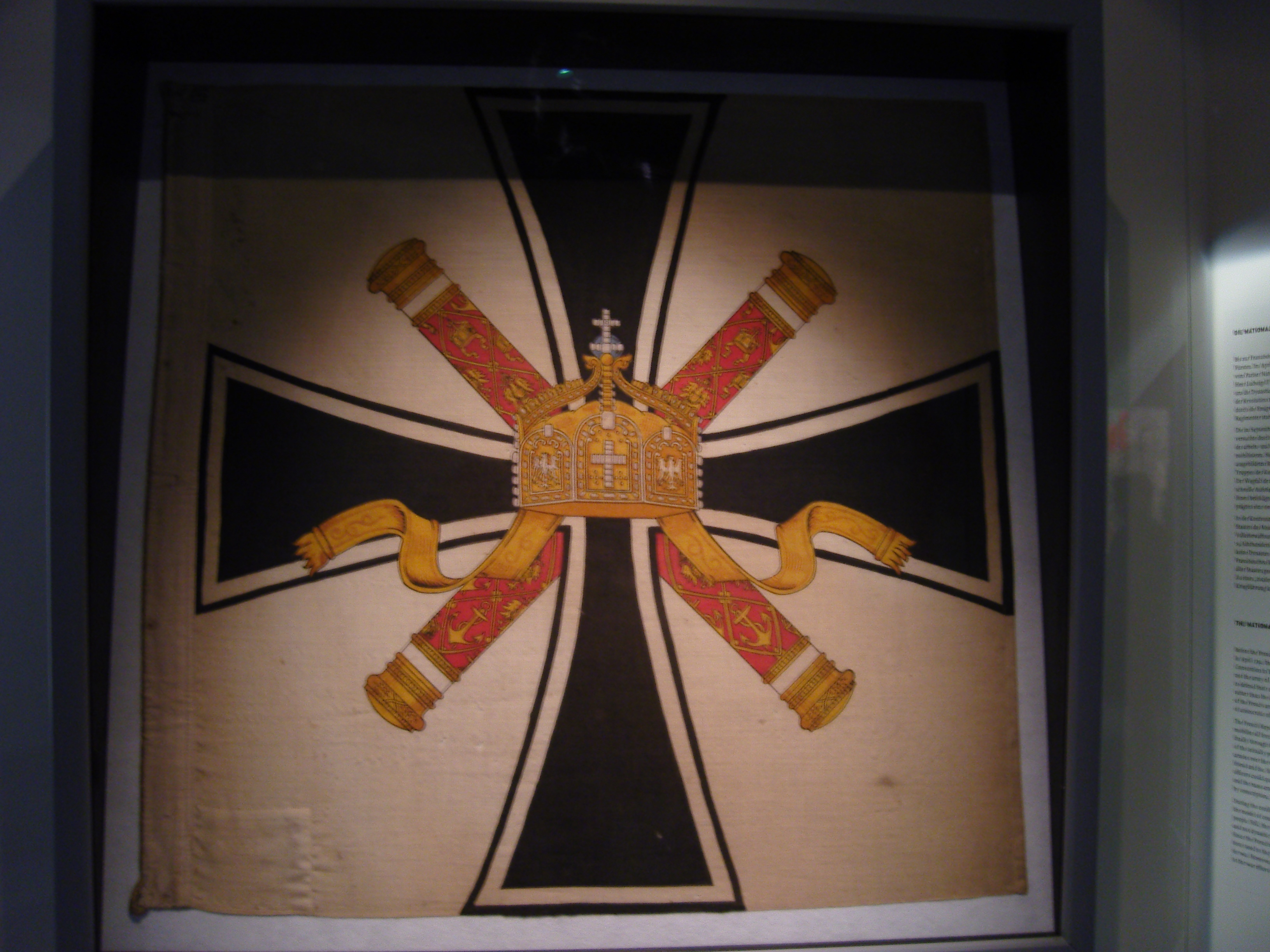
The flag of the Grand Admiral of the Imperial Navy

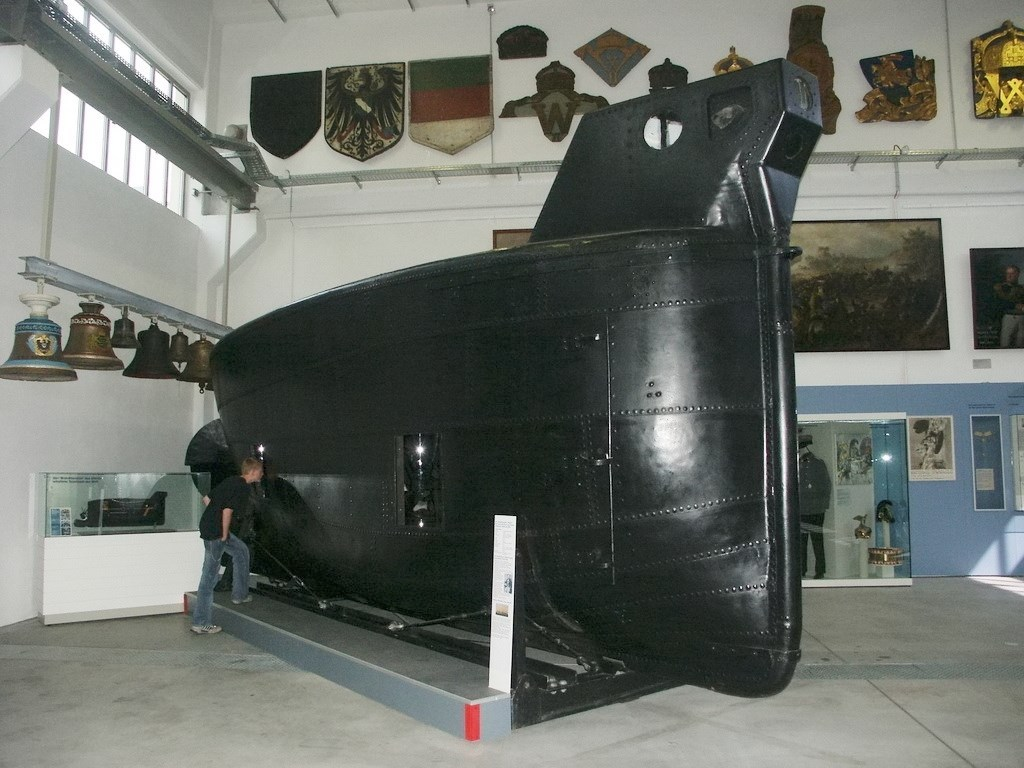
The original Brandtaucher, Germany's first submarine

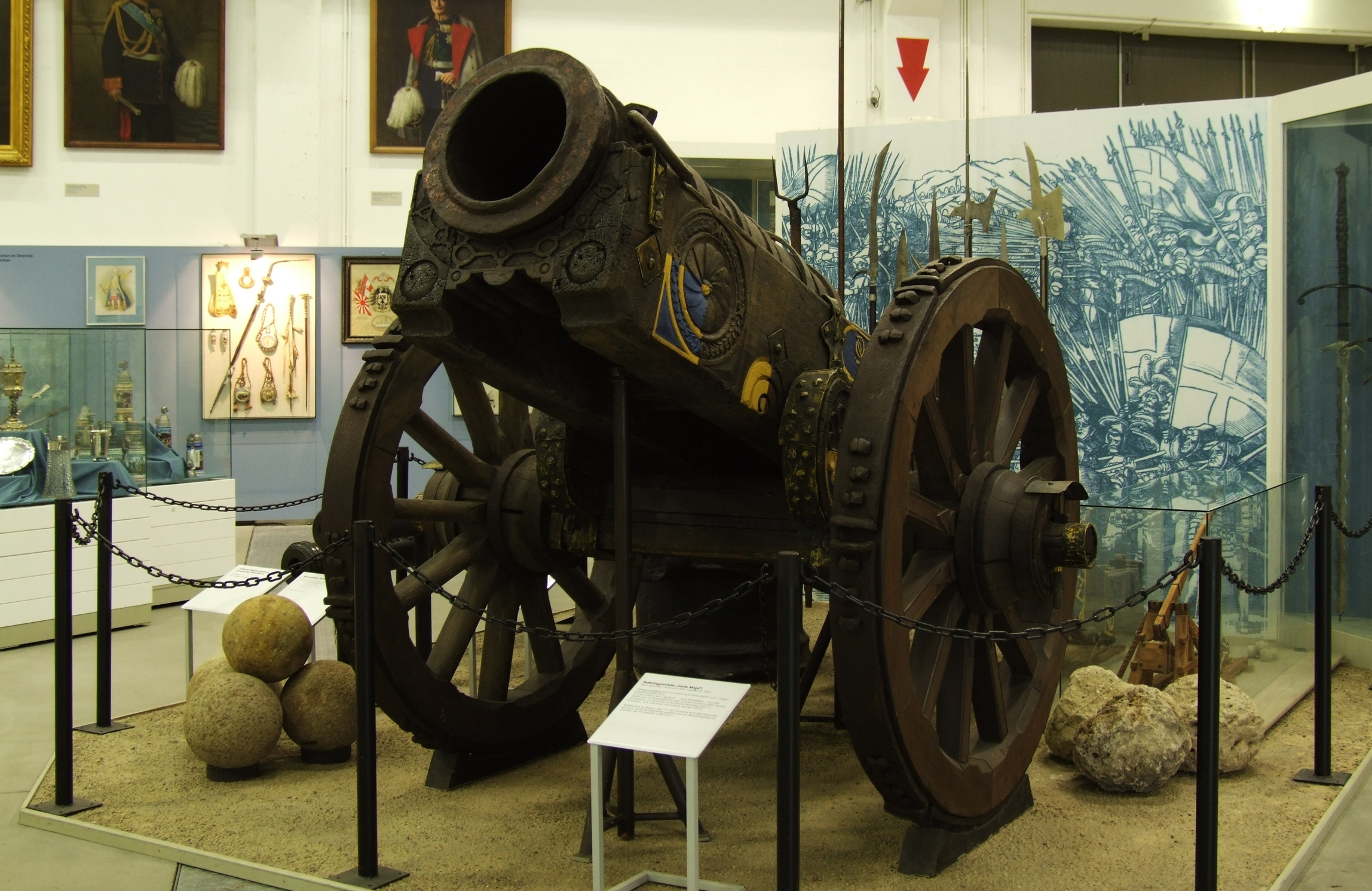
The rod ring gun, "Faule Magd", from approx. 1450

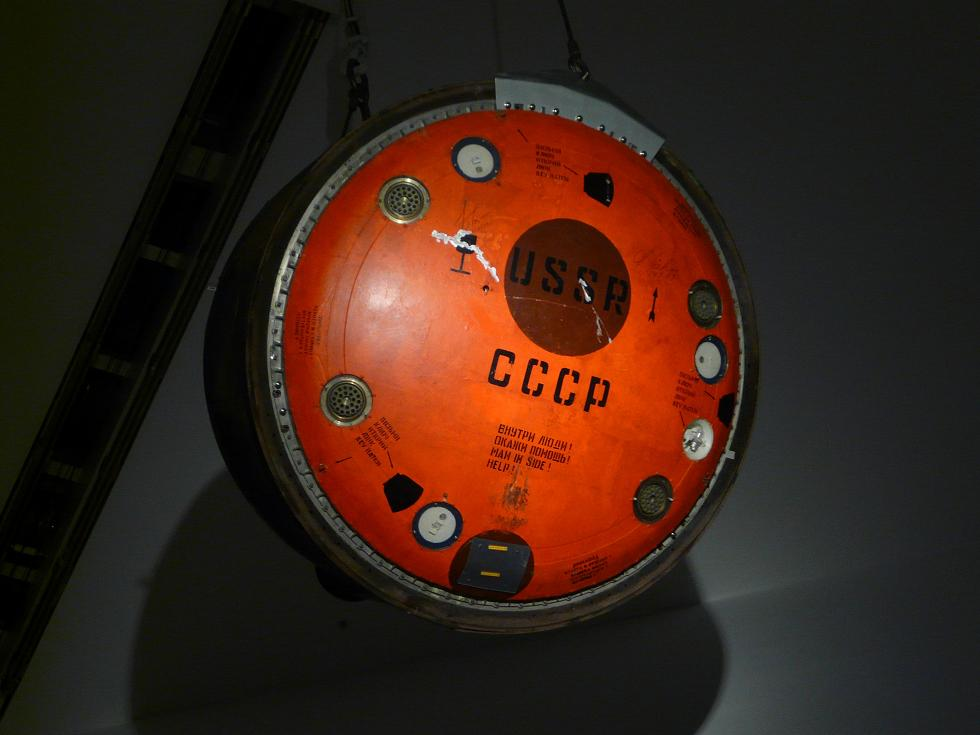
The Soviet-East German Soyuz 29 capsule from 1978

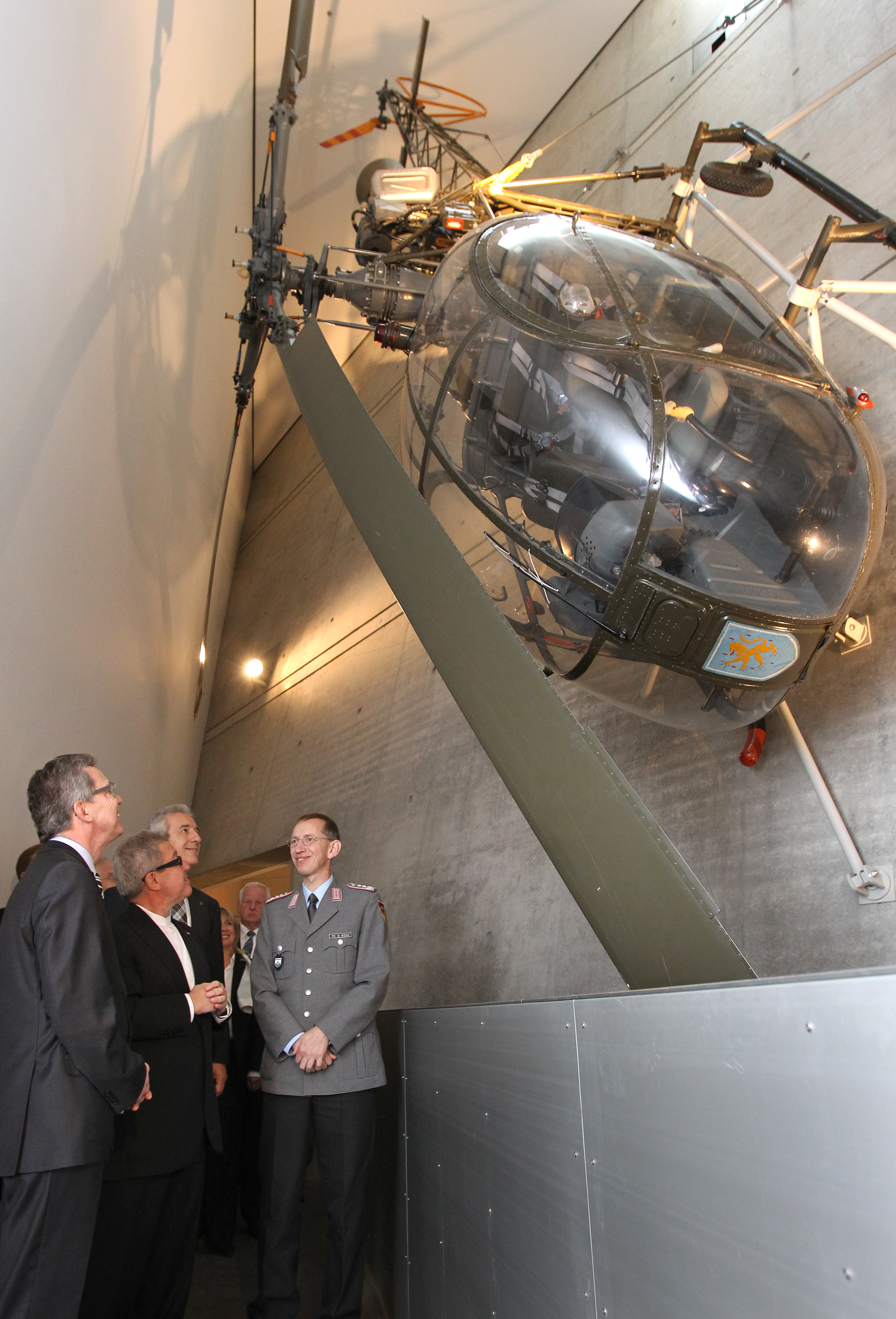
An Alouette helicopter

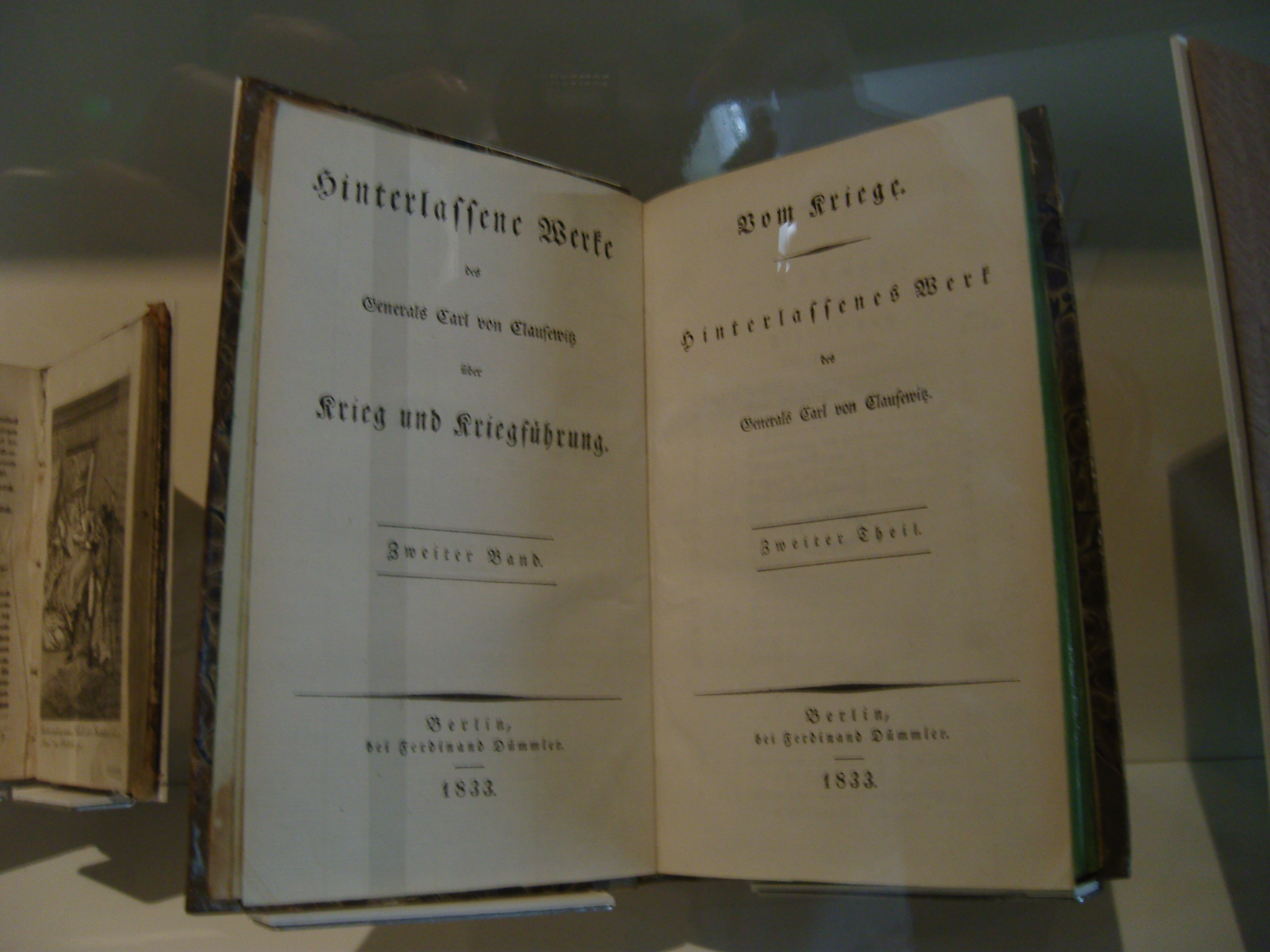
"On War" by Carl von Clausewitz

== See also ==
- Deutsches Panzermuseum, German tank museum in Munster

== Bibliography ==
- Pieken, Gorch; Rogg, Matthias (2012). The Bundeswehr Museum of Military History (Militärhistorisches Museum der Bundeswehr) - Exhibition Guide - . Dresden, Sandstein-Verlag, ISBN 978-3-95498-000-0.
- Stapfer, Hans-Heiri (1991). "In a 'New' Country". Air Enthusiast. No. 44. pp. 57–61. ISSN 0143-5450.
- Van Uffelen, Chris. Contemporary Museums - Architecture, History, Collections, Braun Publishing, 2010, ISBN 978-3-03768-067-4, pages 232–233.
