= SG Mickten =

German football club

SG Mickten were a football club from the Mickten district of Dresden. They were a predecessor side to the modern Dresdner SC, not to be confused with the original Dresdner SC that won some national titles before World War II. They were a Stasi sponsored team like most Dresdner teams back then and East German teams. They never managed to win any trophies though.
