= Pieschen =

Quarter of Dresden, Germany

- Quarter
- Interactive map of Pieschen
- Country: Germany
- State: Saxony
- City: Dresden

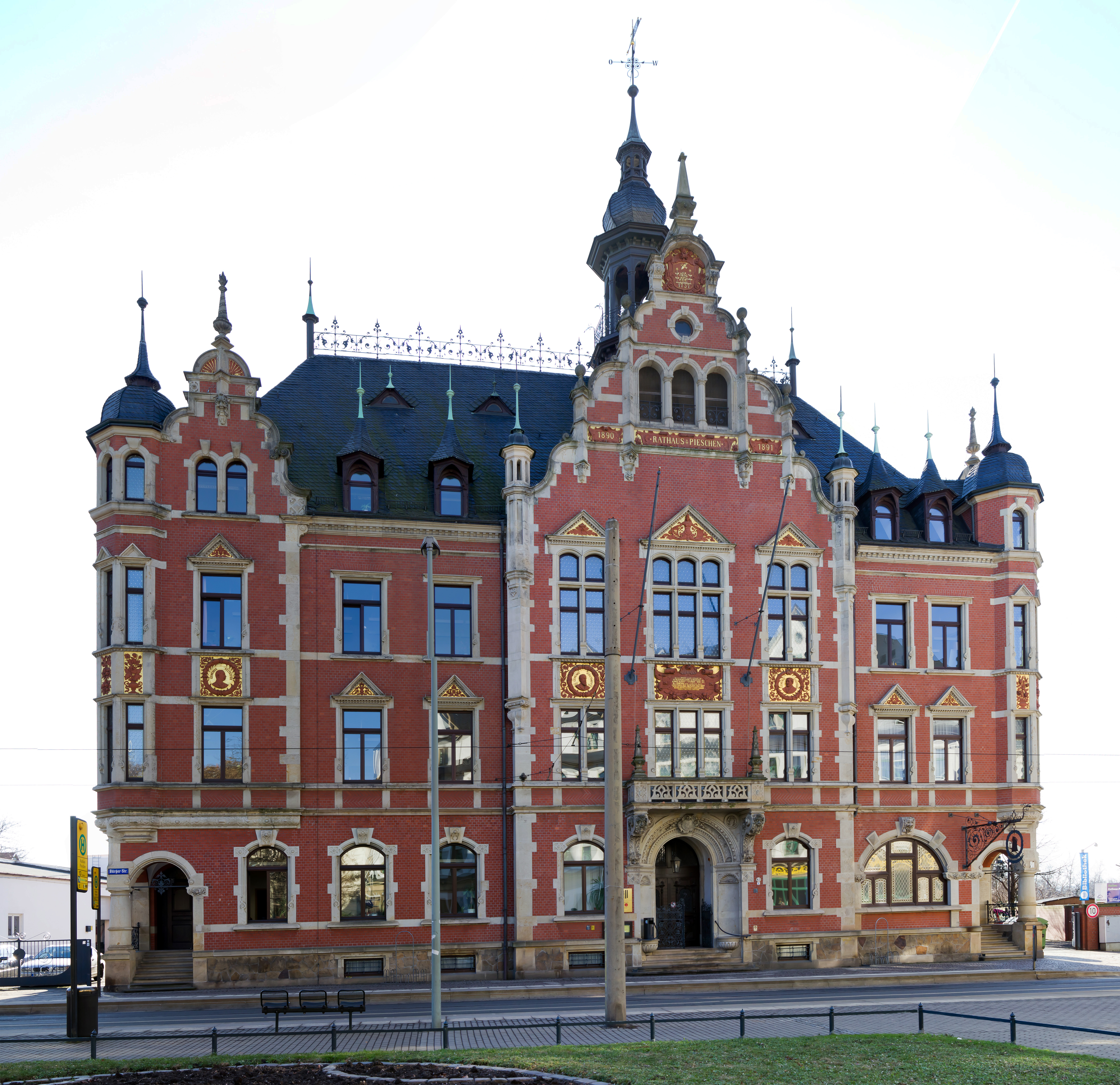
Pieschen city hall

Pieschen is a quarter of the city of Dresden located on the northern bank of the Elbe River in the German state of Saxony.
