= Niederwartha station =

Railway station in Germany

Niederwartha

General information
- Location: Am Fährhaus; 01156 Dresden; Saxony; Germany
- Coordinates: 51.094628°N 13.606078°E
- System: Hp
- Owner: DB Netz
- Operator: DB Station&Service
- Lines: Berlin–Dresden railway (KBS 225)
- Platforms: 2 side platforms
- Tracks: 2
- Train operators: DB Regio Südost

Other information
- Station code: 4537
- DS100 code: DNI
- IBNR: 8012503
- Category: 6
- Fare zone: VVO
- Website: www.bahnhof.de

Services
Preceding station	DB Regio Nordost	Following station
Cossebaude towards Dresden Hbf	RB 31	Radebeul-Naundorf towards Elsterwerda-Biehla
Location
- Location within Saxony

Niederwartha station is a railway station in the Niederwartha district in the capital city of Dresden, Saxony, Germany.
