= Radebeul-Naundorf station =

Railway station in Germany

Radebeul-Naundorf
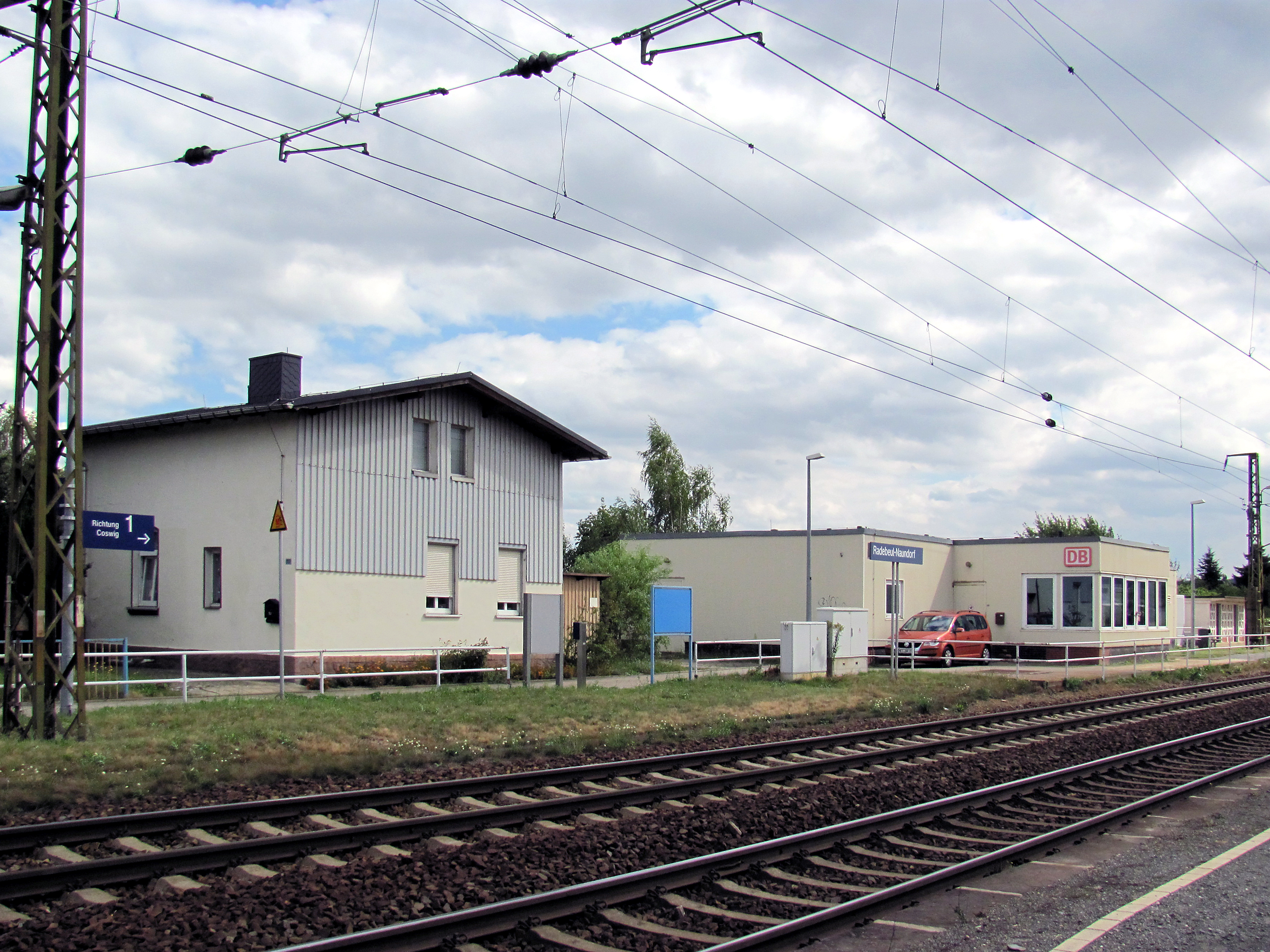
- Radebeul-Naundorf station in 2012

General information
- Location: Kötitzer Straße/Horkenweg; 01445 Radebeul; Saxony; Germany
- Coordinates: 51.110378°N 13.599330°E
- System: Hp
- Owner: DB Netz
- Operator: DB Station&Service
- Lines: Berlin–Dresden railway (KBS 225)
- Platforms: 2 side platforms
- Tracks: 2
- Train operators: DB Regio Nordost

Other information
- Station code: 5086
- DS100 code: DRBN
- IBNR: 8013490
- Category: 6
- Fare zone: VVO
- Website: www.bahnhof.de

Services
| Preceding station | DB Regio Nordost | Following station |
|---|---|---|
| Niederwartha towards Dresden Hbf | RB 31 | Coswig (b Dresden) towards Elsterwerda-Biehla |
Location
- Location within Saxony

Radebeul-Naundorf station is a railway station in the Naundorf district in the Große Kreisstadt of Radebeul, Saxony, Germany.
