= Dresden-Stetzsch station =

Railway station in Dresden, Germany

Dresden-Stetzsch

General information
- Location: Am Urnenfeld; 01157 Dresden; Saxony; Germany
- Coordinates: 51.080716°N 13.651065°E
- System: Hp
- Owner: DB Netz
- Operator: DB Station&Service
- Lines: Berlin–Dresden railway (KBS 225)
- Platforms: 2 side platforms
- Tracks: 2
- Train operators: DB Regio Südost

Other information
- Station code: 1357
- DS100 code: DSTT
- IBNR: 8011425
- Category: 6
- Fare zone: VVO
- Website: www.bahnhof.de

Services
Preceding station	DB Regio Nordost	Following station
Dresden-Kemnitz towards Dresden Hbf	RB 31	Cossebaude towards Elsterwerda-Biehla
Location
- Location within Saxony

Dresden-Stetzsch station is a railway station in the Stetzsch district in the capital city of Dresden, Saxony, Germany.
