= Dresden-Friedrichstadt station =

Railway station in Dresden, Germany

Dresden Friedrichstadt
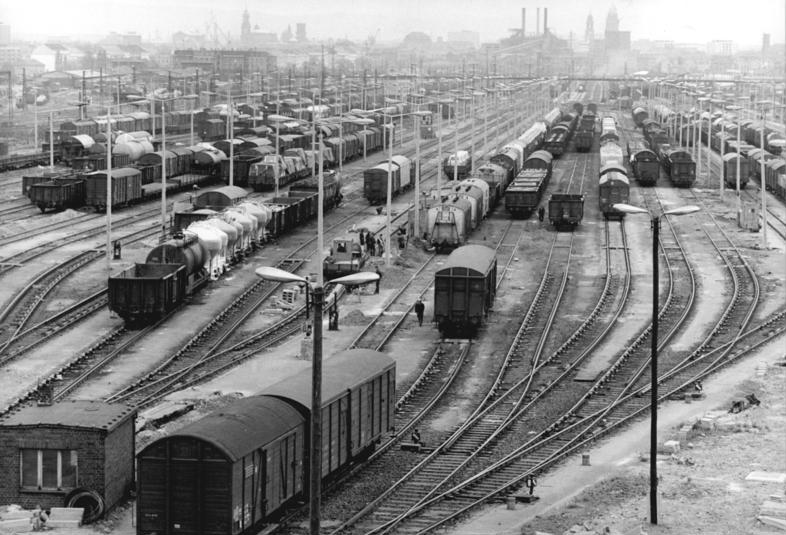
- The marshalling yard tracks in 1980

General information
- Location: Waltherstraße 36, Dresden, Saxony; Germany
- Coordinates: 51°03′20″N 13°42′15″E
- Line: Berlin–Dresden (KBS 240)
- Platforms: 2

Construction
- Accessible: Yes

Other information
- Station code: 1348
- DS100 code: DF
- IBNR: 8013475
- Category: 6
- Website: www.bahnhof.de

History
- Opened: 17 June 1875 (Berliner Bahnhof); 1 May 1894 (marshalling yard)

Services
Preceding station	DB Regio Nordost	Following station
Dresden Hbf Terminus	RB 31	Dresden-Cotta towards Elsterwerda-Biehla
Location

Dresden-Friedrichstadt station is a freight yard that is, along with the two passenger stations of Dresden Hauptbahnhof and Dresden-Neustadt, a central component of the railway node of Dresden in the German state of Saxony. The station precinct, which is located in the Dresden district of Friedrichstadt, also includes a locomotive depot (Bahnbetriebswerk Dresden) and a regional passenger station.

The Berliner Bahnhof, that is the terminus on the line from Berlin, was opened on the site in 1875. A marshalling yard was built from 1890 as a gravity yard, along with a repair shop (Ausbesserungswerk)—which was called the Reichsbahnausbesserungswerk Dresden from 1920—and the locomotive depot. After major destruction as a result of the air raids on Dresden during the Second World War, rebuilding began in 1945. By the turn of the century, its significance had diminished. Until the end of hump operations in 2009, it was along with the Leipzig-Engelsdorf marshalling yard, the only remaining yard in Saxony to handle wagonload freight. After the turn of the millennium, it was redeveloped as a yard for the transhipment of combined transport.

== Location ==
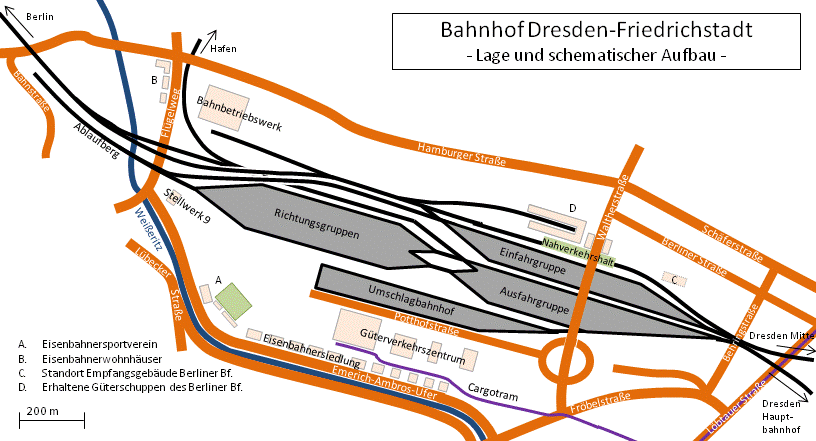
Location and schematic structure

The freight yard is located west of the historic old town (Altstadt). The yard extend over two kilometres from east to west. It extends over the entire south-western part of the district of Friedrichstadt and as a result it is largely located in the old town. Its north-western point is in the middle of the district of Cotta; in the southeast it almost reaches into the district of Wilsdruffer Vorstadt, which is part of the old town.

The canalised Weißeritz flows south of the yard towards the Elbe, which it reaches shortly after it has passed under the westernmost part of the marshalling yard. The eastern part of the yard is also close to this river, which runs from the Ore Mountains (Erzgebirge), or its former bed, making it prone to flooding.

The yard is officially located 230 metres from the end of the Berlin–Dresden railway, which extends in the city from its centre to the Elbe bridge in Niederwartha and Cossebaude. It is accessed from the junction of the Leipzig–Dresden railway with the line from Berlin to the northwest of Dresden near the border between the towns of Coswig and Radebeul; it is also accessed there by rail freight traffic from Leipzig. The passenger traffic to and from the northwest, for example Dresden S-Bahn services, mainly use the Leipzig line via Pieschen and Dresden-Neustadt station.

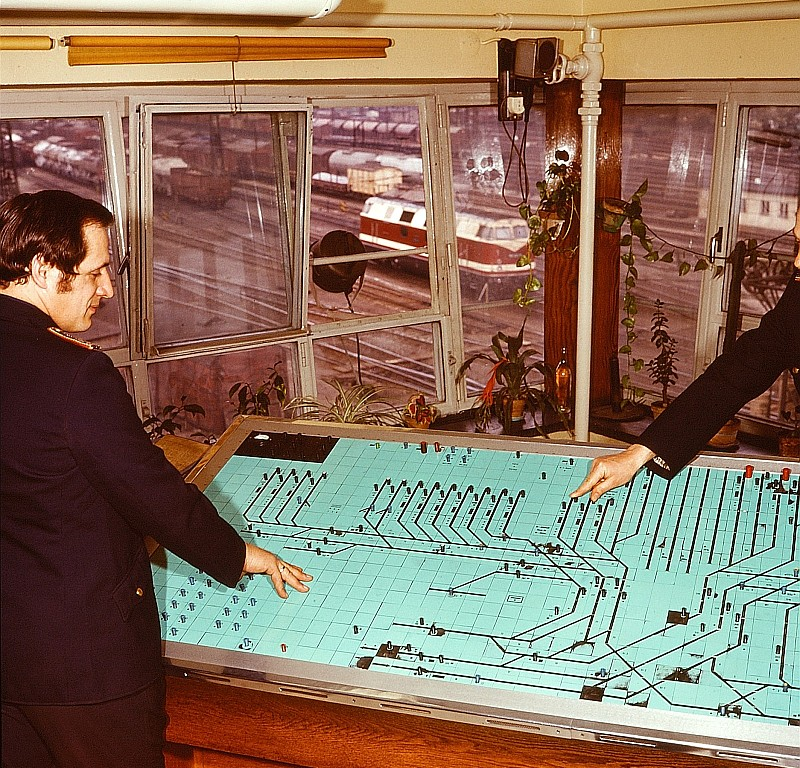
Desk of a class W1 relay interlocking on the eastern side of the yard (1975)

Immediately east of the Dresden-Friedrichstadt yard, the Berlin–Dresden railway meets the inner-city link between the neighbouring stations of Dresden Hauptbahnhof and Dresden-Neustadt at a wye junction. This connects the line with the Dresden–Děčín, Dresden–Werdau and Dresden–Görlitz railways. The next station away from the city is Dresden-Cotta station. To the west of the station, a short line branches to the north to the river port of Alberthafen and is used exclusively for the transport of goods. This is located just one kilometre north of the yard and the two facilities work together to handle multimodal transport. Among other things, the port has had a roll-on/roll-off facility able to handle a permissible maximum load of 500 tonnes since 2007.

== Function and infrastructure ==
=== Freight traffic ===
The freight yard handles rail freight traffic in the following types of traffic:

- changes of locomotives for cross-border block train traffic and
- transhipment of containers and swap bodies in combined transport.

The main part of the yard is a one-sided marshalling yard with 34 tracks. Until the decommissioning of the hump, it was used for the division and assembly of trains in wagonload freight. Its highest point is slightly west of signal box 9. Shunting locomotives pushed the trains with decoupled wagons onto the track over the hump from which they rolled off and were routed by the setting of points to a target track.

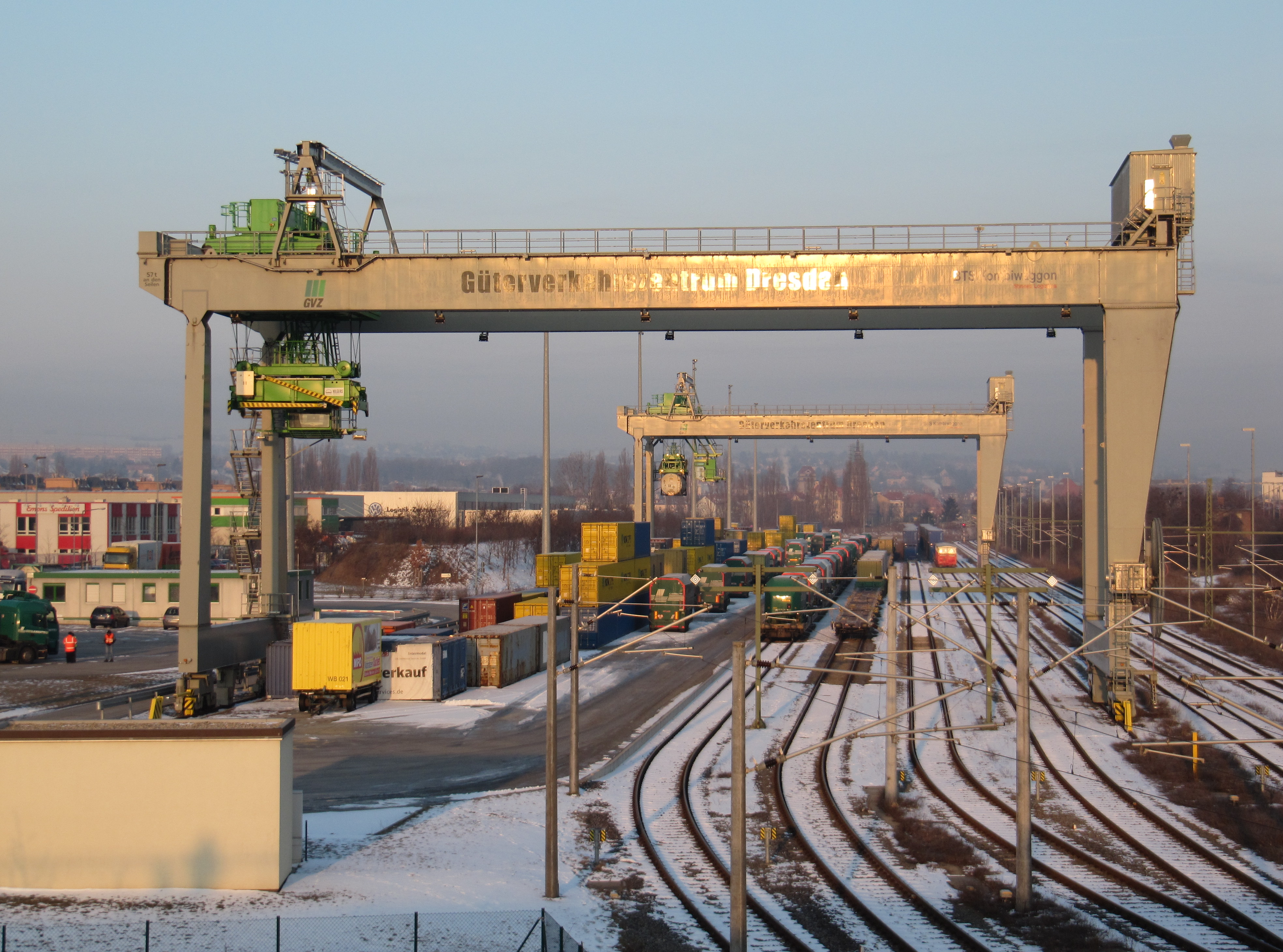
The transhipment yard in the Dresden freight traffic centre

A modern freight village lies immediately south of the station area on Potthoffstraße. The transhipment yard for combined transport has two entry and exit tracks, four loading tracks with adjoining storage areas and two gantry cranes. The transhipment yard can handle a maximum of 90,000 containers or swap bodies annually.

=== Passenger traffic ===
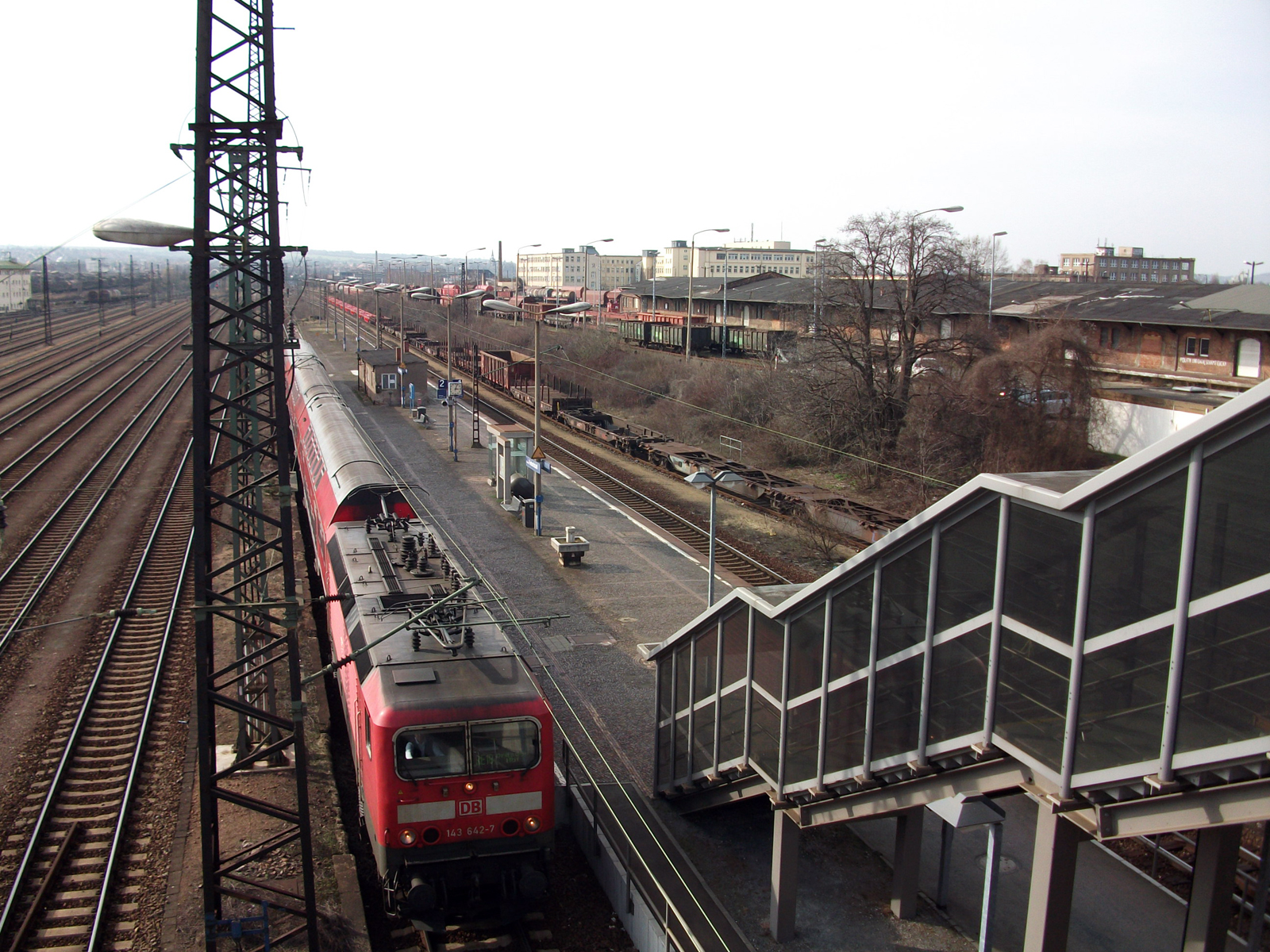
The platform of the local station with access from the Waltherstraße bridge

A small part of the station is used for passenger operations. This is served by a local transport service, the RB 31 from Dresden Hbf to Elsterwerda via Coswig and Großenhain, but it is not served by the Dresden S-Bahn. There are few possibilities for transferring to/from public transport services operated by the Dresdner Verkehrsbetriebe, the public transport company. North of the station, the Waltherstraße stop is served by bus route 94, which runs between Postplatz and Niederwartha, and by tram line 1 from Leutewitz to Prohlis. The Semmelweisstraße stop on tram line 2 from Gorbitz to Kleinzschachwitz lies south of the station.

Line	Route	Interval (min)	Operator
RB 31	Dresden Hbf – Dresden-Friedrichstadt – Coswig (b Dresden) (– Großenhain Cottb – Elsterwerda – Elsterwerda-Biehla)	60	DB Regio Nordost

== History ==
=== Berliner Bahnhof (Berlin line station) ===
Before the building of the first station in Friedrichstadt, it was the location of the powder magazines of the Saxon Army; they were relocated with the concentration of the barracks of Dresden in Albertstadt on the edge of the Prießnitz flood plain. The first station on the site was the Berliner Bahnhof (the terminus of the line to Berlin) and its entrance building was on Berliner Straße. This station, which was built between 1873 and 1875, was the terminus of the then private Berlin-Dresdener Eisenbahn-Gesellschaft (Berlin-Dresden Railway Company), which built the line between the capitals of Saxony and Prussia. Its other terminus was the Dresdener Bahnhof, 174.2 km away in Berlin. Rail freight and passenger services between Berlin and Dresden began on 17 June 1875. Thus, the line to Berlin is the newest of the five railways ending in Dresden that were built in the 19th century. It was 38 years after the first German long-distance railway was completed from Dresden to Leipzig, which terminated at the Leipziger Bahnhof.

The passenger station consisted of a relatively small entrance building, which was built like a large urban villa in the Romanesque style, next to a 180-metre-long platform and a similarly covered 200 metre-long island platform. Two transit tracks led past the platforms to the then Böhmischen Bahnhof ("Bohemian station"). Just south of it were two more tracks for the use of "excursion trains" that ran to a turntable on the east side. In order to establish a fast road connection to the passenger station, a street was built in the 1870s that was named Berliner Straße after the station.

The freight facilities of the Berliner Bahnhof extended for over 1000 metres. This large area allowed the building of the marshalling yard in the 20th century. Five dead-end tracks, a loading ramp and a transfer crane were used to transport livestock and commodities and four dead-end tracks with two external goods sheds handled general freight traffic. The goods sheds, with large attached freight-handling areas on their eastern side, are still preserved. Between the freight-handling buildings there was a traverser for transferring locomotives between the four tracks. Four wagon turntables linked the tracks to the entrance track. Locomotive maintenance facilities, consisting of a twelve-stall locomotive shed, a watering point and a coal loader were located at the western station exit. The Berliner Bahnhof was already important for freight traffic in the early years. This was a result in particular of the fact that the city council had declared the district of Friedrichstadt to be a factory district in 1878. As a result, important industrial companies, such as the sewing machine manufacturer, Seidel & Naumann, the Dresden flour mill, the Yenidze cigarette factory and the municipal slaughterhouse gradually settled there.

=== Nationalisation and redevelopment planning ===
Due to the financial difficulties of the private railway company, it was taken over by the Prussian state railways in 1877 and, as a result, the Berliner Bahnhof also passed into the possession of the Prussian state in 1887. A year later, the section of the line between Elsterwerda and Dresden, which was largely located in Saxony, was sold to the Royal Saxon State Railways, which operated the station from 1 April 1888.

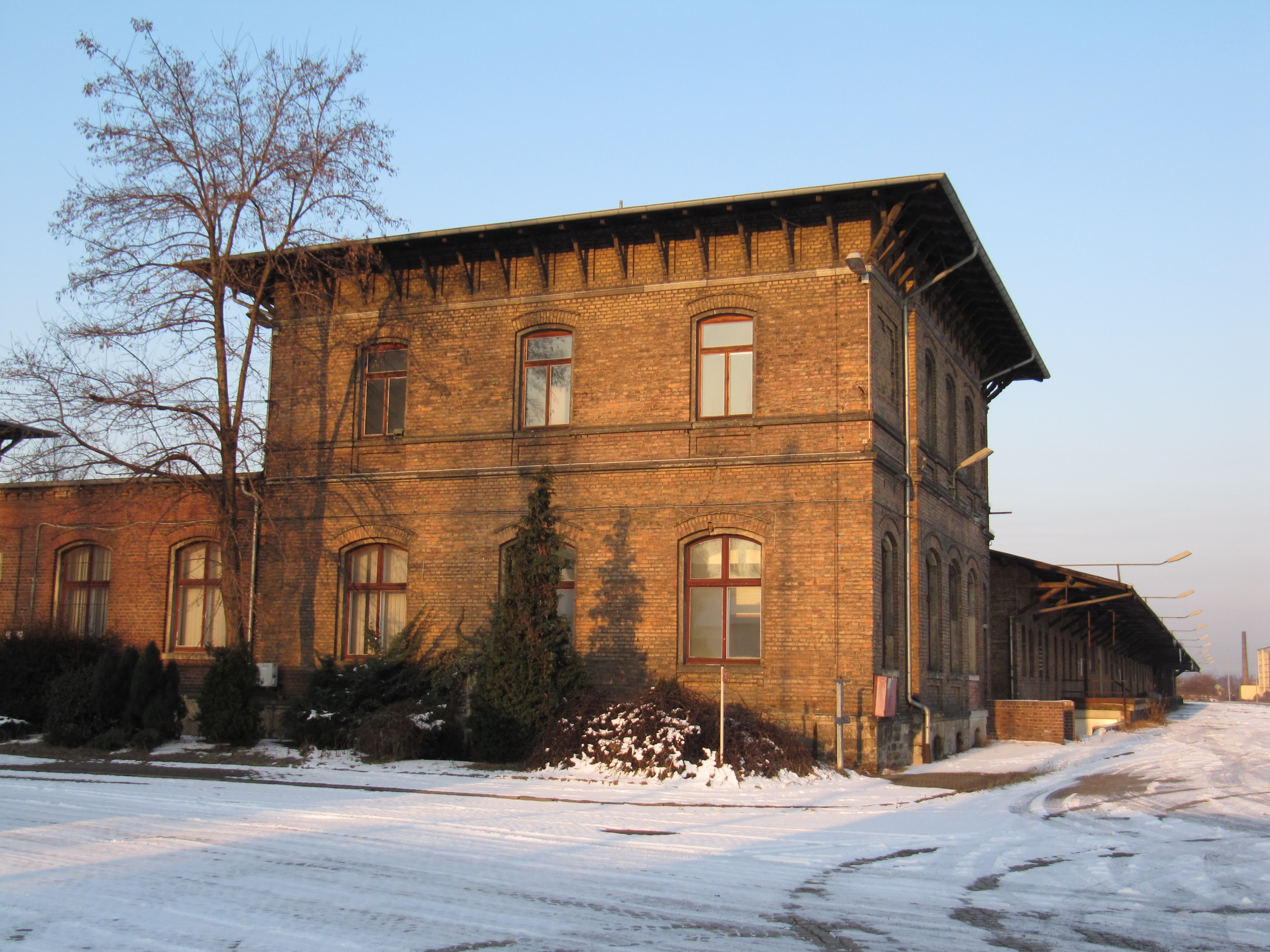
Goods reception shed of the old Berliner Bahnhof with freight-handling areas on Waltherstrasse

In the 1890s, all of Dresden's railway lines, which by then were all state-owned, were connected, creating the Dresden rail node. In the vicinity of the old terminal stations that were no longer required for passenger traffic, facilities dedicated to freight traffic were built, among others at the Leipziger Bahnhof and at the Dresden-Altstadt locomotive depot on the railway to Chemnitz. This process also took place at the Berliner Bahnhof, which closed for passenger traffic when the developing Hauptbahnhof (main station) became the new terminus for passenger trains from Berlin. Several buildings of the old Berliner Bahnhof remained on Waltherstraße, while the station building was later demolished.

=== Reconstruction of the marshalling yard between 1890 and 1894 ===
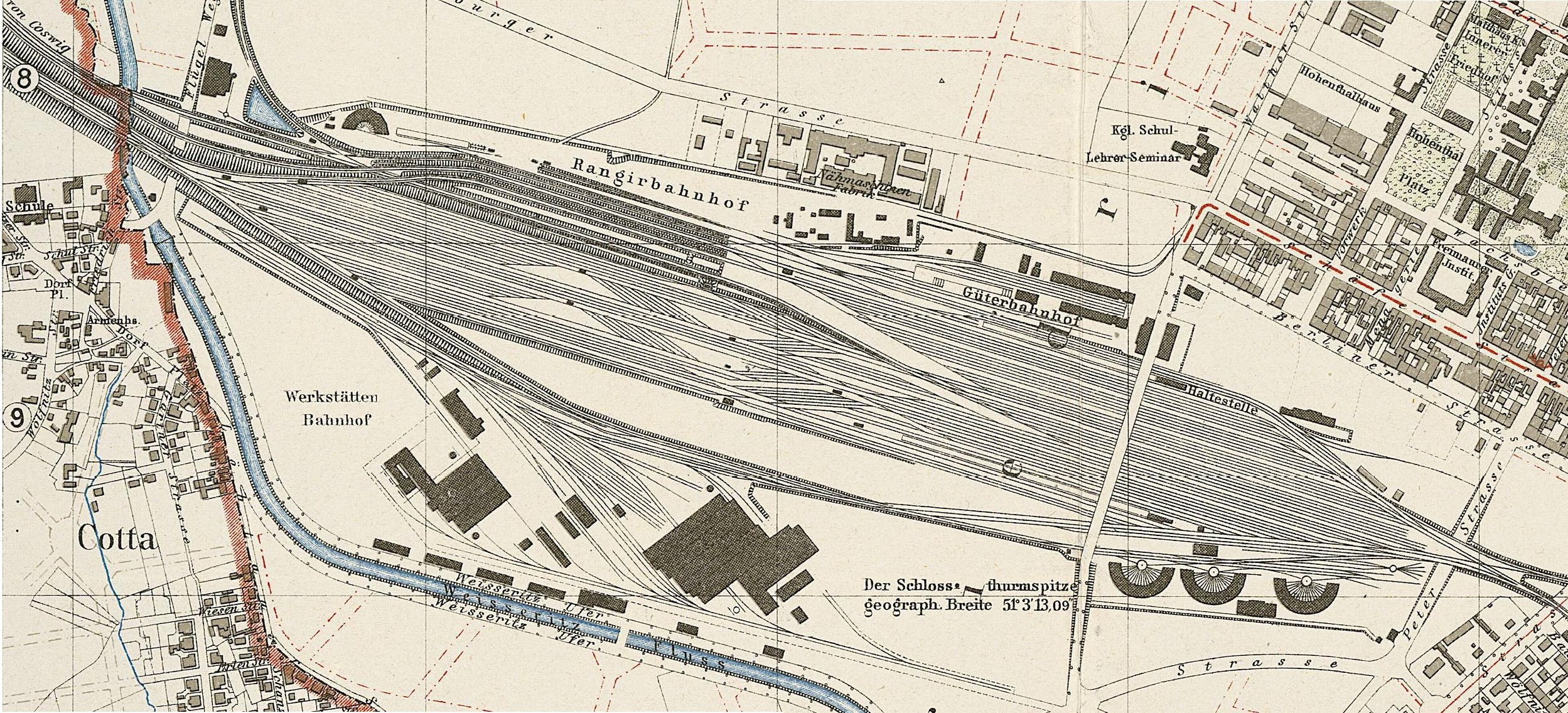
Dresden-Friedrichstadt station in a map from 1900

At about the same time as the closure of the Berliner Bahnhof, the Dresden-Friedrichstadt marshalling yard was completed immediately south of it and it went into service on 1 May 1894. Designed as a one-sided gravity yard, all tracks, apart from the entry and exit groups, lay on a slope of 1:100. Because of its situation in the middle of the flat Elbe valley, a hump was built from the spring of 1891. In order to provide material for it—a total of 1,55 million cubic metres was needed—the neighbouring basin of the river port of Alberthafen and the trough in the Ostragehege were excavated at the same time. The highest point of the yard, which was kilometre-long, was located at the northwest end and was 17.73 metres above the level of the lowest point under the Waltherstrasse bridge. Shunting engines pulled wagons up the five-track runoff hump, which each wagon would roll off and be directed by points towards a destination track.

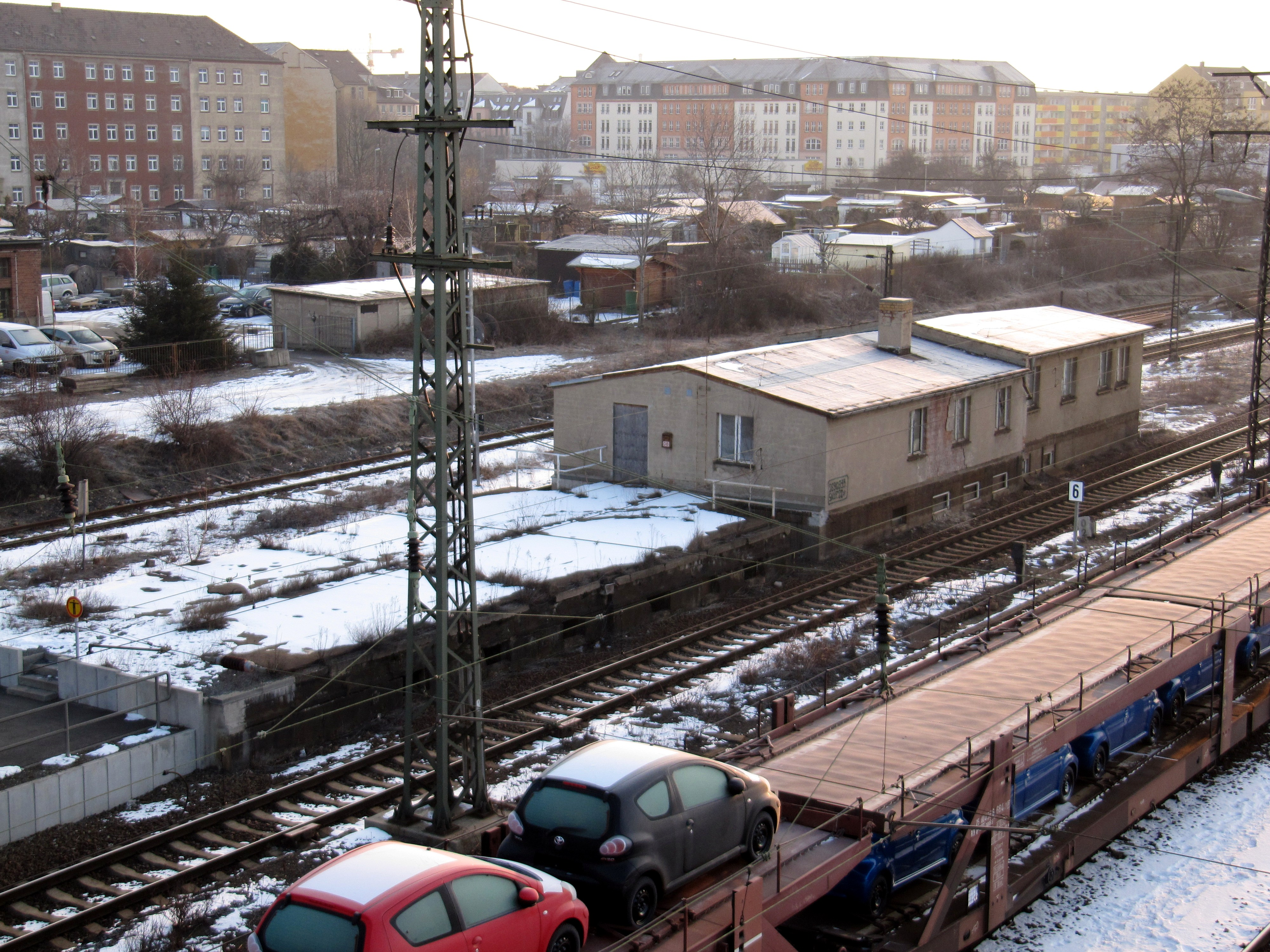
An entrance building was formerly located on the island platform to the east of the Waltherstraße bridge. The basement of the formal part of the building can still be seen in front of the service building.

A new island platform including an entrance building was built for the local passenger traffic some 100 metres to the west of the former passenger station. Passenger trains used the new facilities from 15 October 1892. The station building was not rebuilt after heavy damage in the Second World War, although a service building was built on the basement and foundations of the less formal eastern part. The railway facilities for passenger and freight traffic covered a total of over 54.4 hectares; the length of track at their opening totalled 76.7 kilometres.

Railway workers’ residences on Emerich-Ambros-Ufer (bank), with the canalised Weißeritz on the left

In 1894, the railway administration opened a partially contiguous railway settlement in the immediate vicinity of the station. These included five buildings on the Weißeritz at 54 to 72 Emerich-Ambros-Ufer as well as several houses on Flügelweg. These clinker brick buildings have been preserved to this day. To the south of the marshalling yard, the Saxon State Railways also had a large rail workshop, which opened in November 1894, and a railway depot, which was opened at the same time as the station.

=== Renovation during the 1920s and 1930s ===
Originally two to three brakemen were distributed on the train, who were responsible for the braking of the individual separated wagons. They operated hand spindle brakes or alternatively beam brakes on wagons without spindle brakes. In both cases the operating speed was dependent on the loading condition of the wagon and the condition of the brakes. In addition to this disadvantage, communication problems between the shunter and the brakemen made operations difficult. The curvature of the tracks prevented visual contact and acoustic signals could not reliably overcome wind and noise. In the case of hump operations, the supervisors often interrupted the process too early for safety reasons.

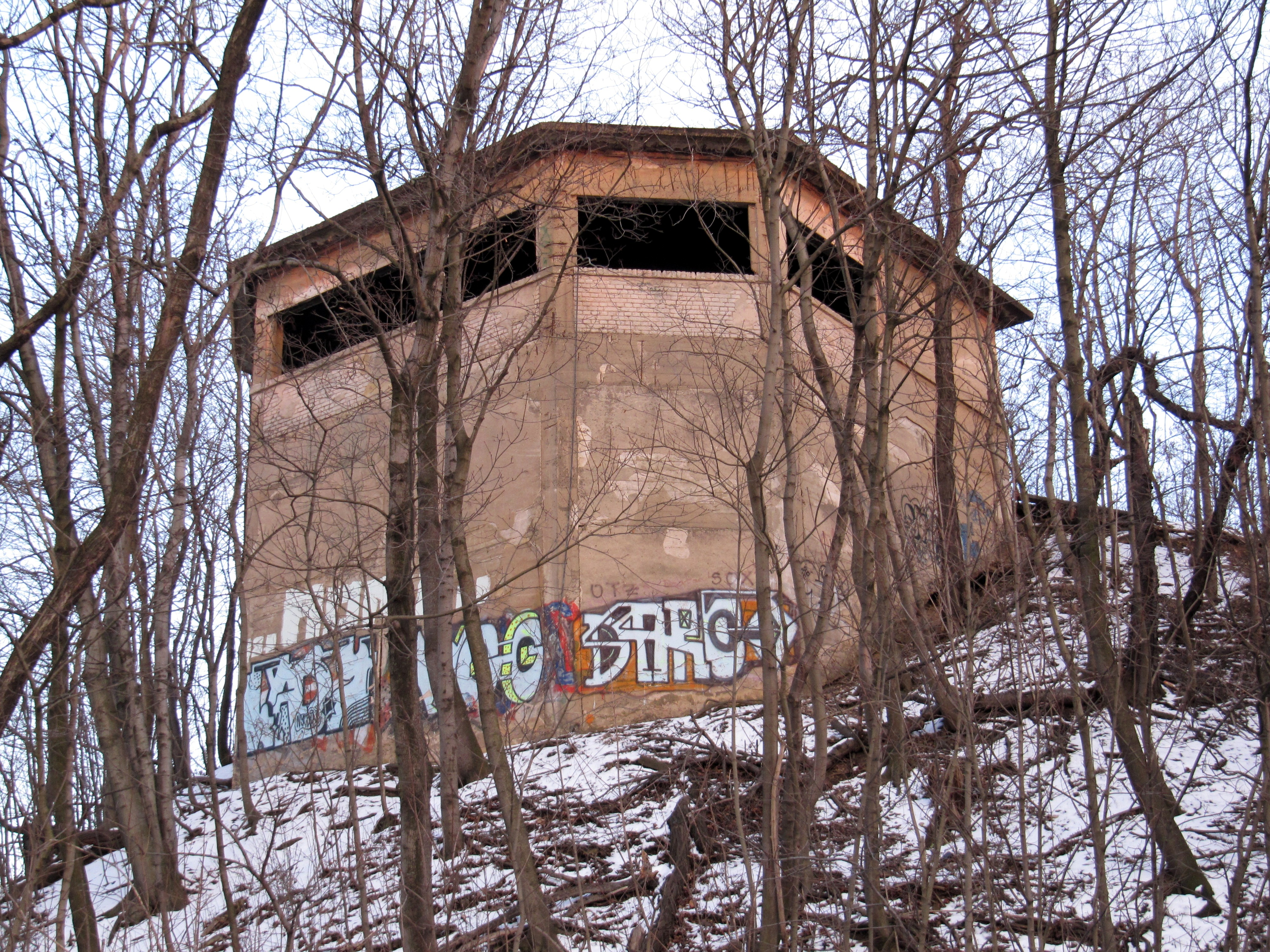
The machine house of the rope shunting system on Hamburger Straße is still standing today.

The engineers dealt with this problem as part of the comprehensive modernisation of the marshalling yard between 1928 and 1935. A rope shunting system for maintaining a controlled flow rate was installed from October 1928. The rope shunting system consisted of one cable wagon each for each of the four cable haulage tracks that ran on narrow gauge tracks laid between the rails (Chemnitz Hilbersdorf marshalling yard based on this system). Two of them were connected together by a cable that ran over a pulley in the drive house on top of the hump. After the wagons were towed up the hump, the locomotive was separated and the wagons were coupled to cable wagons. When each cable wagon ran downhill, the other cable wagon it was connected to by cable was hauled up the hill. The control of the machines hauling the cables in the control building was taken over by the new electro-mechanical signal box 20, so that the flow rate of wagons could be regulated. Built on a bridge above the tracks, it had a good overview of the hump and replaced the former mechanical signal box 20. Subsidiary signal boxes A–G took over control of the main distribution points. In addition Deutsche Reichsbahn built several tracks covered by coarse-grained sand to stop wagons that had got out of control. These tracks still exist today.

The sports grounds of ESV Dresden was opened in February 1934, after several months of construction, in the area of the Reichsbahn locomotive depot on the bank of the Weißeritz (which has been called Emerich-Ambros-Ufer since 1945). At that time it consisted of a shooting range, a bowling alley, a grass field for fistball, a hard court for football and a running track.

=== Destruction in the Second World War ===
Towards the end of the Second World War, the extensive railway infrastructure in Friedrichstadt were repeatedly targeted by bombers of the United States Army Air Forces (USAAF) and the Royal Air Force. As the stations further west of the city were already heavily damaged, Deutsche Reichsbahn routed a large part of the traffic in the Leipzig–Berlin–Dresden area via Dresden-Friedrichstadt from 1944.

On 7 October 1944, 30 bombers of the USAAF attacked Dresden, including Dresden-Friedrichstadt yard, with about 80 tons of explosive bombs as a substitute for their primary target of the hydrogenation plant of Sudetenländische Treibstoffwerke AG (Sutag) at Záluží (Maltheuern) in Litvínov. The USAAF bombed Dresden-Friedrichstadt yard again with 133 aircraft, 279.8 tons of explosive bombs and 41.6 tons of firebombs during the day of 16 January 1945. The districts of Cotta, Löbtau and Leutewitz also suffered damage. This air raid caused 334 deaths. The devastating night air raids of 13 February 1945 were followed by a day air raid on 14 February from 12:17 until 12:27 by 311 B-17 bombers along with five escort fighters of the USAAF. They dropped 1,800 explosive bombs and 136,800 incendiary bombs in bad weather guided by radar. In addition to the main targets, to which the Dresden-Friedrichstadt marshalling yard and the neighbouring locomotive depot as well as several armaments factories belonged, the Friedrichstädt hospital and surrounding quarters were also hit. However, in all the air raids that had been aimed at the station by that time, the Allied air forces were unable to interrupt rail traffic effectively.

Only a renewed targeted air raid on the railway systems of the Saxon capital, which was the last of the eight air raids on Dresden, led to the total failure of Dresden-Friedrichstadt station along with the Hauptbahnhof and other stations. The Eighth Air Force attacked on 17 April 1945 in waves from 13:38 to 15:12 with 572 aircraft and dropped 1,385 tons of explosive bombs as well as 150 tons of incendiary bombs. A burning petrol train and exploding ammunition wagons additionally reinforced the effect of the bombing. A train standing directly at the passenger platform was loaded with Panzerfaust anti-tank weapons, the explosion of which led to the destruction of the entrance building on the island platform.

=== Operations in the post-war period ===
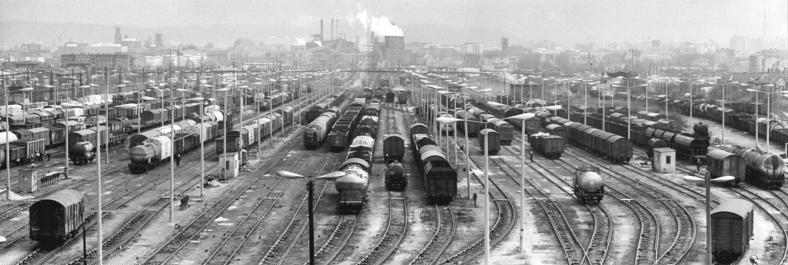
6 January 1984: looking east over the Dresden-Friedrichstadt marshalling yard. In the central background is the central combined heat and power plant in Wilsdruffer Vorstadt and to the left is the Dresden Cathedral. One third of the about 100 trains daily that the railway workers of the largest and most efficient marshalling yard of the GDR assembled were intended for cross-border traffic.

The cable-haulage system had suffered severe damage in the war and was sent to the Soviet Union as reparations; its whereabouts are unknown. Also the hump itself needed repair and the Dresden-Friedrichstadt yard remained largely inoperable for several years. It was provisionally put back into operation on 9 July 1945; it initially had only twelve tracks for entrances and exits and eight marshalling tracks. At the end of 1946, the traffic had returned to about half of the 1938 level and the cable-haulage system was put back into operation on 1 December 1947.

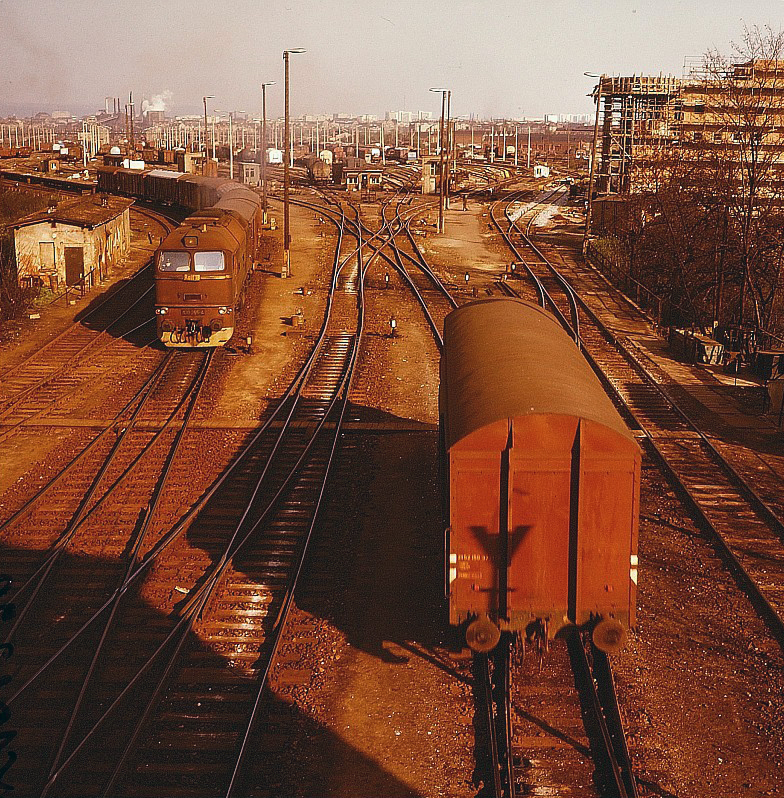
While a single wagon rolls over the hump, a DR class V 200 locomotive pulls the next set of wagons uphill. The new signal box 9 on the right edge of the picture is still under construction. (1981)

The station eventually developed into one of the largest shunting yards in East Germany (GDR). To improve performance, continuous improvement was necessary. In the 1950s, the towing locomotives were equipped with radio. In the following decade, Deutsche Reichsbahn introduced hydraulic beam retarders and commenced electric train operations towards Karl-Marx-Stadt (now Chemnitz); in addition, the use of portable radio telephones began. Point heaters were introduced in 1971 and the building of several additional tracks further increased the yard's capacity, so that up to 5,000 freight wagons per day could be handled. Steam traction in shunting operations ended in 1973/74. Diesel electric locomotives of class V 200 replaced the remaining DR Class 58.30 steam locomotives. The social facilities for the railway employees at this time included, inter alia, an outpatient clinic on Emerich-Ambros-Ufer and a company kindergarten.

One-sided gravity yards were considered efficient for a long time. With the availability of stationary retarders, automatic point setting and modern measuring and control technology, this changed. Therefore, from 1974 until 1976 the former hump was removed and replaced with a new hump with tracks running down on both sides. This allowed a constant exit speed once the wagons had been pushed over the hump.

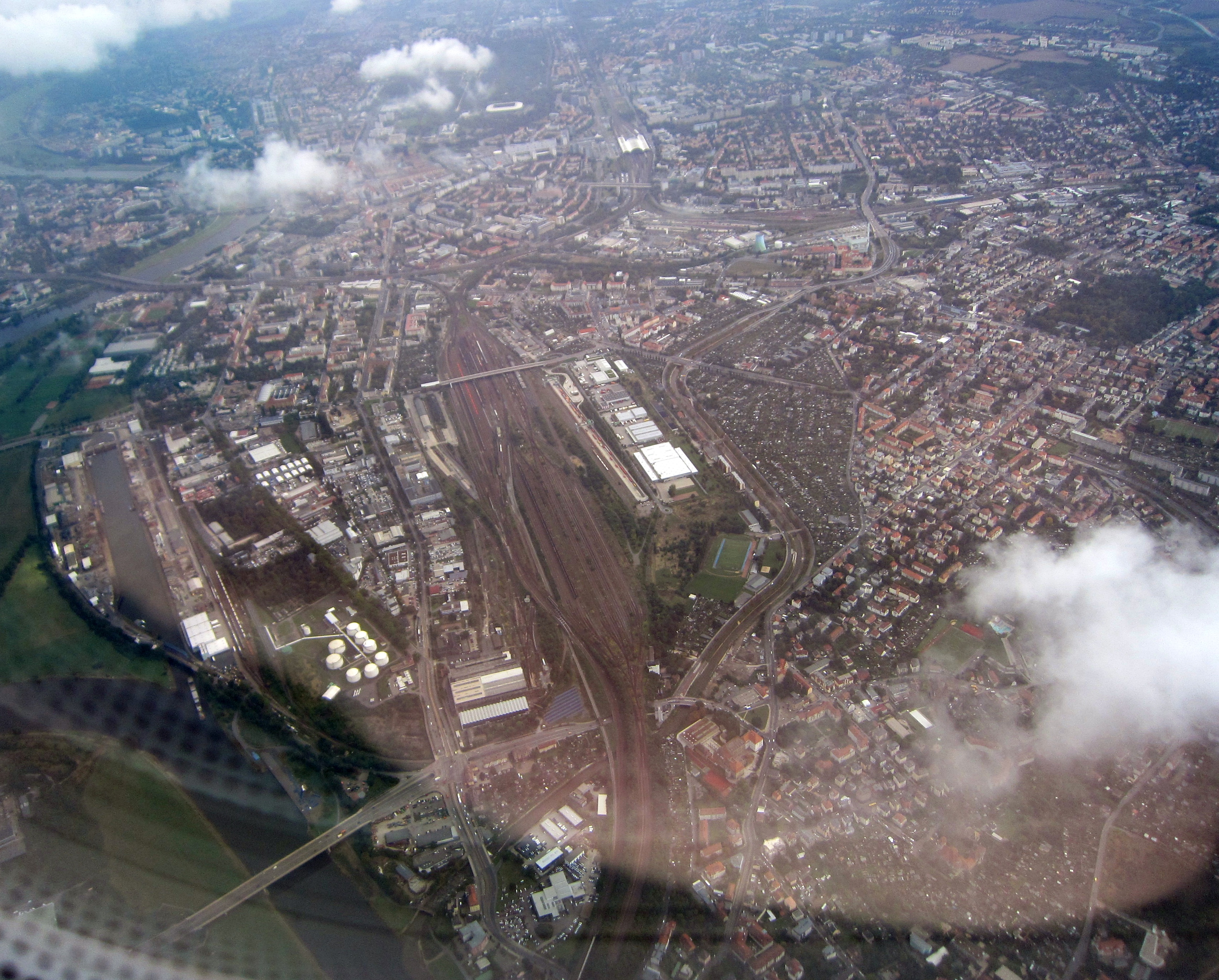
Aerial view

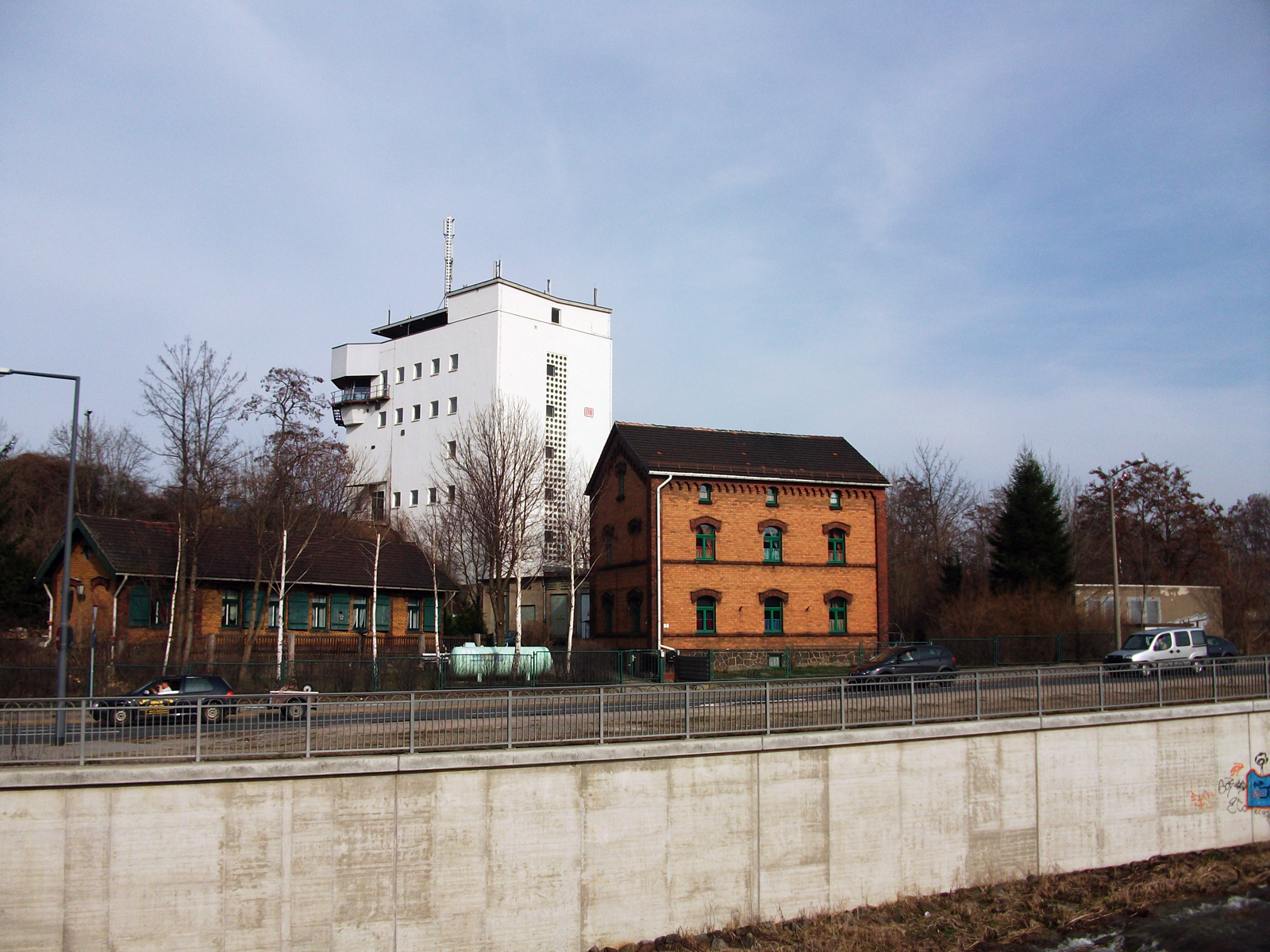
Signalbox 9

Instead of the old signal box 20 at the foot of the hump, signalbox 9 was built on the entrance track in 1981. It received a regulating signal box of GS II A 68 design, which enabled a higher degree of automation.

=== Since German reunification ===
Since German reunification the volume of traffic at Friedrichstadt marshalling yard has been significantly reduced. Freight traffic has shifted more and more to the road. An alternative for cross-border freight transport existed as a rolling highway between 25 September 1994 and 19 June 2004. Ten trains ran daily, each with 23 trucks, from Dresden-Friedrichstadt to Czech Lovosice and back. This measure, which was heavily subsidised by the Free State of Saxony, effectively reduced traffic on federal highway 170. The enlargement of the European Union in May 2004 caused the abandonment of this service as capacity utilisation plummeted. It fell to less than ten percent of capacity at the end.

From March 1998 until the middle of 1999, the site of the repair shop, which had been closed a few years earlier, was cleared for a new freight centre, which was opened just two years later on 9 May 2001. Shortly thereafter, the first companies moved in with two freight forwarders and a Volkswagen logistics centre.

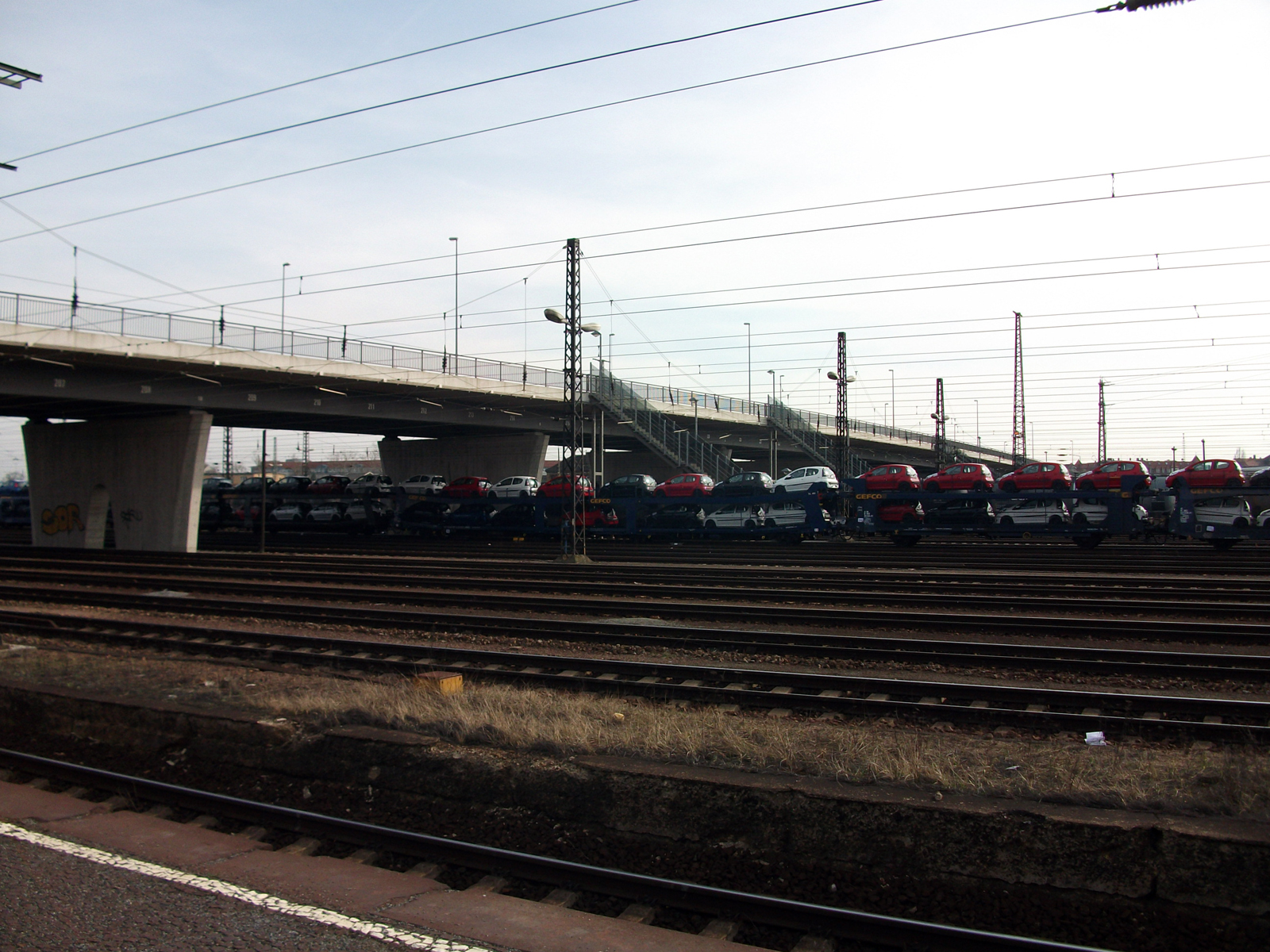
The Waltherstaße bridge crosses the tracks near the passenger station

During the flood in August 2002, the Weißeritz flooded the eastern part of the station, causing great damage to the entire station area. In the autumn of 2003, the dilapidated pedestrian bridge was demolished and then replaced by a new structure. The new bridge also carries road traffic, as did the original bridge, which had to be removed during the electrification of the line. Since public access to the platform is only possible over this bridge, no passenger trains stopped there between 11 August 2003 and 12 December 2004. Using the incremental launch method, the bridge was built as a 300 metres-long continuous beam and installed in eleven launches; it was finally completed at the end of 2004. The construction of the new bridge was very important as Waltherstrasse is part of the only flood-free north–south link in the western part of the city, which continues along Hamburger Straße, the Flügelweg bridge and Washingtonstraße. About €4.5 million of the €17 million total construction cost was funded by Deutsche Bahn.

The new transhipment station in Dresden-Friedrichstadt took over the handling of combined transport in Dresden from the Dresden-Neustadt freight yard on 2 November 2005. It was built within a year for €18.8 million.

Since 1 September 2009, when shunting operations ended, the shunting tracks have only been used to park freight wagons. In addition, a few trains are still broken up in the entrance tracks and formed into local goods trains. In the fourth quarter of 2010, Deutsche Bahn Intended to completely shut down the Dresden-Friedrichstadt marshalling yard in 2011, but the closure was postponed indefinitely in January 2011.

The workshop closed in 2013. In December 2014, it was announced that the station would lose its train formation function and henceforth be operated as a "satellite with shunting". The train formation function is to be relocated initially to Leipzig-Engelsdorf until 2017 and then to the planned freight hub of Halle-Nord.

== Further facilities on the station area ==
=== Reichsbahnausbesserungswerk (Reichsbahn repair shop) Dresden ===
While the marshalling yard was being built, the Saxon State Railways also built a large workshop between 6 September 1890 and November 1894. Its facilities were located between the marshalling yard and the current Emerich-Ambros-Ufer at an angle to the main direction of the tracks. It consisted of a wagon and a locomotive repair workshop. In addition, among other things, a forge, large warehouses and several service, storage and administration buildings were built.

In the first years after commissioning, all standard and narrow-gauge locomotives based in Dresden and the surrounding area, as well as all types of wagons, were repaired. As part of a restructuring of the operations, the Reichsbahn gave responsibility to Chemnitz for narrow gauge repairs in 1931 and for locomotive repairs in 1938.

After the political changes in eastern Germany in 1989–90, freight traffic declined sharply and demand for freight wagons dropped significantly. The vehicle maintenance therefore ran down in the early 1990s and the repair shop was demolished in the late 1990s in favour of the planned freight transport centre.

=== Bahnbetriebswerk (locomotive depot) Dresden ===
At the same time as the construction of the marshalling yard, the Bahnbetriebswerk Dresden-Friedrichstadt was built south of the railway tracks at the eastern end of the line; until 1928 this was known as the Heizhausanlage Peterstraße (Peterstraße boiler house precinct). It was located between Behringstraße (until 1946: Peterstraße) and the Waltherstraße bridge, with Fröbelstraße bordering the depot to the south. The boiler house consisted of three roundhouses with coal-loading facilities, each with 20 locomotive stalls, an administrative and despatch building, a coal shed and a few smaller buildings. On 1 May 1894, after more than three years of construction, the depot was the base of freight locomotives only and thus formed the counterpart of the Heizhausanlage Dresden-Altstadt.

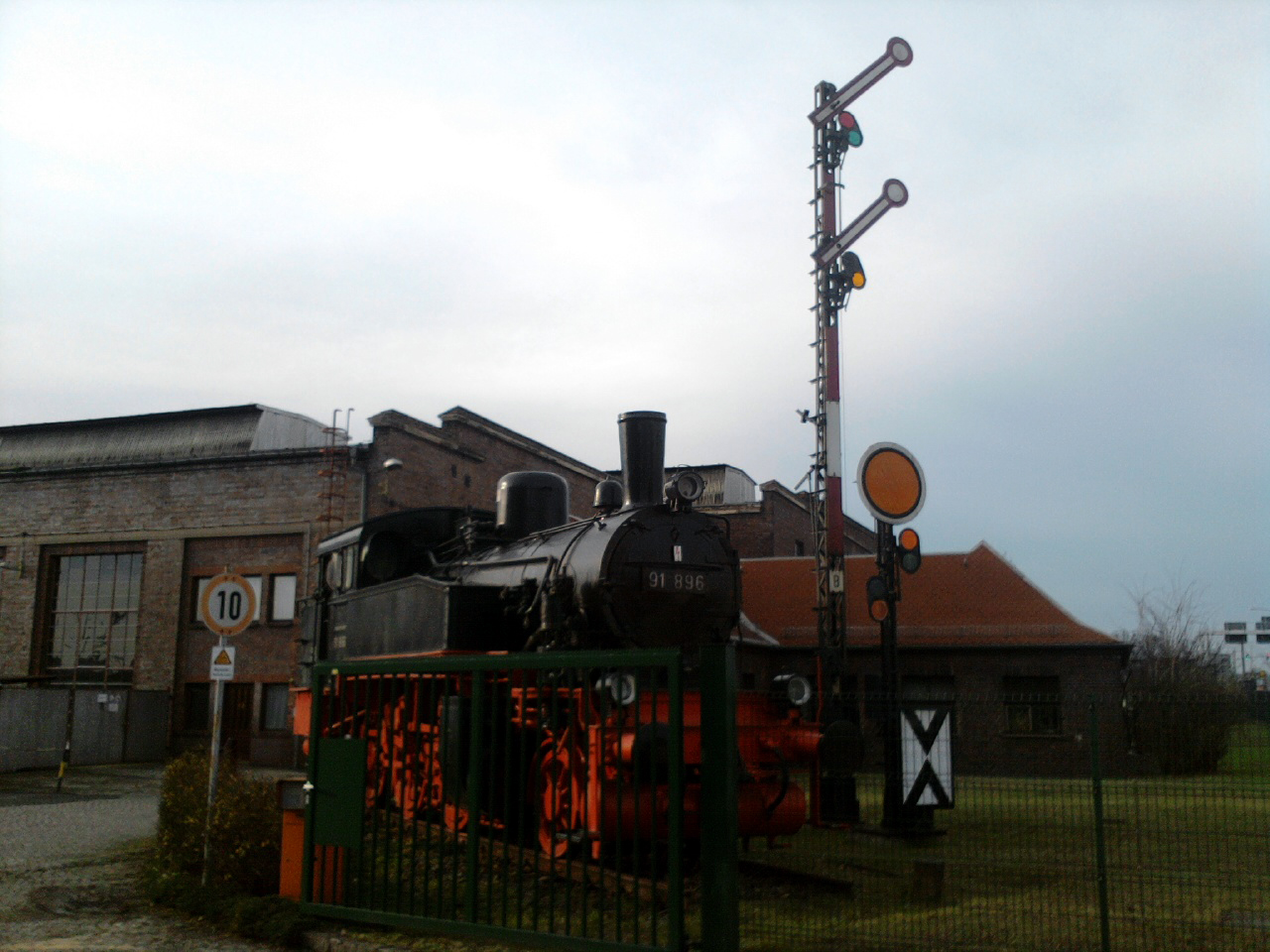
The retired steam locomotive 91 896 decorated the entrance to the railway depot on Hamburger Straße from 1985 to 2009.

Since the facilities on the former Peterstraße could not be expand, a new railway depot was established in 1935 on the opposite, northern side of the marshalling yard on Hamburger Straße. The new locomotive workshop was inaugurated there in 1940. The original buildings preserved from this period, include among other things, a large work shop, the administrative building and several outbuildings.

On 1 January 1967, the locomotive depots of Dresden-Pieschen, Dresden-Altstadt and Dresden-Friedrichstadt were merged with the Dresden locomotive depot. The only remaining steam locomotive works still operating were concentrated in the Zwickauer Straße section of the former Dresden-Altstadt locomotive depot. Since then the rest of the operations of the locomotive depot operations have been concentrated in Dresden-Friedrichstadt.
