= DKE =

DKE may refer to:

- DKE Records, a record label associated with Hall & Oates
- Data & Knowledge Engineering, an academic journal
- Delta Kappa Epsilon, an American student organization
- German Commission for Electrotechnical, Electronic & Information Technologies of DIN and VDE, a German standards organization
- The Dunning–Kruger effect, a form of cognitive bias which causes people with limited competence to overrate their understanding and abilities.
- Dresden-Kemnitz station (DS100 code), a railway station in Dresden, Germany
- Deutscher Kleinempfänger, a brand of early Volksempfänger, a type of radio
- Department of Data Science and Knowledge Engineering, at Maastricht University, Netherlands
- Dihakho Station (station code), a railway station in Assam, India
- Jubilee Airways (ICAO code), a British airline
