= Dresden-Cotta railway station =

Railway station in Dresden, Germany

Dresden-Cotta
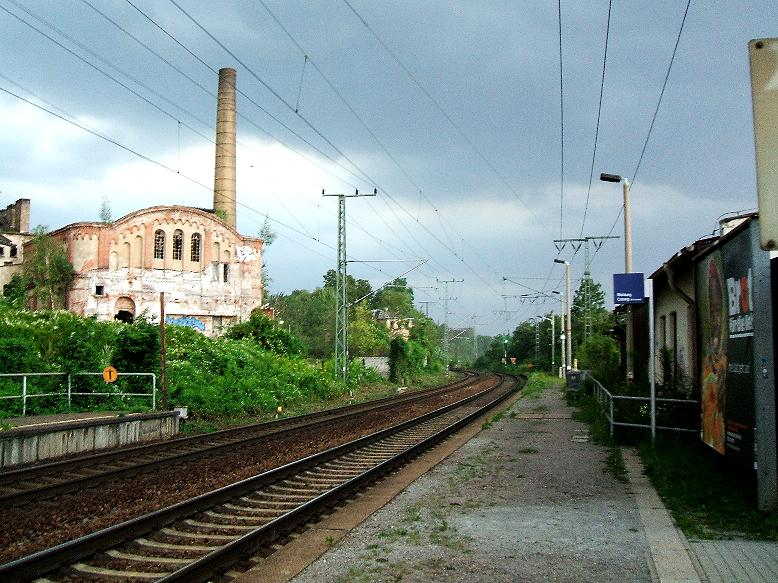
- Dresden-Cotta railway station

General information
- Location: Dresden, Saxony; Germany
- Coordinates: 51.0344°N 13.4059°E
- System: Hp
- Owner: DB Netz
- Operator: DB Station&Service
- Line: Berlin–Dresden railway
- Platforms: 2 side platforms
- Tracks: 2
- Train operators: DB Regio Südost

Other information
- Station code: 1346
- DS100 code: DCT
- Category: 6
- Website: www.bahnhof.de

Services
Preceding station	DB Regio Nordost	Following station
Dresden-Friedrichstadt towards Dresden Hbf	RB 31	Dresden-Kemnitz towards Elsterwerda-Biehla
Location
- Location within Saxony

Dresden-Cotta (German: Haltepunkt Dresden-Cotta) is a railway station located in Dresden, Germany. The station is located on the Berlin–Dresden railway. The train services are operated by Deutsche Bahn.

== Train services ==
The following services currently call at the station:

- Local services RB 31 Elsterwerda-Biehla - Großenhain - Coswig - Cossebaude - Dresden

== See also ==
- Cotta (Dresden)
