= Cossebaude station =

Railway station in Dresden, Germany

Cossebaude
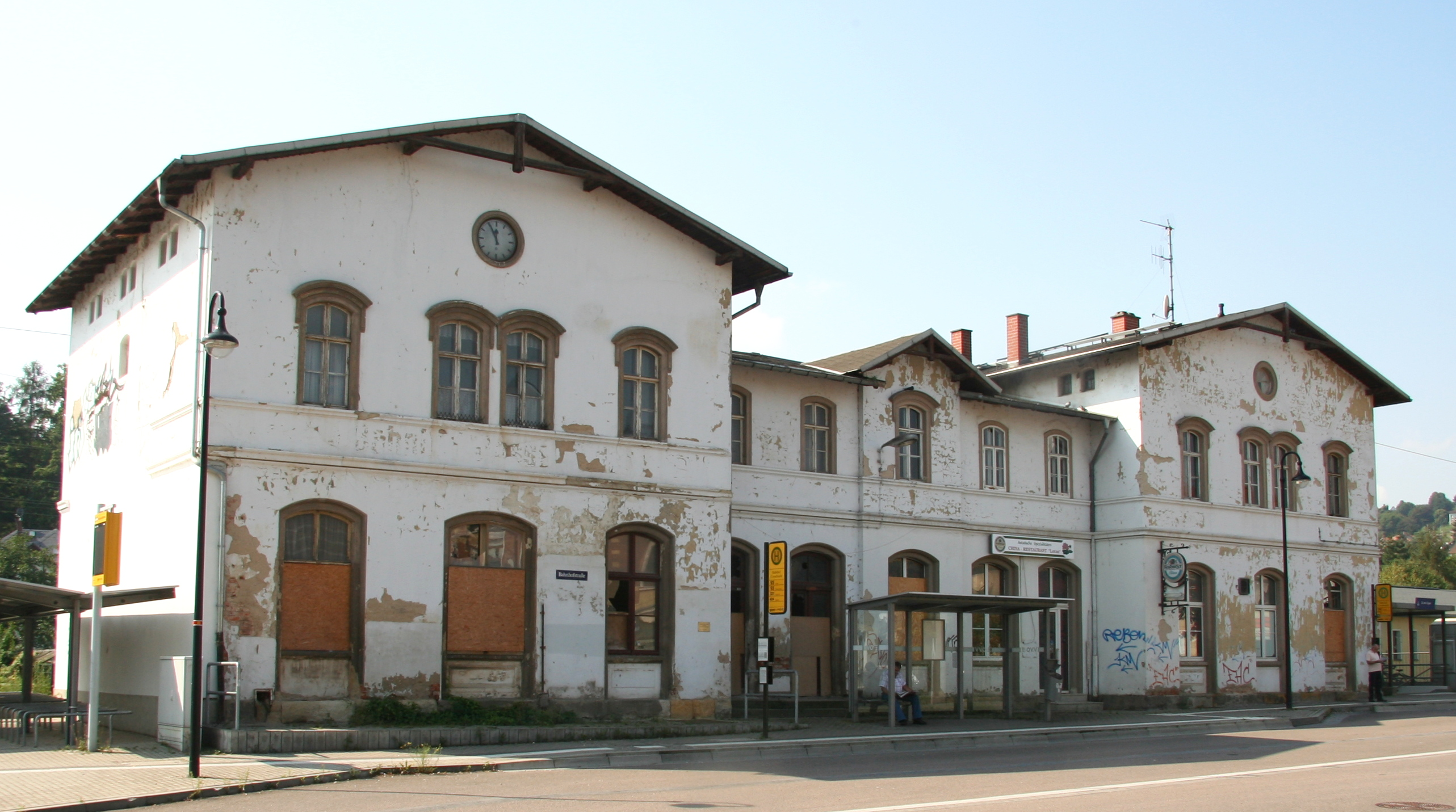
- 2012

General information
- Location: Bahnhofstraße 8; 01156 Dresden; Saxony; Germany
- Coordinates: 51.085325°N 13.631645°E
- System: Bf
- Owner: DB Netz
- Operator: DB Station&Service
- Lines: Berlin–Dresden railway (KBS 225)
- Platforms: 1 island platform
- Tracks: 4
- Train operators: DB Regio Südost

Other information
- Station code: 1073
- DS100 code: DCB
- IBNR: 8011320
- Category: 6
- Fare zone: VVO
- Website: www.bahnhof.de

Services
Preceding station	DB Regio Nordost	Following station
Dresden-Stetzsch towards Dresden Hbf	RB 31	Niederwartha towards Elsterwerda-Biehla
Location
- Location within Saxony

Cossebaude station is a railway station in the Cossebaude district in the capital city of Dresden, Saxony, Germany.
