= Bad Liebenwerda station =

Railway station in Germany

Bad Liebenwerda
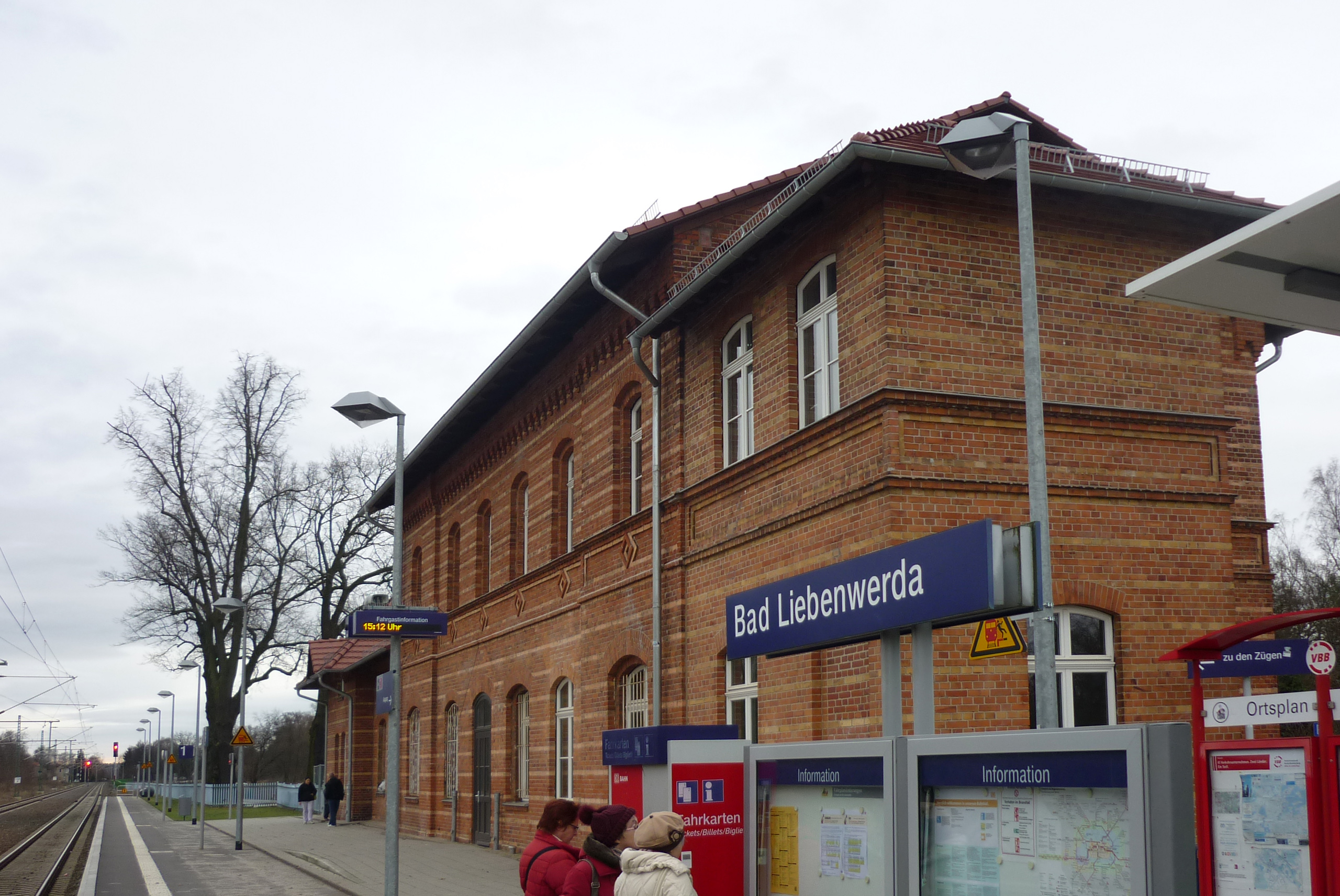

General information
- Location: Ladestraße; 04924 Bad Liebenwerda; Brandenburg; Germany
- Coordinates: 51°31′06″N 13°24′13″E
- Owner: DB Netz
- Operator: DB Station&Service
- Line: Węgliniec–Roßlau railway
- Platforms: 1 side platform
- Tracks: 2
- Train operators: DB Regio Nordost

Construction
- Accessible: Yes

Other information
- Station code: 303
- DS100 code: BBLW
- IBNR: 8011078
- Category: 7
- Fare zone: : 7856
- Website: www.bahnhof.de

Services
Preceding station	DB Regio Nordost	Following station
Falkenberg (Elster) towards Leipzig Hbf	RE 11	Elsterwerda-Biehla towards Hoyerswerda
Falkenberg (Elster) Terminus	RB 49	Elsterwerda-Biehla towards Cottbus Hbf
Location

Bad Liebenwerda station is a railway station in the spa town of Bad Liebenwerda, located in the Elbe-Elster district in Brandenburg, Germany.
