= Dresden-Kemnitz station =

Railway station in Dresden, Germany

Dresden-Kemnitz
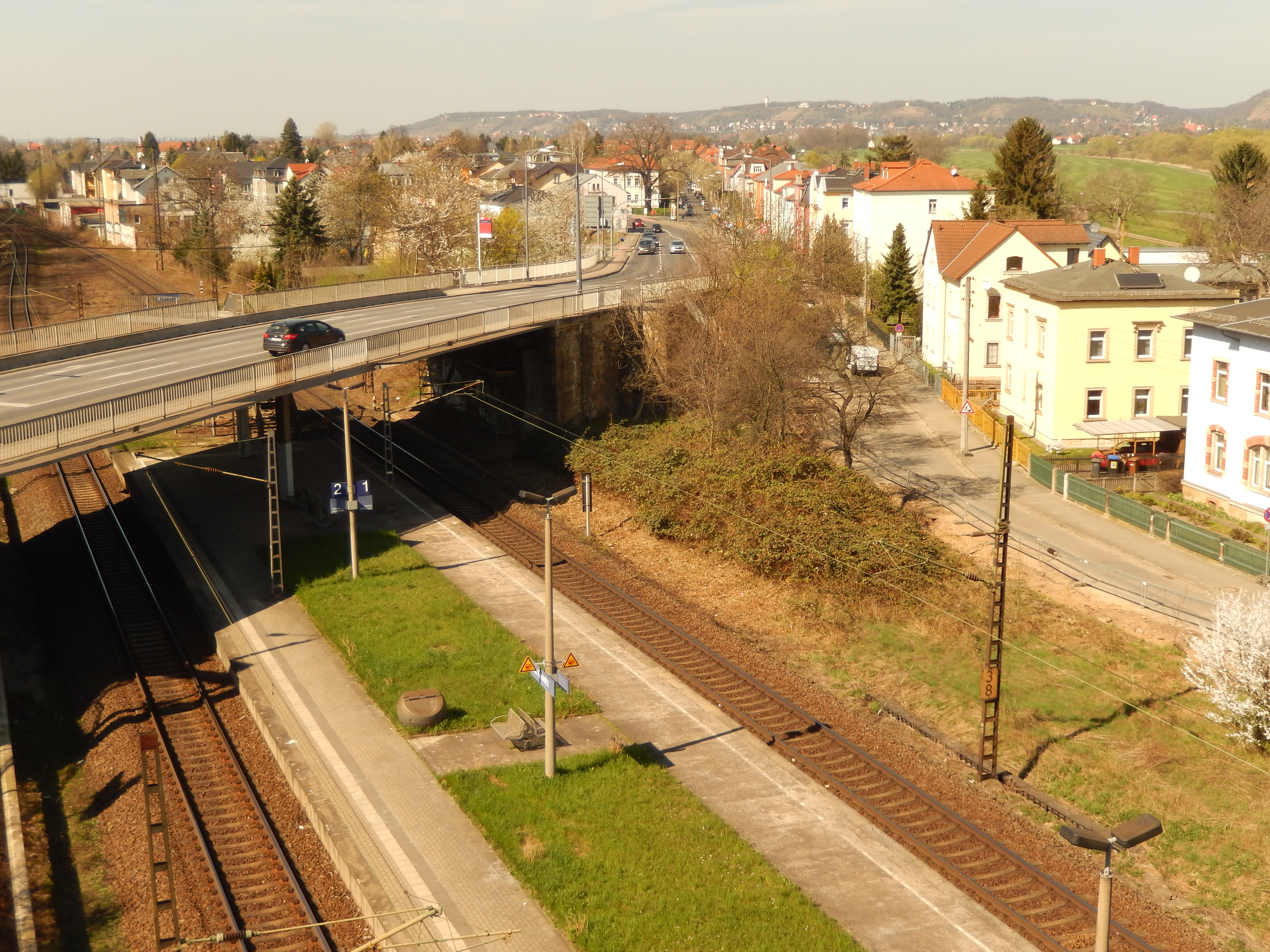
- 2017

General information
- Location: Meißner Landstraße; 01157 Dresden; Saxony; Germany
- Elevation: 108 m (354 ft)
- System: Hp
- Owner: DB Netz
- Operator: DB Station&Service
- Lines: Berlin–Dresden railway (KBS 225)
- Platforms: 1 island platform
- Tracks: 2
- Train operators: DB Regio Südost

Other information
- Station code: 1350
- DS100 code: DKE
- IBNR: 8011421
- Category: 6
- Fare zone: VVO
- Website: www.bahnhof.de

Services
Preceding station	DB Regio Nordost	Following station
Dresden-Cotta towards Dresden Hbf	RB 31	Dresden-Stetzsch towards Elsterwerda-Biehla
Location
- Location within Saxony

Dresden-Kemnitz station is a railway station in the Kemnitz district in the capital city of Dresden, Saxony, Germany.
