= Plessa station =

Railway station in Germany

Plessa
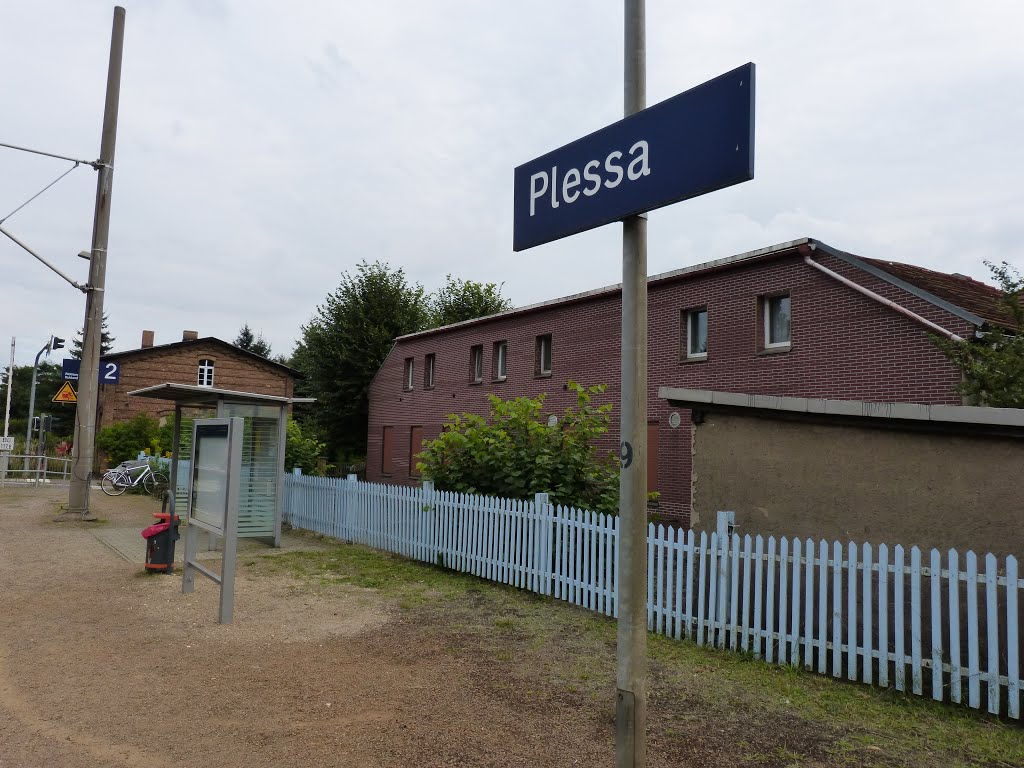

General information
- Location: Bahnhofstraße; 04928 Plessa; Brandenburg; Germany
- Coordinates: 51°28′15″N 13°37′01″E
- Owner: Deutsche Bahn
- Operator: DB Netz; DB Station&Service
- Line: Węgliniec–Roßlau railway
- Platforms: 2 side platforms
- Tracks: 2
- Train operators: DB Regio Nordost

Other information
- Station code: 4963
- DS100 code: BP
- IBNR: 8012650
- Category: 6
- Fare zone: : 7959
- Website: www.bahnhof.de

Services
Preceding station	DB Regio Nordost	Following station
Elsterwerda-Biehla towards Leipzig Hbf	RE 11	Lauchhammer towards Hoyerswerda
Elsterwerda-Biehla towards Elsterwerda	RE 13	Lauchhammer towards Cottbus Hbf
Elsterwerda-Biehla towards Falkenberg (Elster)	RB 49	Lauchhammer towards Cottbus Hbf
Location
- Location within Brandenburg Location within Germany Location within Europe

Plessa station is a railway station in the municipality of Plessa, located in the Elbe-Elster district in Brandenburg, Germany.
