= Elsterwerda-Biehla station =

Railway station in Elsterwerda, Germany

Elsterwerda-Biehla
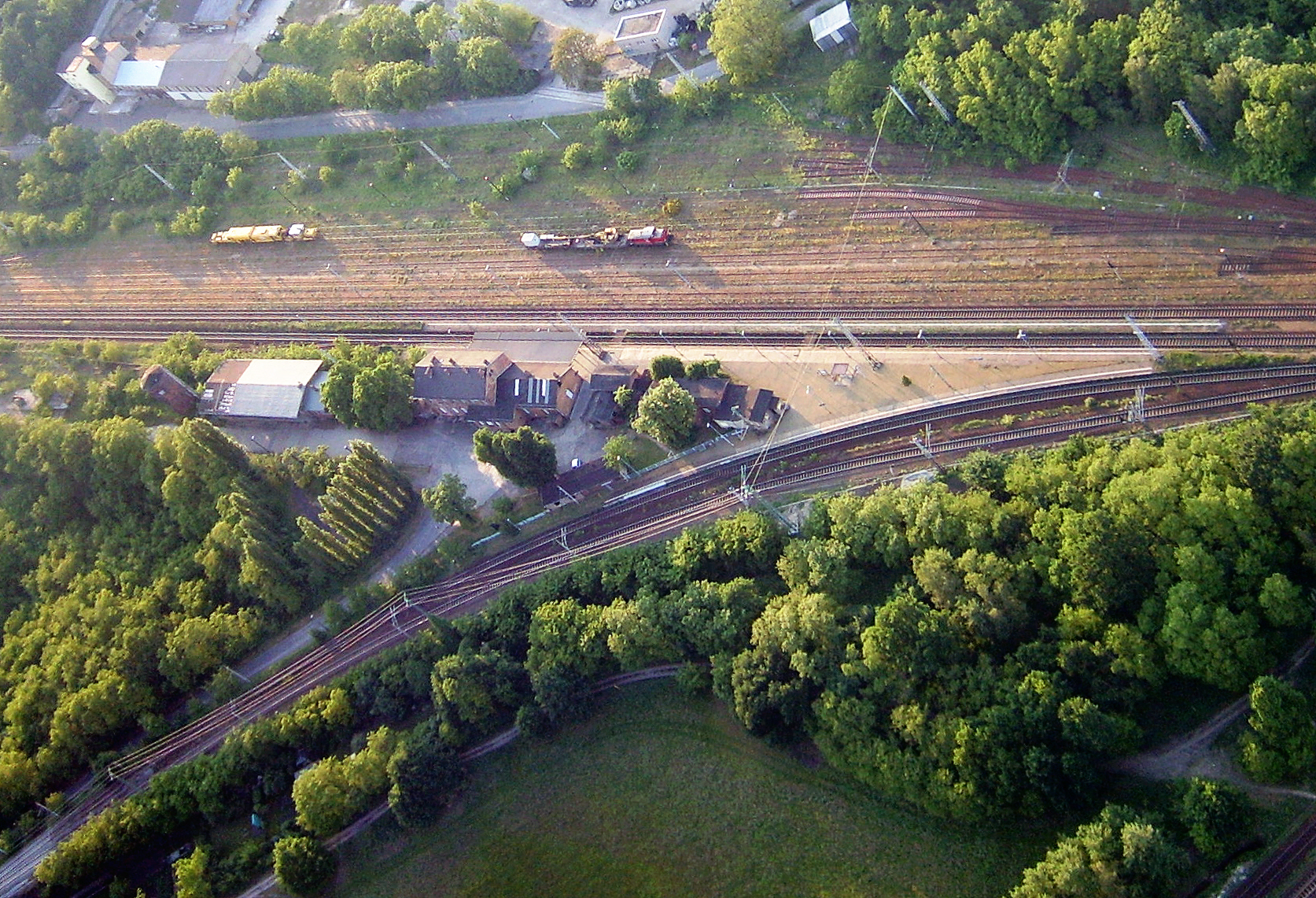

General information
- Location: Am Nordbahnhof; 04910 Elsterwerda; Brandenburg; Germany
- Coordinates: 51.4722°N 13.5185°E
- System: Keilbahnhof
- Owner: Deutsche Bahn
- Operator: DB Netz; DB Station&Service
- Line: Węgliniec–Roßlau railway
- Platforms: 3 side platforms
- Tracks: 3
- Train operators: DB Regio Nordost

Other information
- Station code: 1570
- DS100 code: BEB
- IBNR: 8010100
- Category: 6
- Fare zone: : 7858
- Website: www.bahnhof.de

History
- Opened: 1 June 1874; 152 years ago

Services
| Preceding station | DB Regio Nordost | Following station |
|---|---|---|
| Bad Liebenwerda towards Leipzig Hbf | RE 11 | Plessa towards Hoyerswerda |
| Elsterwerda Terminus | RE 13 | Plessa towards Cottbus Hbf |
| Elsterwerda towards Dresden Hbf | RB 31 | Terminus |
| Bad Liebenwerda towards Falkenberg (Elster) | RB 49 | Plessa towards Cottbus Hbf |
Location

Elsterwerda-Biehla station is a railway station in the Biehla district of the town of Elsterwerda, located in the Elbe-Elster district in Brandenburg, Germany.
